= Diver communications =

Methods used by underwater divers to communicate

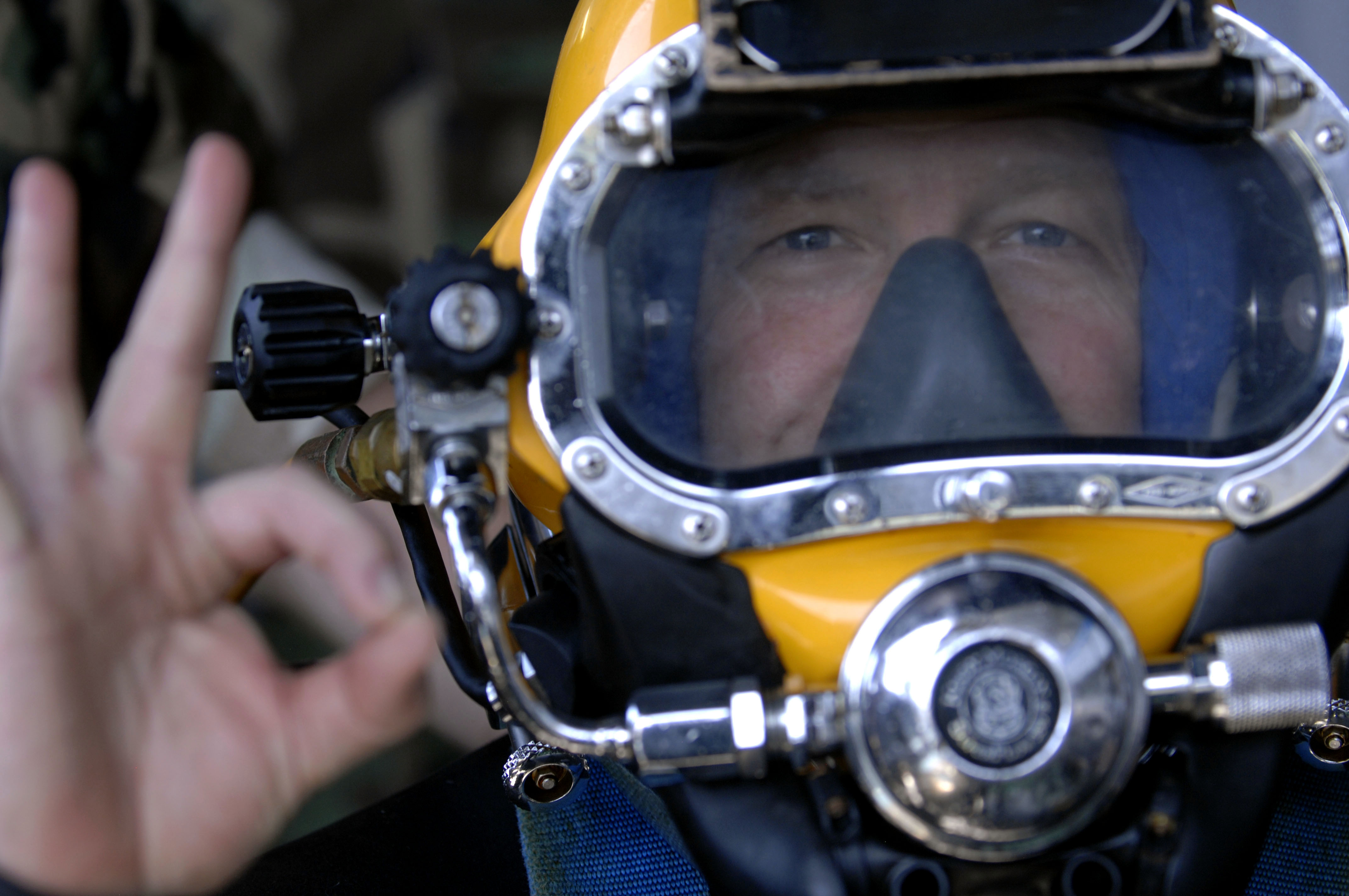
The hand signal "OK"

Diver communications are the methods used by divers to communicate with each other or with surface members of the dive team. In professional diving, diver communication is usually between a single working diver and the diving supervisor at the surface control point. This is considered important both for managing the diving work, and as a safety measure for monitoring the condition of the diver. The traditional method of communication was by line signals, but this has been superseded by voice communication, and line signals are now used in emergencies when voice communications have failed. Surface supplied divers often carry a closed circuit video camera on the helmet which allows the surface team to see what the diver is doing and to be involved in inspection tasks. This can also be used to transmit hand signals to the surface if voice communications fails. Underwater slates may be used to write text messages which can be shown to other divers, and there are some dive computers which allow a limited number of pre-programmed text messages to be sent through-water to other divers or surface personnel with compatible equipment.

Communication between divers and between surface personnel and divers is imperfect at best, and non-existent at worst, as a consequence of the physical characteristics of water. This prevents divers from performing at their full potential. Voice communication is the most generally useful format underwater, as visual forms are more affected by visibility, and written communication and signing are relatively slow and restricted by diving equipment.

Recreational divers do not usually have access to voice communication equipment, and it does not generally work with a standard scuba demand valve mouthpiece, so they use other signals. Hand signals are generally used when visibility allows, and there are a range of commonly used signals, with some variations. These signals are often also used by professional divers to communicate with other divers. There is also a range of other special purpose non-verbal signals, mostly used for safety and emergency communications.

== Function ==
For safety and efficiency, divers may need to communicate with others diving with them, or with their surface support team. The interface between air and water is an effective barrier to direct sound transmission, and the natural water surface is also a barrier to visual communication across the interface due to internal reflection, particularly when not perfectly smooth. The equipment used by divers and the pressurised environment are also hindrances to sound-based communication, and the encumbrance of diving equipment, relatively low light levels, and low visibility of many diving environments also hinders visual communication.

Communication is most critical in an emergency, where high stress levels make effective communication more difficult, and the circumstances of the emergency may make the communication physically more difficult. Voice communication is natural and effective where it is practicable, and most people rely on it for fast and accurate communication in most circumstances.

The general requirements for an effective system for diver communication are that all the people who will use it have access to the system, that it functions effectively in the specific environment, that the people who wish to use it are familiar enough with it to communicate quickly, accurately and unambiguously with each other, and that the system has sufficient range to work when needed. A simple, logical and widely standardised system of signals is more effective at meeting these requirements. Several such systems have been developed using different equipment and suited for different circumstances. These include sound-based systems, visual systems and tactile systems.

== History ==
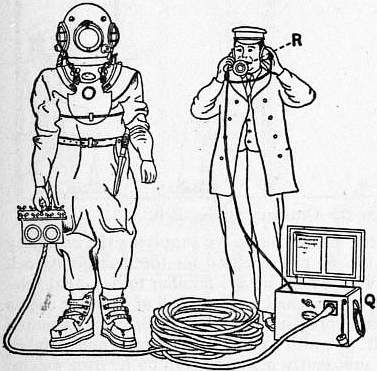
Diver telephone c.1911

The original communication between diver and surface attendant was by pulls on the diver's lifeline. Later, a speaking tube system, patented by Louis Denayrouze in 1874, was tried; this used a second hose with a diaphragm sealing each end to transmit sound, but it was not very successful. A small number were made by Siebe-Gorman, but the telephone system was introduced soon after this and since it worked better and was safer, the speaking tube was soon obsolete, and most helmets which had them were returned to the factory and converted. In the early 20th century electrical telephone systems were developed which improved the quality of voice communication. These used wires incorporated into the lifeline or air line, and used either headsets worn inside the helmet or speakers mounted inside the helmet. The microphone could be mounted in the front of the helmet or a contact throat-microphone could be used. At first it was only possible for the diver to talk to the surface telephonist, but later double telephone systems were introduced which allowed two-divers to speak directly to each other, while being monitored by the attendant. Diver telephones were manufactured by Siebe-Gorman, Heinke, Rene Piel, Morse, Eriksson, and Draeger among others. This system was well-established by the mid-20th century, has been improved several times as new technology became available, and is still in common use for surface-supplied divers using lightweight demand helmets and full-face masks. The introduction of closed circuit video to monitor the interior of diving bells, and to provide the supervisory team with direct feedback on the diver's work activities has expanded the capacity to provide useful advice to the working diver, and to keep track of the stand-by diver or bellman's activity in an emergency, making coordinated activity easier and more effective.

More recently, through-water systems have been developed which do not use wires to transmit the signal. They were first developed for the U.S. Navy in the late 1960s. An early system for recreational scuba, the Wet Phone, was launched by Sound Wave Systems in 1977, but failed. By the mid-1980s miniaturized electronics made it possible to use single-sideband modulation, which greatly improved intelligibility in good conditions. By 1988 several systems using single side-band were found satisfactory by the US Navy for intelligibility and range, and mostly satisfactory for ergonomics, reliability and maintainability. Through-water systems allow communications over limited distances between divers and with the surface, usually using a push to talk system, which minimises power consumption by transmitting only on demand. They are not yet in general use by recreational divers due to cost and the need for a full-face mask.

== Scope ==
Surface supplied diving uses the widest range of equipment and methods. As of 2021, hard wired (cable) voice communications are still the primary method, supported in major commercial applications by one-way closed circuit video but line pull signals are also used as an emergency backup, and through-water voice systems may be used as emergency backup for closed diving bells. Local communication between divers includes hand signals and text written on slates.

Scuba diving can be done with cable voice communications, but the restriction on mobility makes this an unusual choice as it negates the primary reason for using scuba. Through-water voice communications do not have the same restriction on diver mobility, which is often the reason for choosing scuba for professional diving, but are more complex, more expensive, and less reliable than the hard-wired systems. There are some recreational applications for through-water voice communications for scuba, but this method is usually used for professional applications such as military and scientific diving, and almost all recreational diving relies on hand signals, light signals and writing slates for diver-to-diver communications, with the very few communications between diver and surface restricted to pre-arranged emergency signals. Breath-hold divers use a subset of the recreational diving hand signals where applicable, and have some additional hand-signals specific to freediving.

The presence of divers in the water during a diving operation exposes the divers to risks from passing waterborne traffic, and there are internationally standardised shape, light and flag signals to indicate that the diving support vessel is restricted in its ability to maneuver and that there are divers in the water.

== Voice communications ==
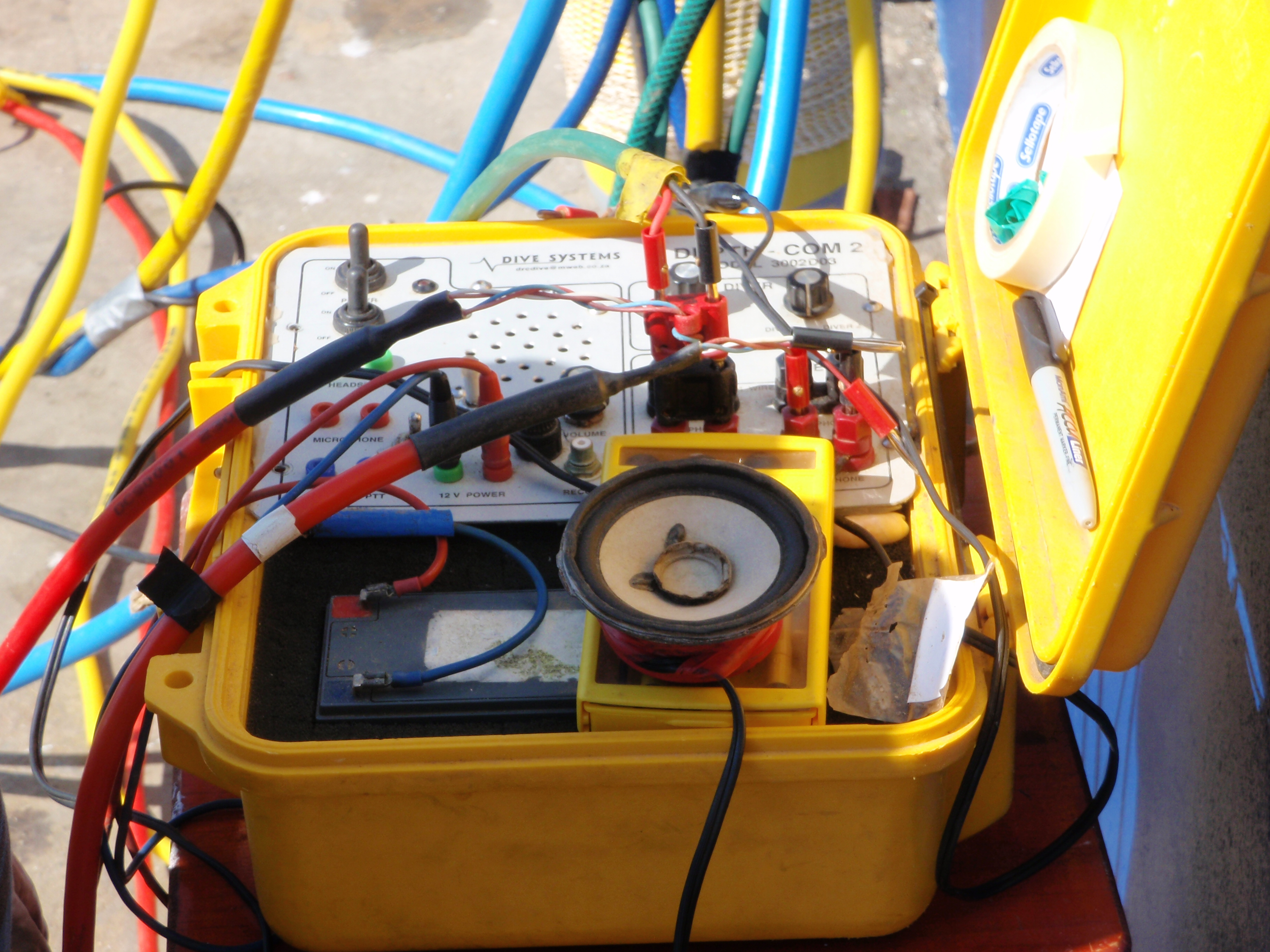
A hard-wired diver communications unit mounted in a waterproof box for convenience of transport and protection. The loose speaker has been added to increase output volume. There is a built in speaker behind the perforations on the panel.

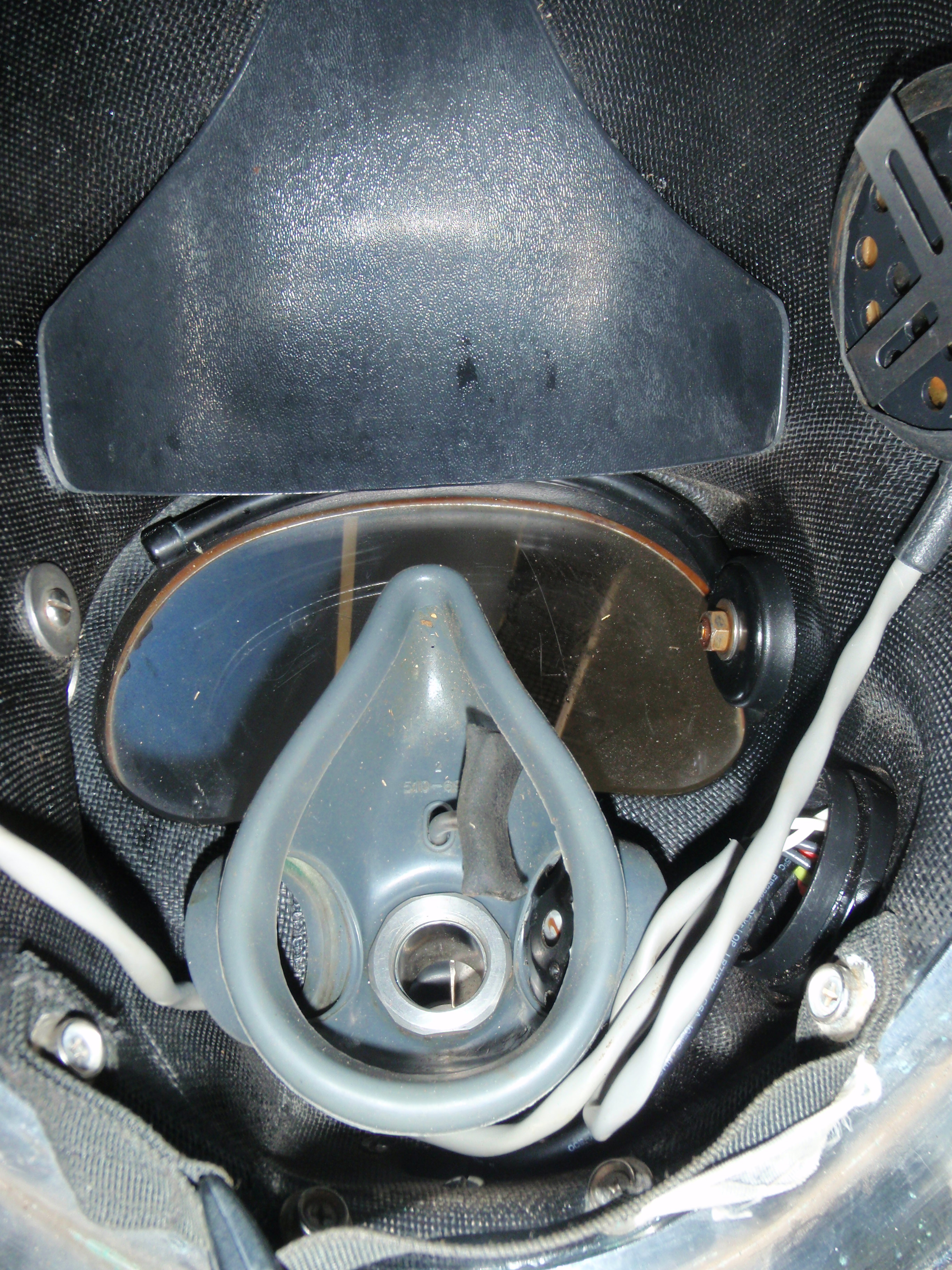
Inside a Kirby Morgan 37 helmet showing the microphone in the oro-nasal mask, and one of the speakers at the top of the photo.

=== Equipment ===
Both hard-wired (cable) and through-water electronic voice communications systems may be used with surface supplied diving. Wired systems are more popular as there is a physical connection to the diver for gas supply in any case, and adding a cable does not make the system any different to handle. Wired communications systems are still more reliable and simpler to maintain than through-water systems, and do not require the diver to carry a power source. The communications equipment is relatively straightforward and may be of the two-wire or four-wire type. Two wire systems use the same wires for surface to diver and diver to surface messages, whereas four wire systems allow the diver's messages and the surface operator's messages to use separate wire pairs, allowing simultaneous speech in both directions. A standard arrangement with wired diver communications is to have the diver's side normally on, so that the surface team can hear anything from the diver at all times except when the surface is sending a message on a two-wire system. This is considered an important safety feature, as the surface team can monitor the diver's breathing sounds, which can give early warning of problems developing, and confirms that the diver is alive.

Through-water communications systems are more suitable for scuba as the diver is not encumbered by a communications cable, but they can be fitted to surface supplied equipment if desired. Most through-water systems have a push to talk system, so that high power is only used to transmit the signal when the diver has something to say. For commercial diving applications this is a disadvantage, in that the supervisor cannot monitor the condition of the divers by hearing them breathe.

Through-water communication systems are of two basic types. Acoustic systems provide one-way communications from the surface to divers. An audio signal emitted by a submerged transducer travels through the water to the divers, who can hear the sound directly, without signal receiving equipment. Amplitude modulated (AM) and single sideband (SSB) systems provide two-way communications between divers and between the surface and divers. Both the AM and SSB systems require electronic transmitting and receiving equipment worn by the divers, and an immersed transducer connected to the surface unit. SSB systems perform better around obstacles, and AM systems give a stronger and often clearer signal for the same power, but are restricted to line-of-sight use.

The diver's speech is picked up by the microphone and converted into a high frequency sound signal transmitted to the water by the omnidirectional transducer. The signal can bounce off the bottom and surface and other obstructions, which can extend the range around obstructions, but will also degrade the signal due to interference effects caused by varying path lengths of different routes. When a receiving transducer picks up the signal, the ultrasonic signal is converted to an amplitude modulated electrical signal, amplified and converted to sound by the earphone. The through-water communications sets carried by the divers are battery powered.

The push-to-talk (PTT) method is the most widely available system for through-water communications, but some equipment allows continuous transmission, or voice activated mode (VOX).

Push-to-talk is simple, efficient, and the preferred mode of many divers. It transmits only when the button is pressed, and saves power by not transmitting when the diver has nothing to say, but requires the diver to use a hand to transmit. Users take turns to speak and listen. This is normal communications protocol, and encourages clear communication, but does not allow audio monitoring of the diver between communications.

Voice activated means that the unit is intended to transmit when the diver's voice activates the microphone. If there is sufficient sound level generated at the microphone, the unit will transmit. This would run the battery down more rapidly when the background noise level is sufficient to activate transmission, but it allows hands-free communications.

Continuous transmission is a mode where one diver transmits continuously. This is hands free, but all audible noise will be heard by others on the same channel and within range. Open circuit breathing apparatus generally produces considerable exhalation bubble noise.

Through-water systems are also used for back-up to the wired communications via the umbilical generally used in closed diving bells. These systems are used in case of failure of the wired system, and do not rely on the integrity of the bell umbilical, so will work if the umbilical is severed and the bell lost. They operate between a battery powered transducer on the bell and a surface unit using a similar acoustic signal to those used for wireless diver communications. Single side-band suppressed carrier systems may be used, and a 27 kHz frequency with 4.2 kHz bandwidth is typical. Divers breathing helium may need a decoder system (also called unscrambling), which reduces the frequency of the sound to make it more intelligible.

=== Voice communication protocol ===
Underwater voice communication protocol is like radiotelephony procedure. The parties take turns to speak, use clear, short sentences, and indicate when they have finished, and whether a response is expected. Like radio, this is done to ensure that the message has a fair chance of being understood, and the speaker is not interrupted. When more than one recipient is possible, the caller will also identify the desired recipient by a call up message, and will also usually identify themselves. The surface caller should also give the diver a chance to temporarily suspend or slow down breathing, or stop using noisy equipment, as breathing noise generated by gas flow through the inlet and bubble noise from the exhaust is often so loud that the message can not be heard over it.

=== Hyperbaric speech distortion ===
The process of talking underwater is influenced by the internal geometry of the life support equipment and constraints on the communications systems as well as the physical and physiological influences of the environment on the processes of speaking and vocal sound production. The use of breathing gases under pressure or containing helium causes problems in intelligibility of diver speech due to distortion caused by the different speed of sound in the gas and the different density of the gas compared to air at surface pressure. These parameters induce changes in the vocal tract formants, which affect the timbre, and a slight change of pitch. Several studies indicate that the loss in intelligibility is mainly due to the change in the formants.

The difference in density of the breathing gas causes a non-linear shift of low-pitch vocal resonance, due to resonance shifts in the vocal cavities, giving a nasal effect, and a linear shift of vocal resonances which is a function of the velocity of sound in the gas, known as the Donald Duck effect. Another effect of higher density is the relative increase in intensity of voiced sounds relative to unvoiced sounds. The contrast between closed and open voiced sounds and the contrast between voiced consonants and adjacent vowels decrease with increased pressure. Change of the speed of sound is relatively large in relation to depth increase at shallower depths, but this effect reduces as the pressure increases, and at greater depths a change in depth makes a smaller difference.

Helium speech unscramblers are a partial technical solution. They improve intelligibility of transmitted speech to surface personnel.

== Video communications ==
Video cameras are often fitted to the helmets of surface supplied commercial divers to provide information to the surface team of the progress of work done by the diver. This may allow the surface personnel to direct the diver more effectively to facilitate the completion of the task, and can provide a permanent objective record of inspection work, allowing review by experts. Voice communication is always provided when diver video is used. The communications cables for these systems are part of the diver's umbilical. Video may also be used to monitor the occupants of a closed diving bell.

== Hand signals ==
A diver giving the signal for cramping

Hand signals are a form of sign system used by divers to communicate when underwater. Hand signals are useful whenever divers can see each other, and some can also be used in poor visibility if in close proximity, when the recipient can feel the shape of the signaller's hand and thereby identify the signal being given. At night the signal can be illuminated by the diver's light. Hand signals are the primary method of underwater communication for recreational scuba divers, and are also in general use by professional divers, usually as a secondary method.

Divers who are familiar with a sign language such as American sign language and equivalents may find it useful underwater, but there are limitations due to the difficulty of performing some of the gestures intelligibly underwater with gloved hands and often while trying to hold something.

=== RSTC hand signals ===
Member agencies of the Recreational Scuba Training Council (RSTC) in the United States have recognised a standardised set of hand signals intended for universal use, which are taught to diving students early in their entry-level diving courses.

These hand signals provide the following information:

- I am out of breath! Hands indicate rising and falling chest.
- Go that way: Fist with one hand, thumb extended and pointing in the direction indicated.
- Go under, over or around: With palm down, hand motion used to indicate intended route to go under, over or around an obstacle.
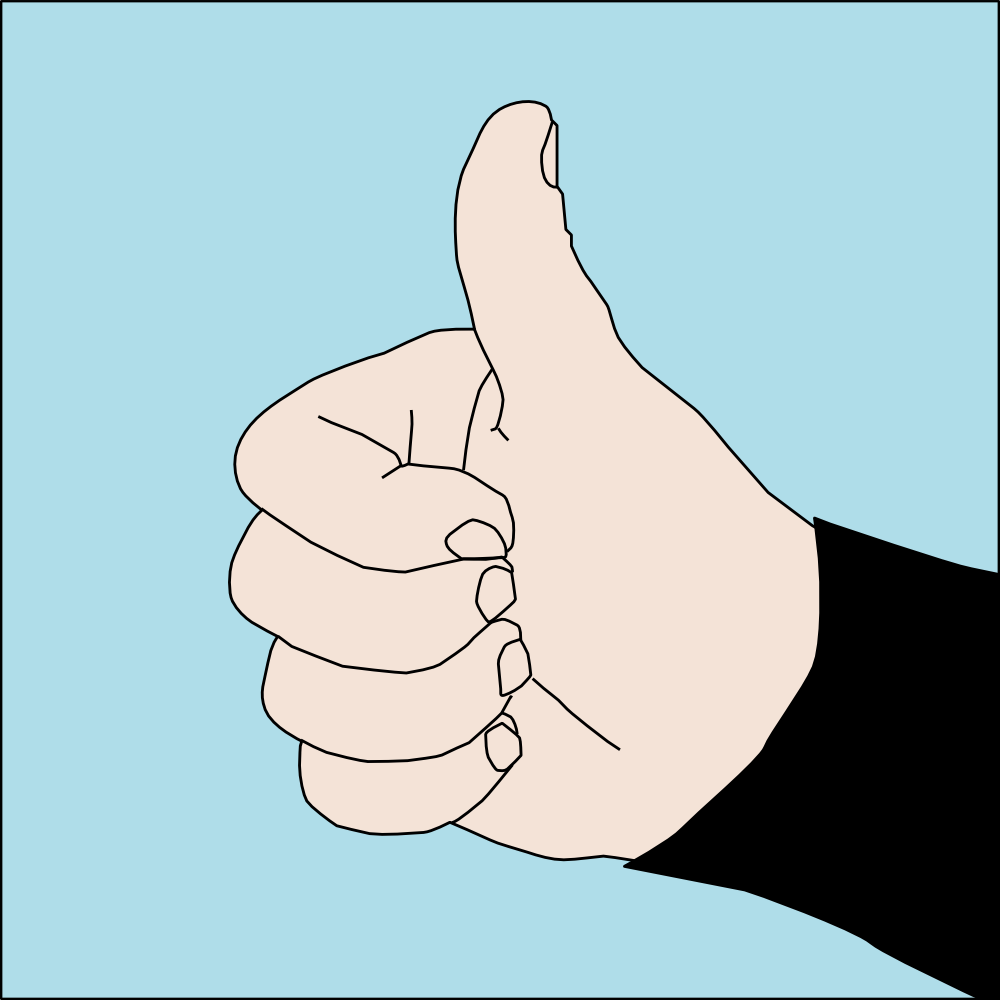
Ascend, or I am going up: A fist is made with one hand, thumb extended upward, and hand is moved upward to emphasize direction of travel.

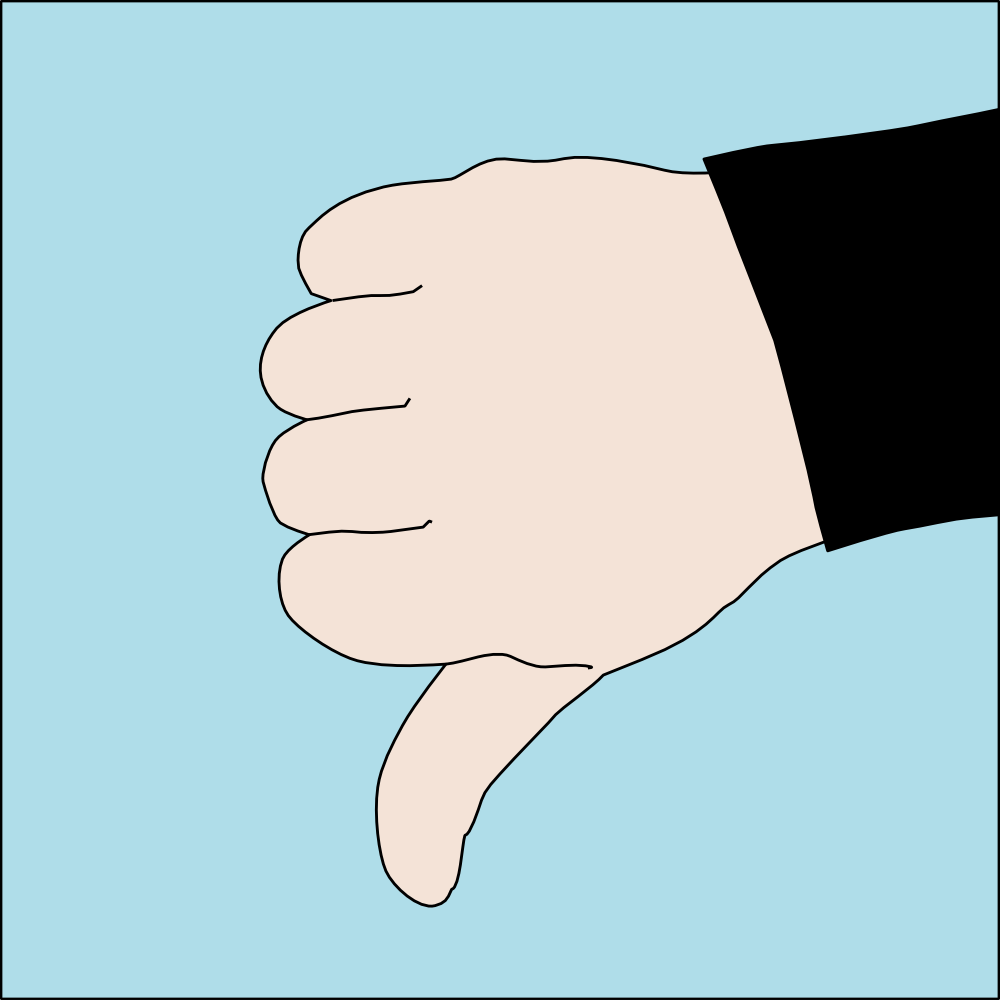
Descend, or I am going down: A fist is made with one hand, thumb extended downward, and hand is moved downward to emphasize direction of travel.

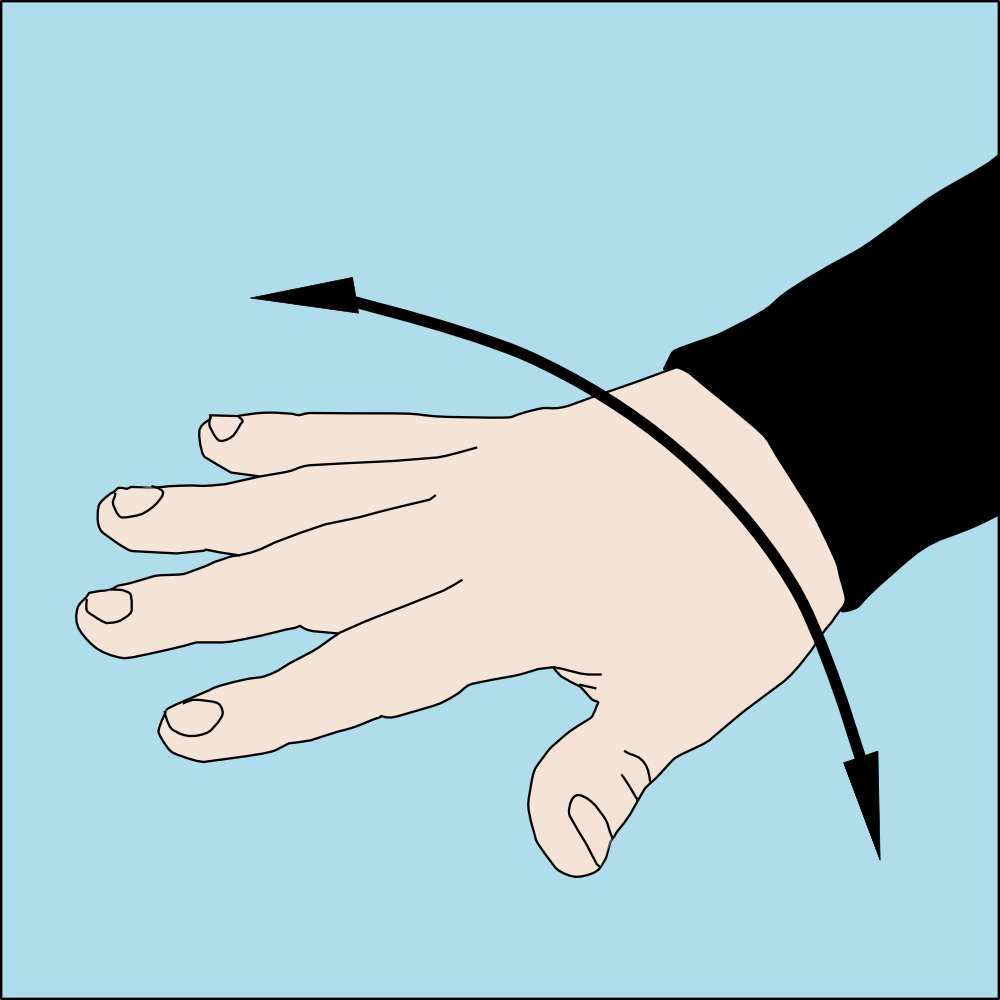
Something is wrong: An open hand with palm down and fingers apart is rocked back and forth on the axis of the forearm.

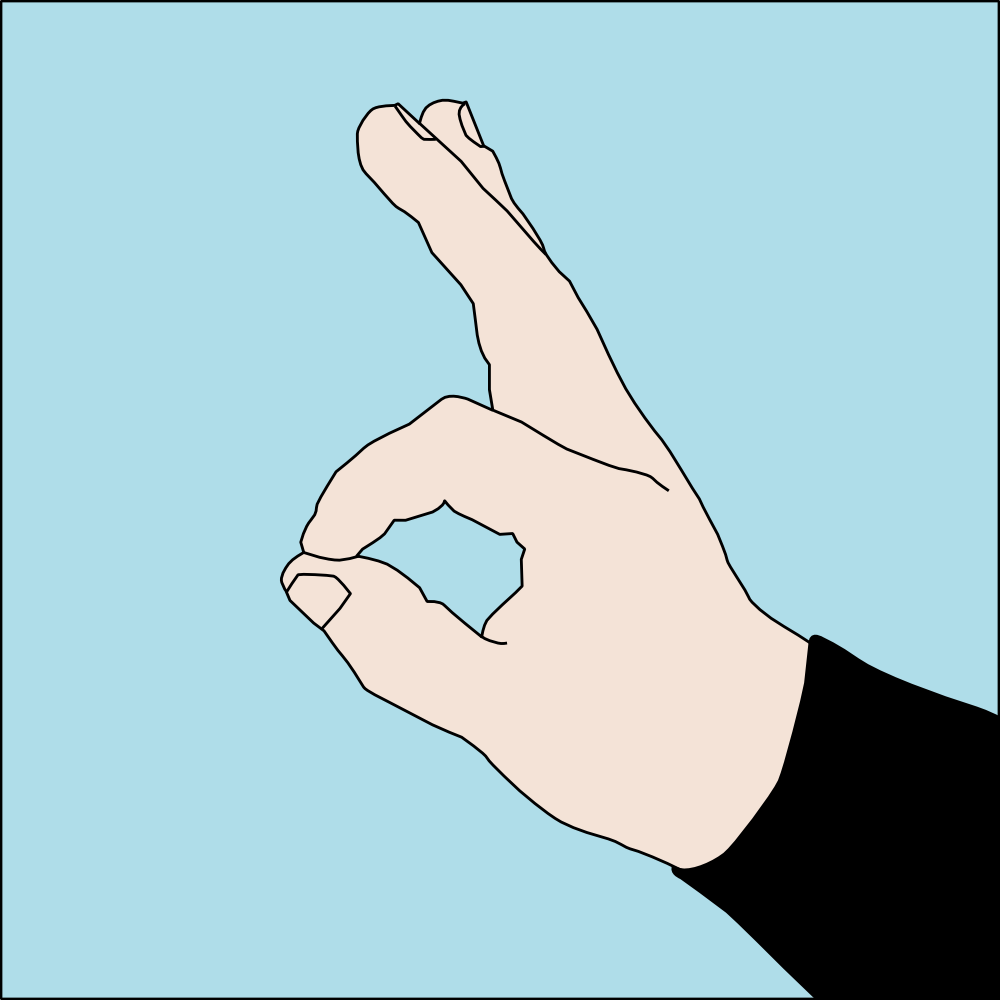
Are you OK? or I am OK! A circle is made with thumb and forefinger, extending the remaining fingers if possible.

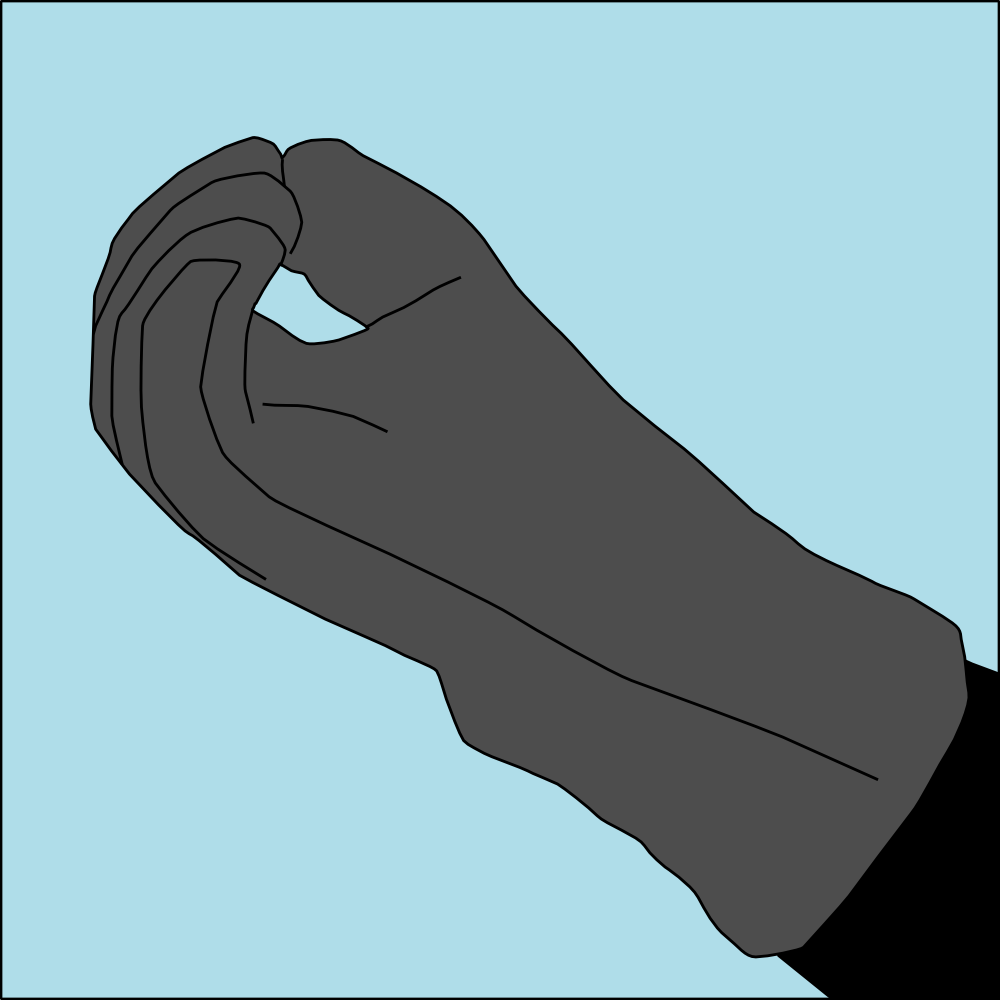
The OK sign also may be made without extending the fingers if wearing gloves.

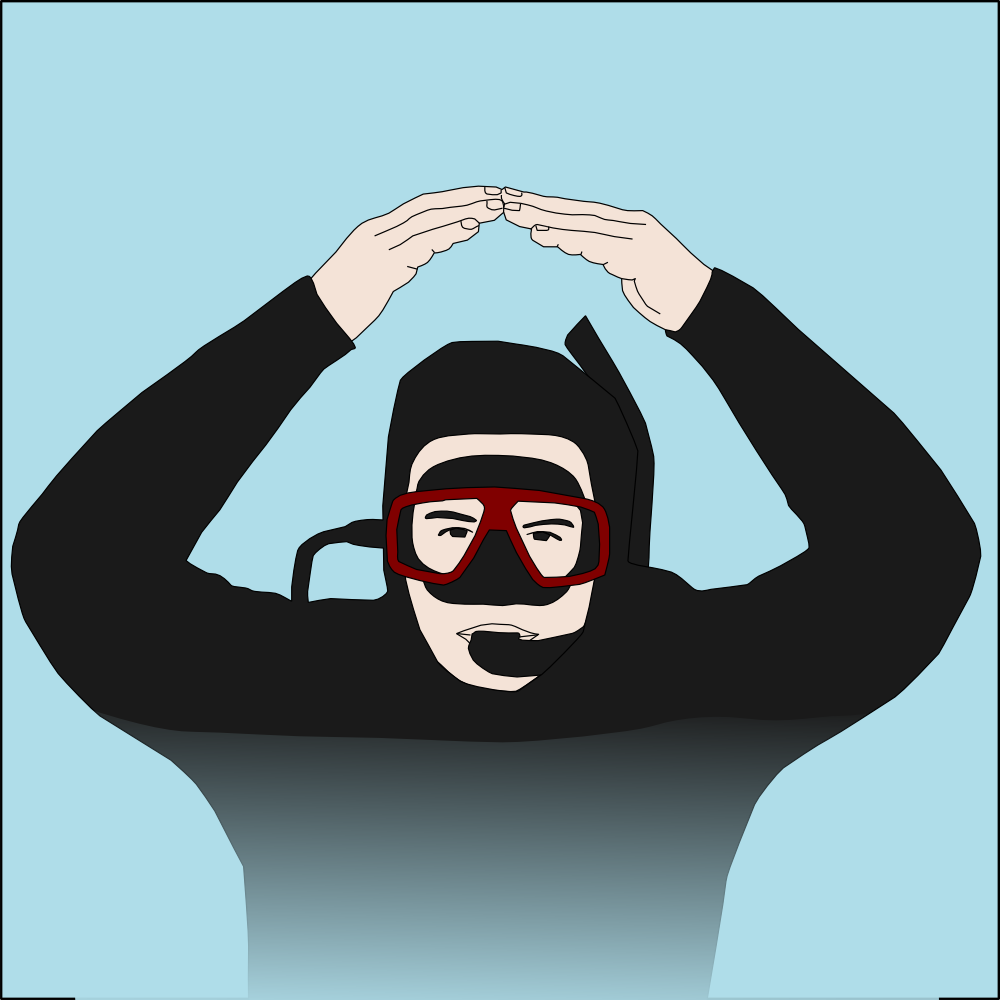
I'm OK: Forming a large circle with both hands above the head: Used at the surface as the OK hand sign can be difficult to see from a distance.

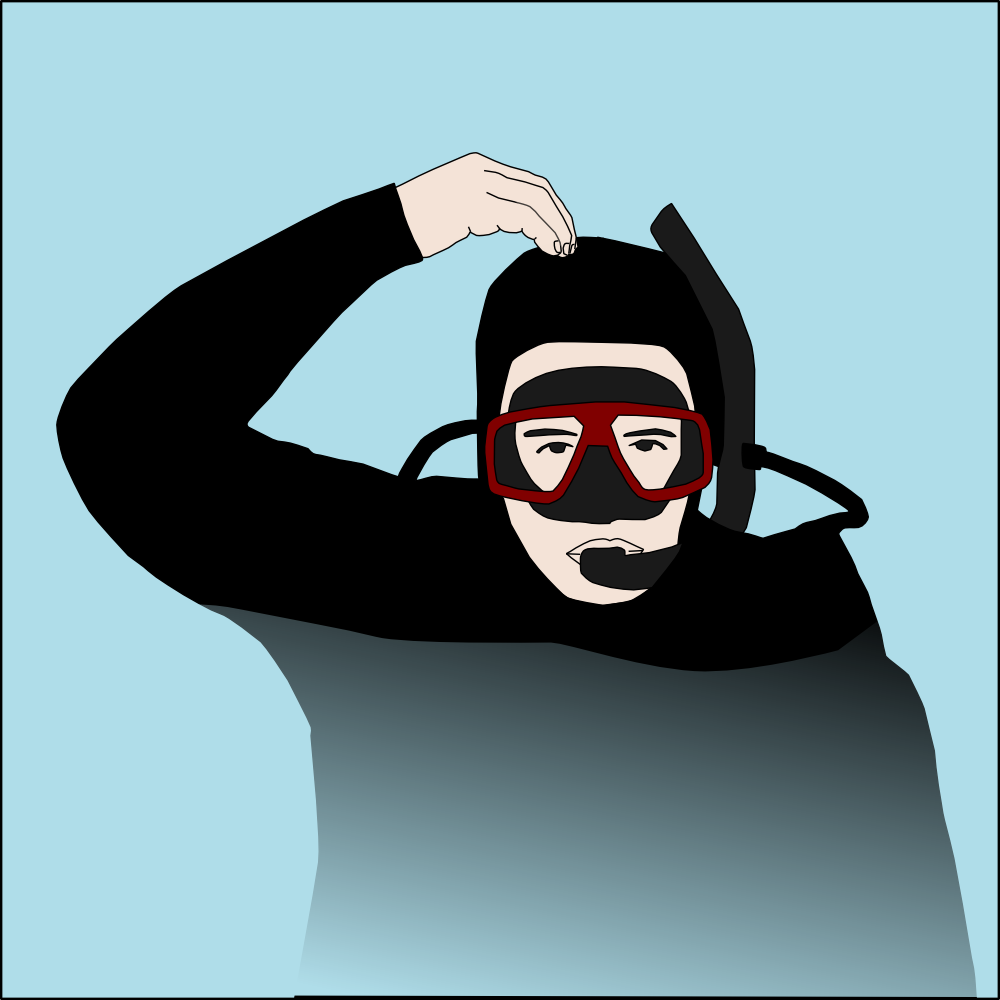
I'm OK: Touching or tapping the top of the head with elbow extended sideways: Used at a distance when the hand sign may be difficult to see. Alternative surface "OK" signal.

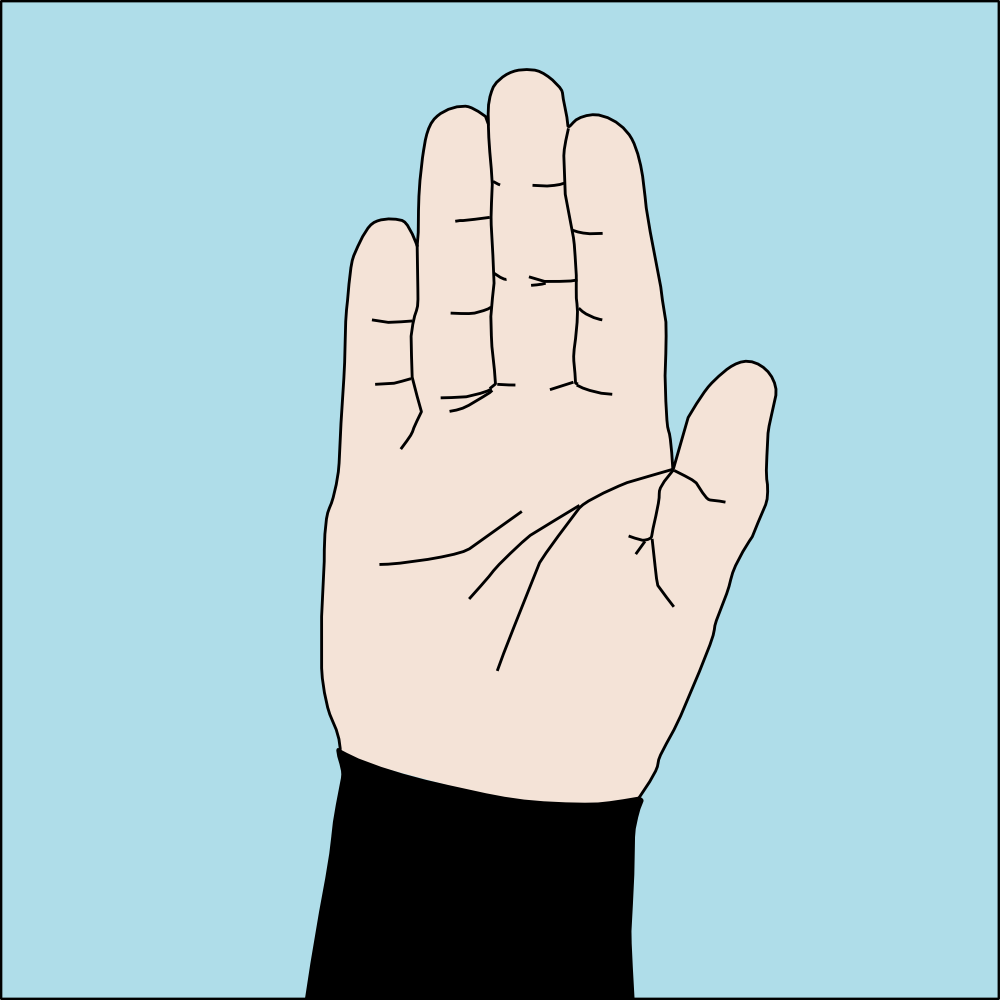
Stop! Hand raised vertically with fingers together and palm facing the receiver.

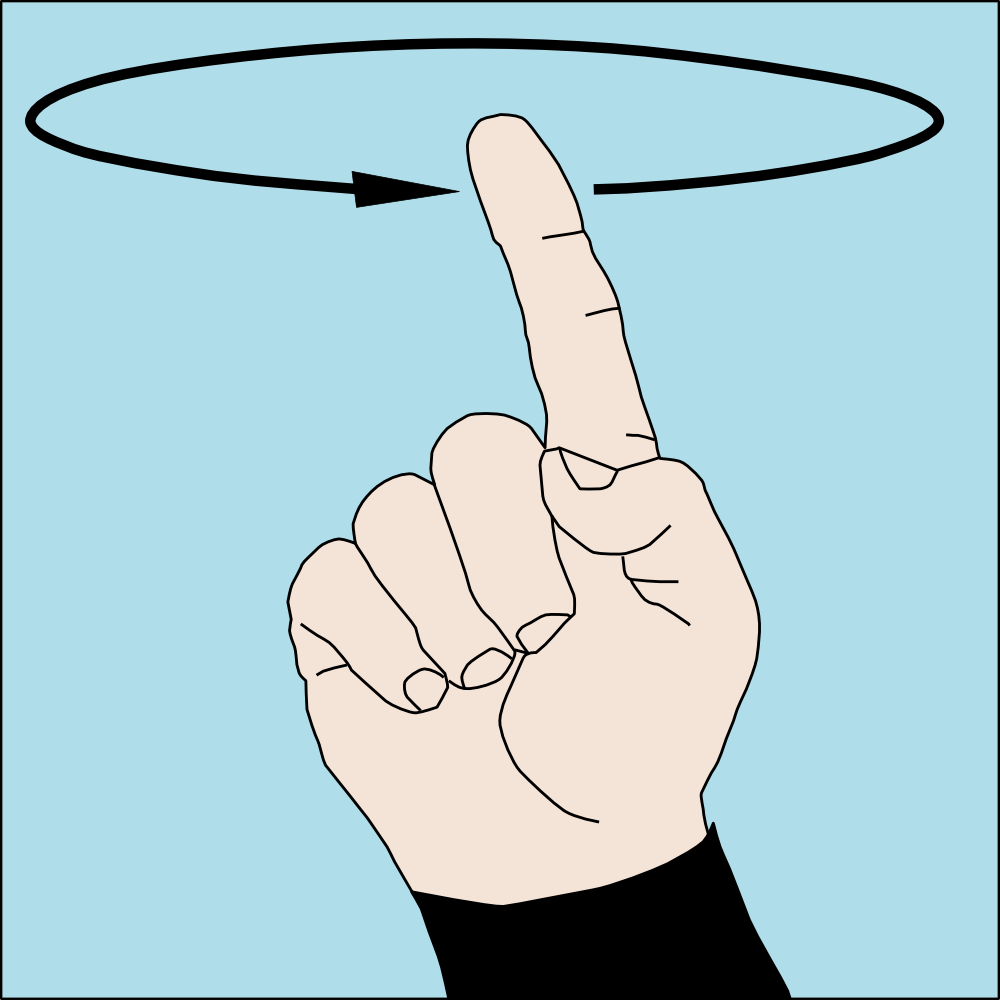
Turn around: A forefinger extended vertically and rotated in a circular motion.

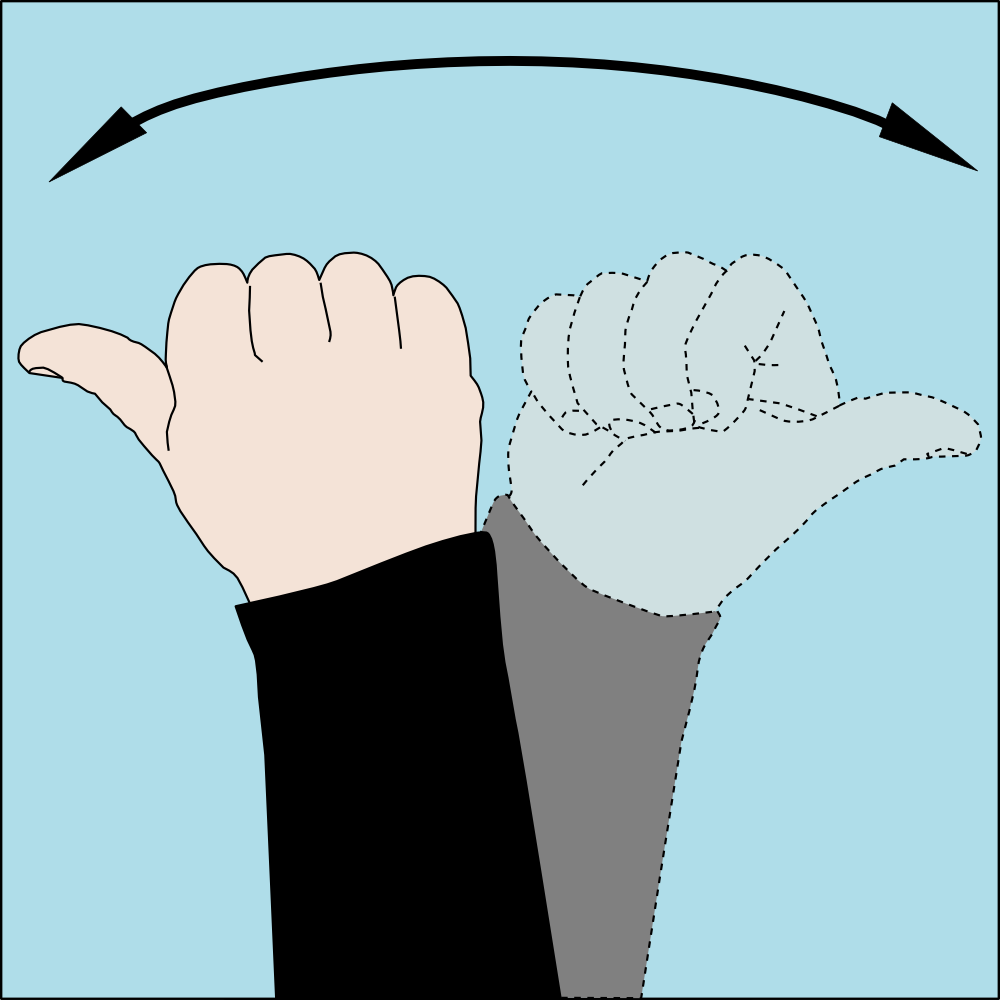
Which direction? A fist is made with one hand with extended thumb and the hand rotated on the axis of the forearm through 180° a few times to ask which way to go.

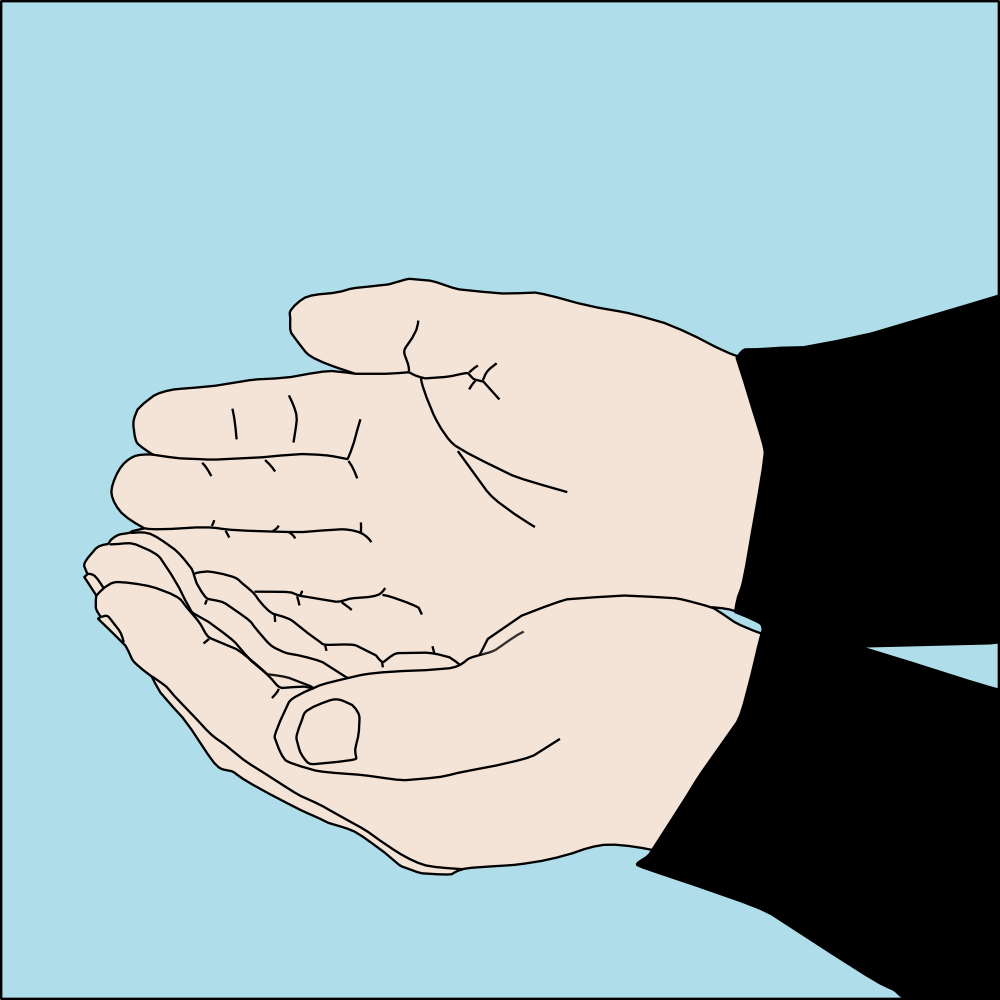
Boat: Hands cupped together.

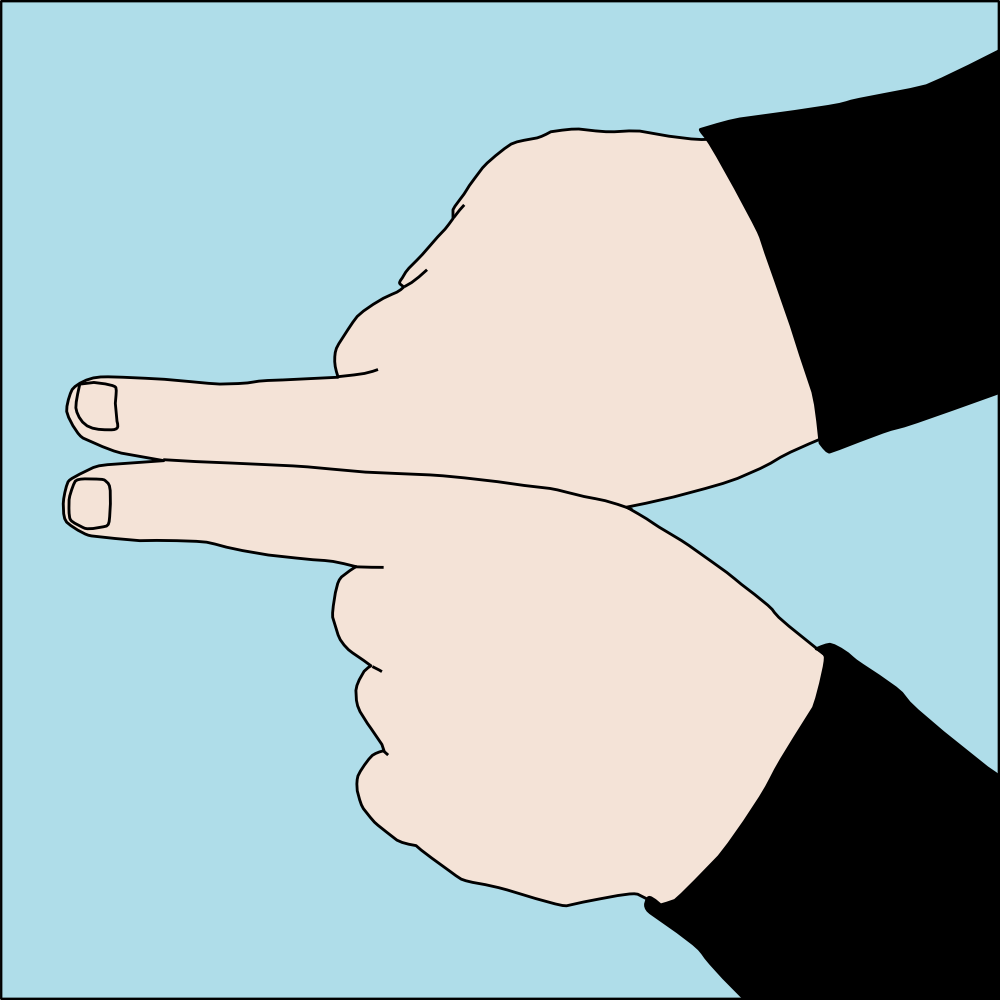
Buddy reference. Used alone: Get with your buddy: Fists made with both hands, forefingers extended, and hands placed together with forefingers parallel and in contact.

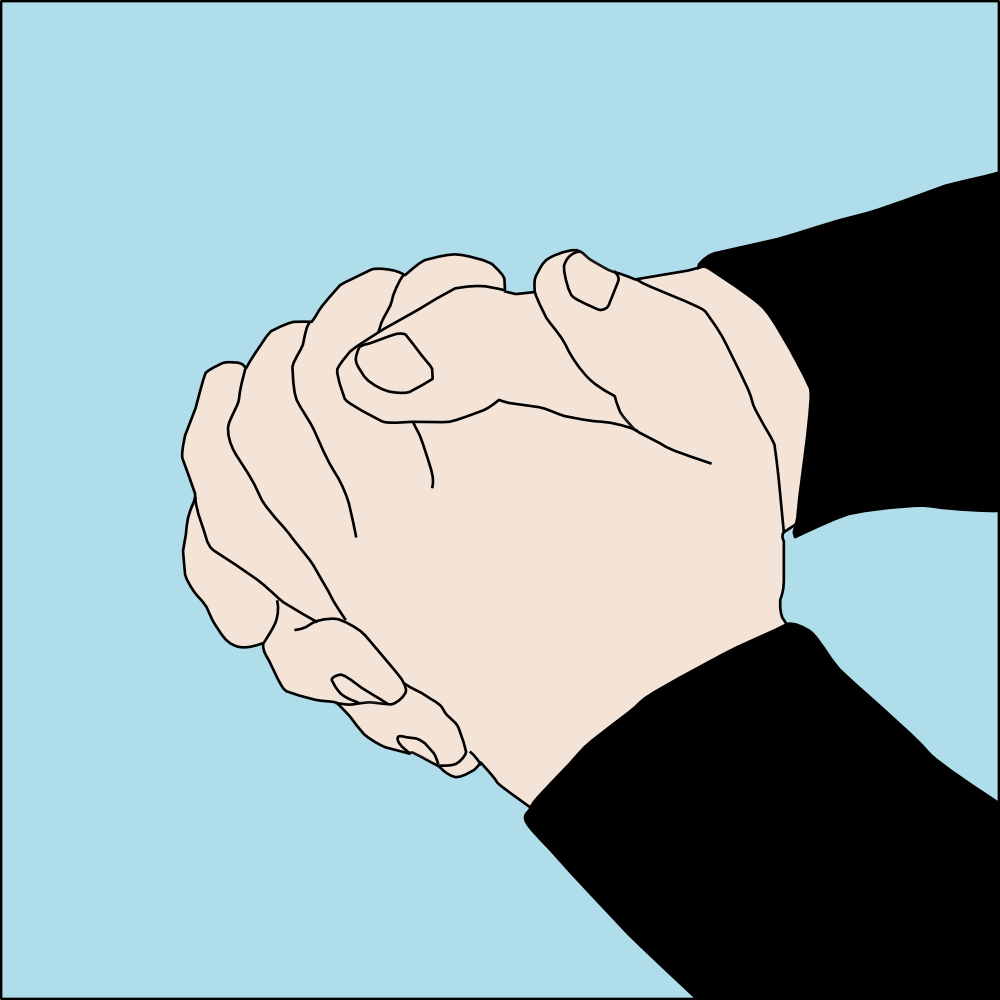
Hold on to each other - Maintain physical contact: Both hands clasped together.

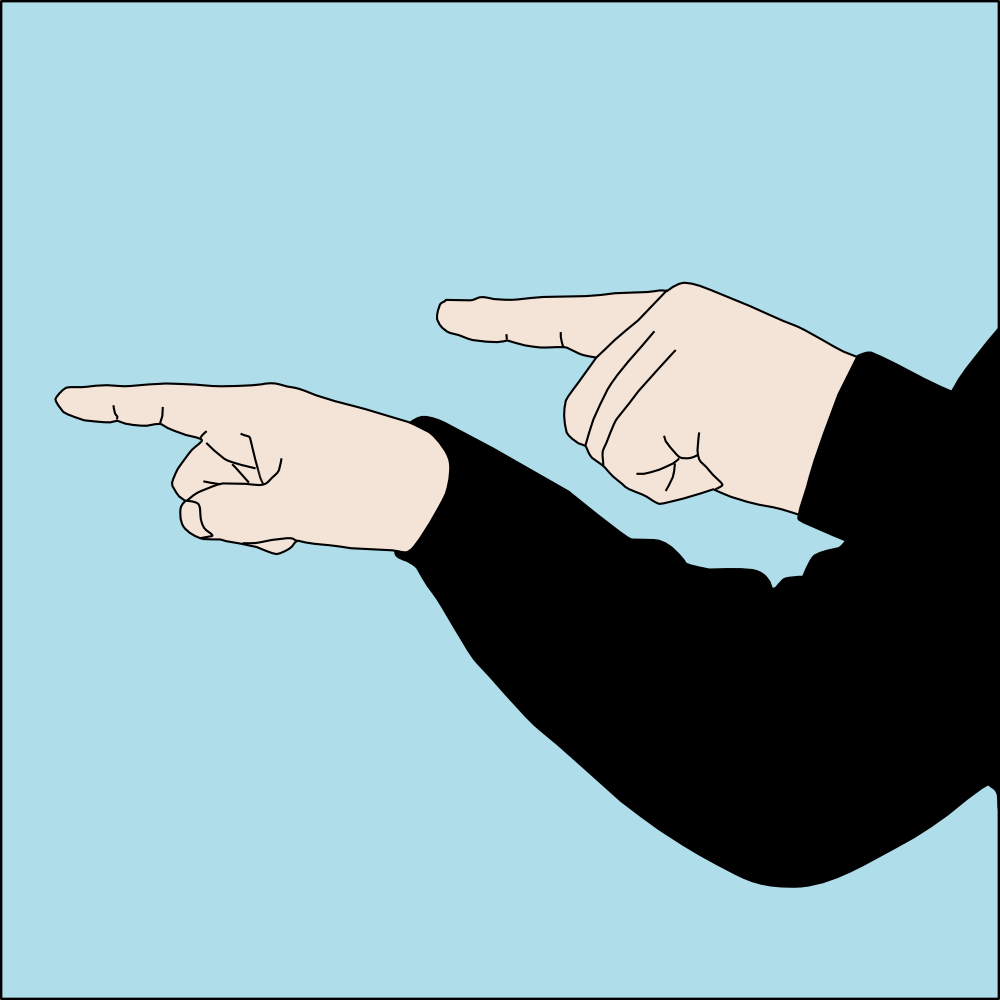
Who will lead, who will follow: One hand pointed at the diver who will lead then positioned in front of the body, pointing forward, then other hand pointed to the diver who will follow and positioned behind the first, direction indicated with forefingers.

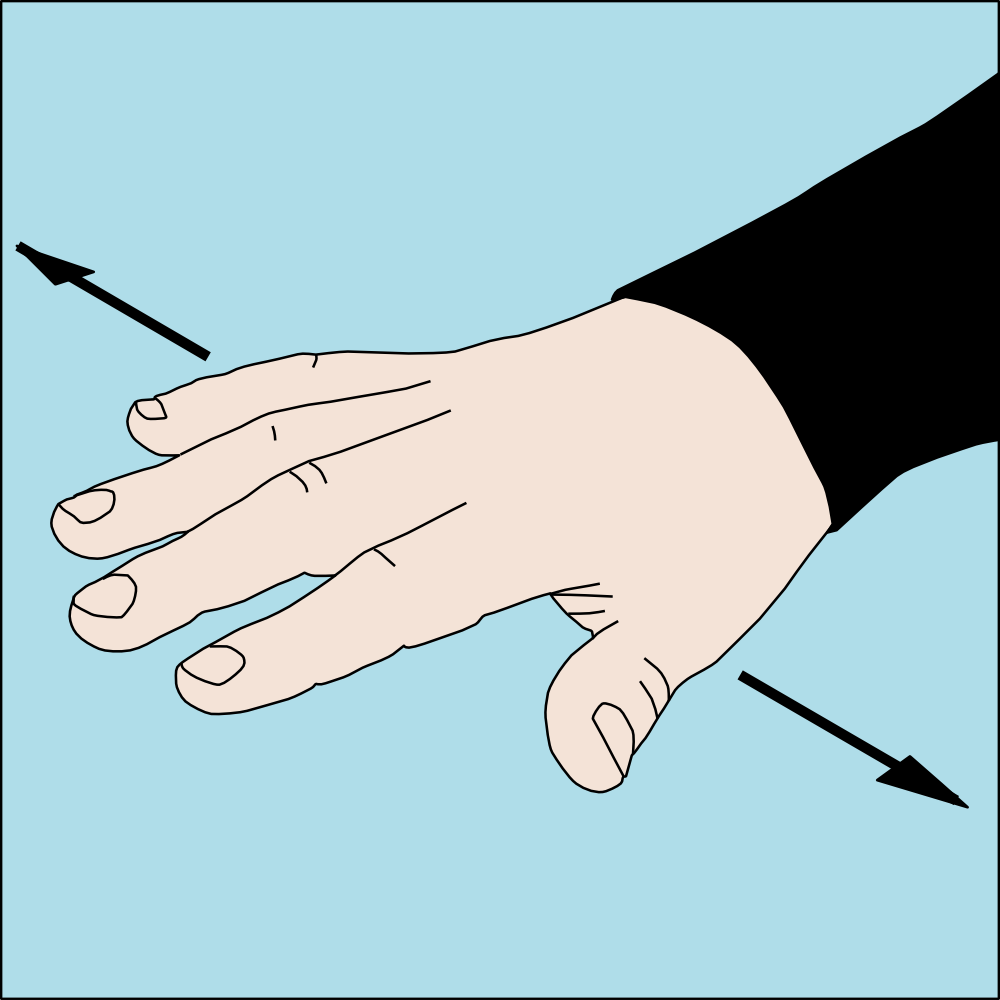
Level off at this depth: Flat hand with palm down and fingers spread moved slowly side to side horizontally a few times.

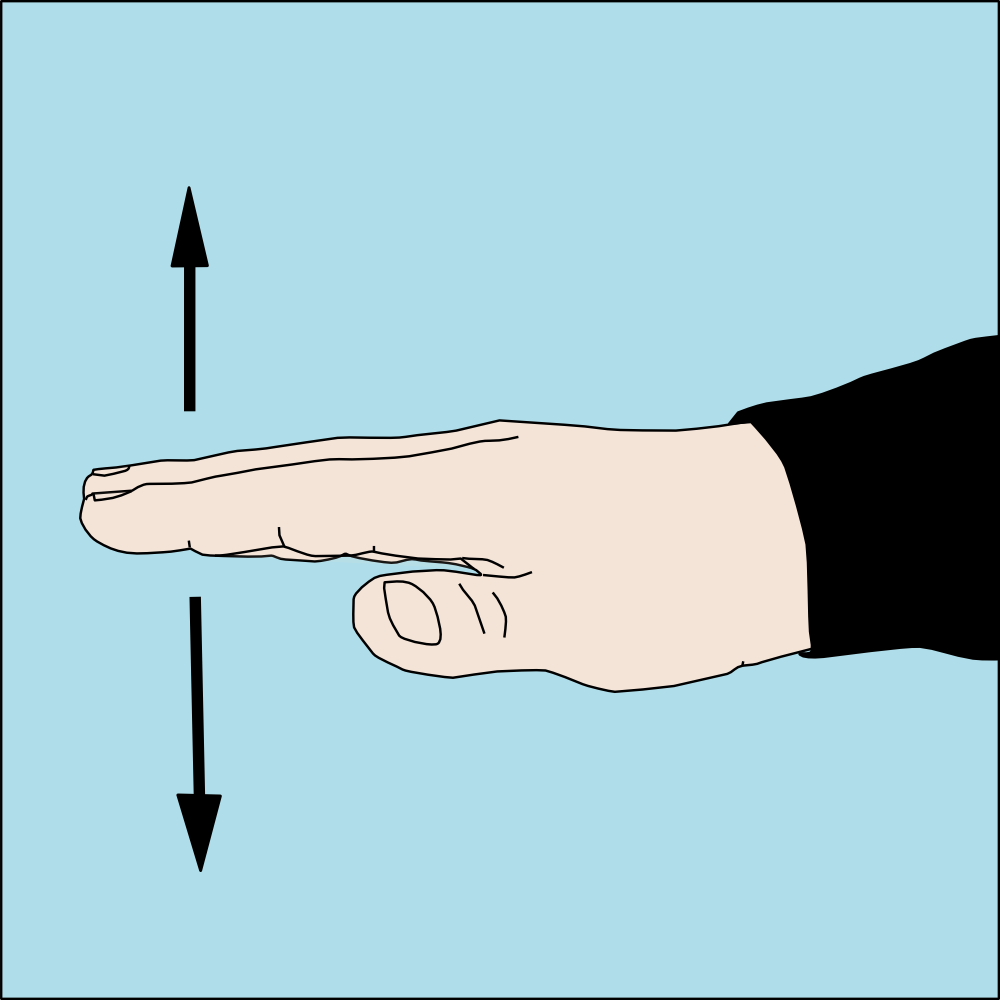
Take it easy, Relax or Slow down: Flat hand with palm down moved slowly up and down a few times.

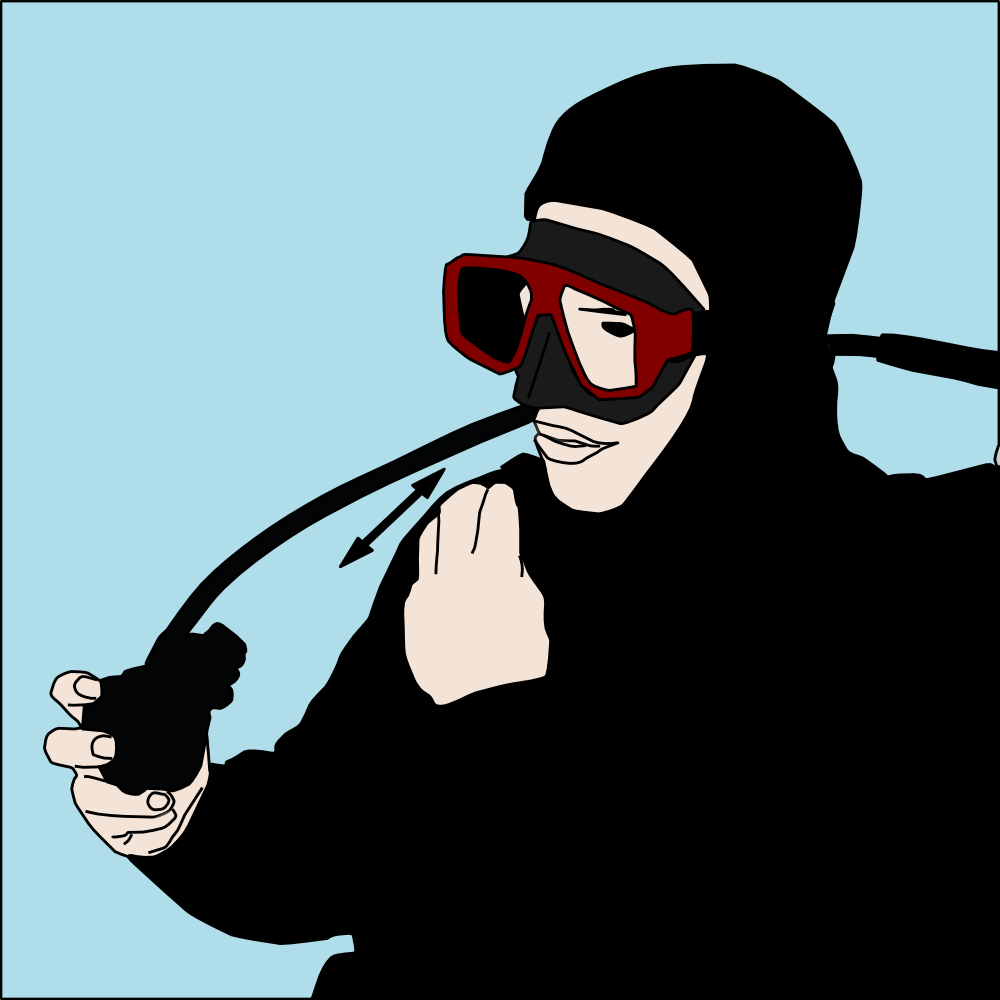
Give me air now (emergency implied): pointing to the mouth with thumb and fingers together, moving hand back and forth a short distance.

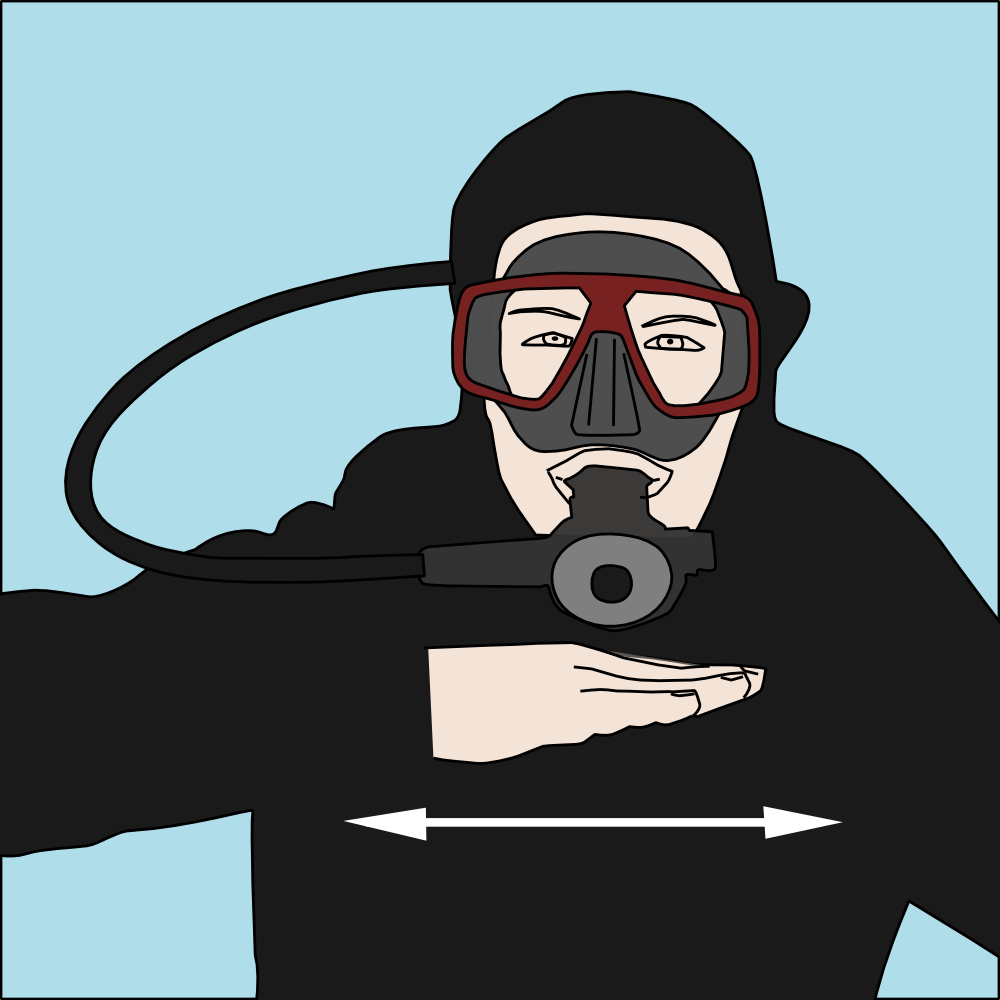
I'm out of air: "Cutting" or "chopping" throat with a flat hand.

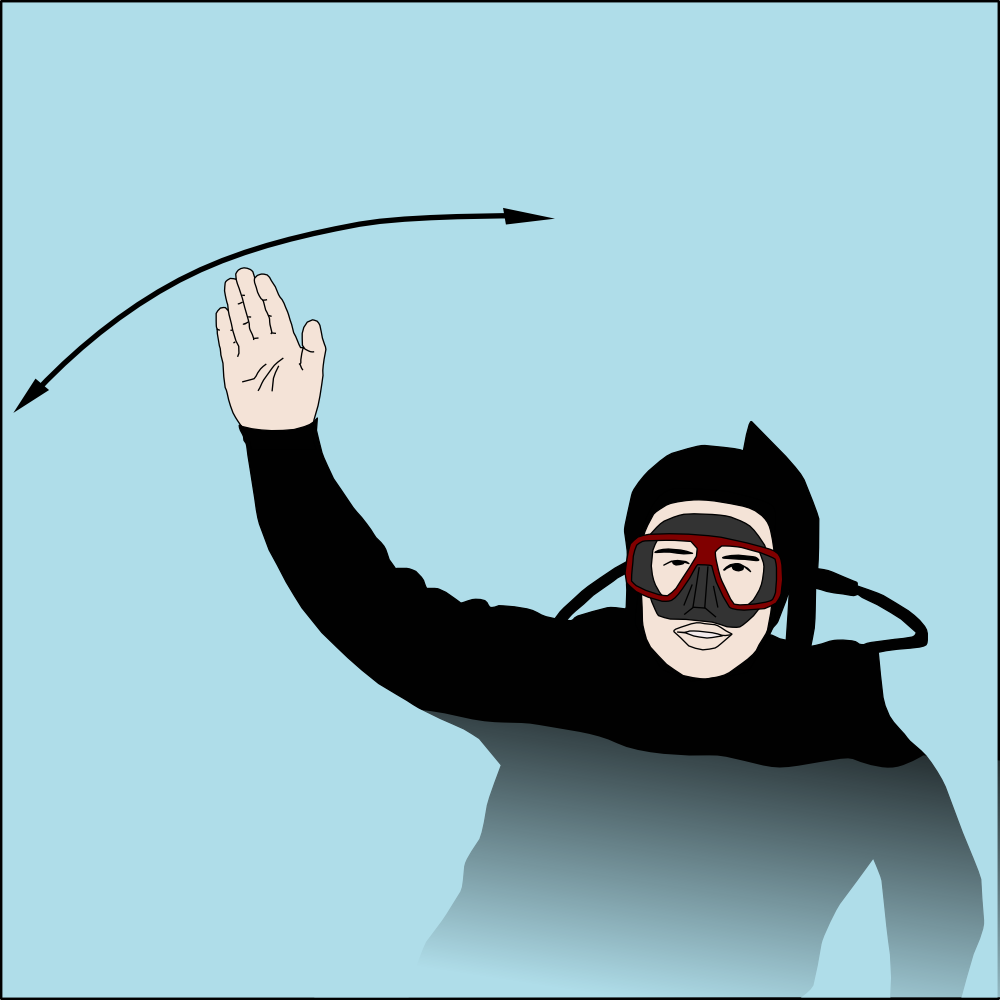
Emergency! Help me now: Waving one or both arms in a wide arc. Used on the surface.

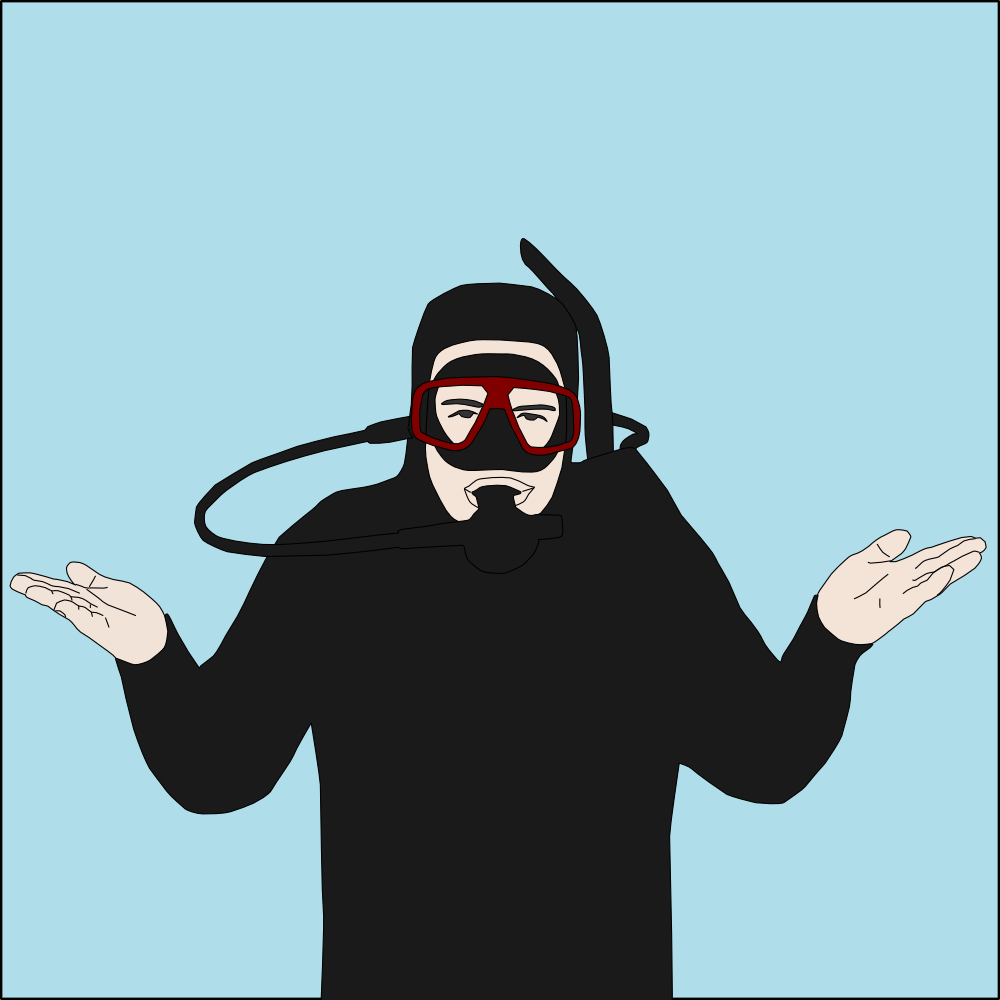
I don't know: Shrugging shoulders, arms bent, hands to each side, palms up.

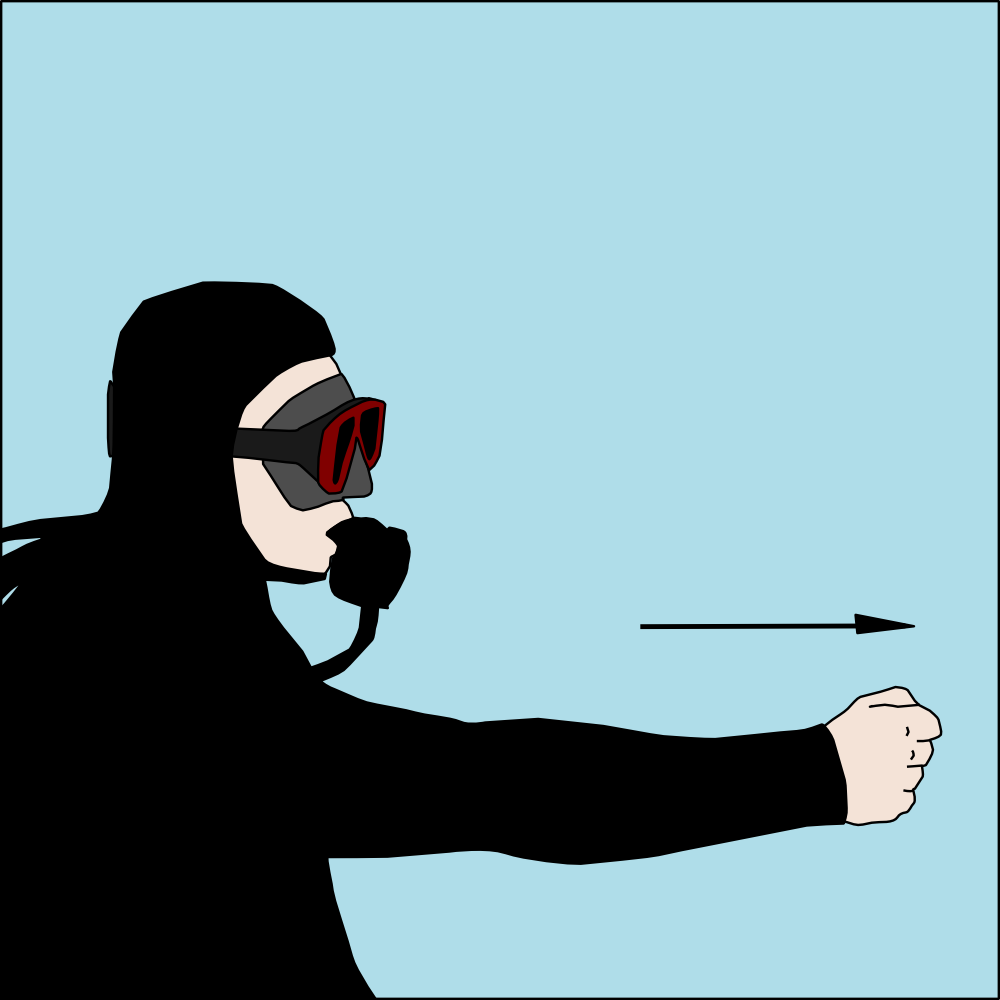
Danger in that direction: Clenched fist pushed/pointed in the direction of the perceived hazard.

I am cold: Hugging chest and crossed arms in front of chest, upper arms grabbed by opposite hands.

Look: Point with two fingers to the eyes.

Think. or remember: Forefinger extended from fist, touching the side of the head at the temple.

I can't clear this ear: Pointing at the ear with forefinger.

=== Command signals ===
A diving command signal is a safety critical signal that requires a response from the other diver(s) in a team. There are three: "Are you OK", "Hold your position", and "Surface" (terminate the dive).

=== Other commonly used hand signals and variations ===
Diving signals sometimes differ between groups of divers. There are regional variations and variations that relate to the type of diving. One of the items with the largest range of variations is how divers indicate the remaining gas pressure in their cylinders. Some variations include:

- The throat cut signal: "general danger" or "emergency".
- Tapping the mouthpiece: "share air".
- Pointing at the ear: "listen!"
- Hand cupped behind ear: "listen!"
- Pointing at someone changes the reference of the next signal from "I" to the diver pointed at.
- Flat hand swept over top of head, palm down: "I have a ceiling". This can indicate the diver has gone into decompression obligation or that there is a solid obstruction overhead. When ascending it means "stop here". (this is my decompression ceiling, or we are ascending too fast, or just generally stop ascending at this depth).
- Moving hand across torso in wave motion: "Current"
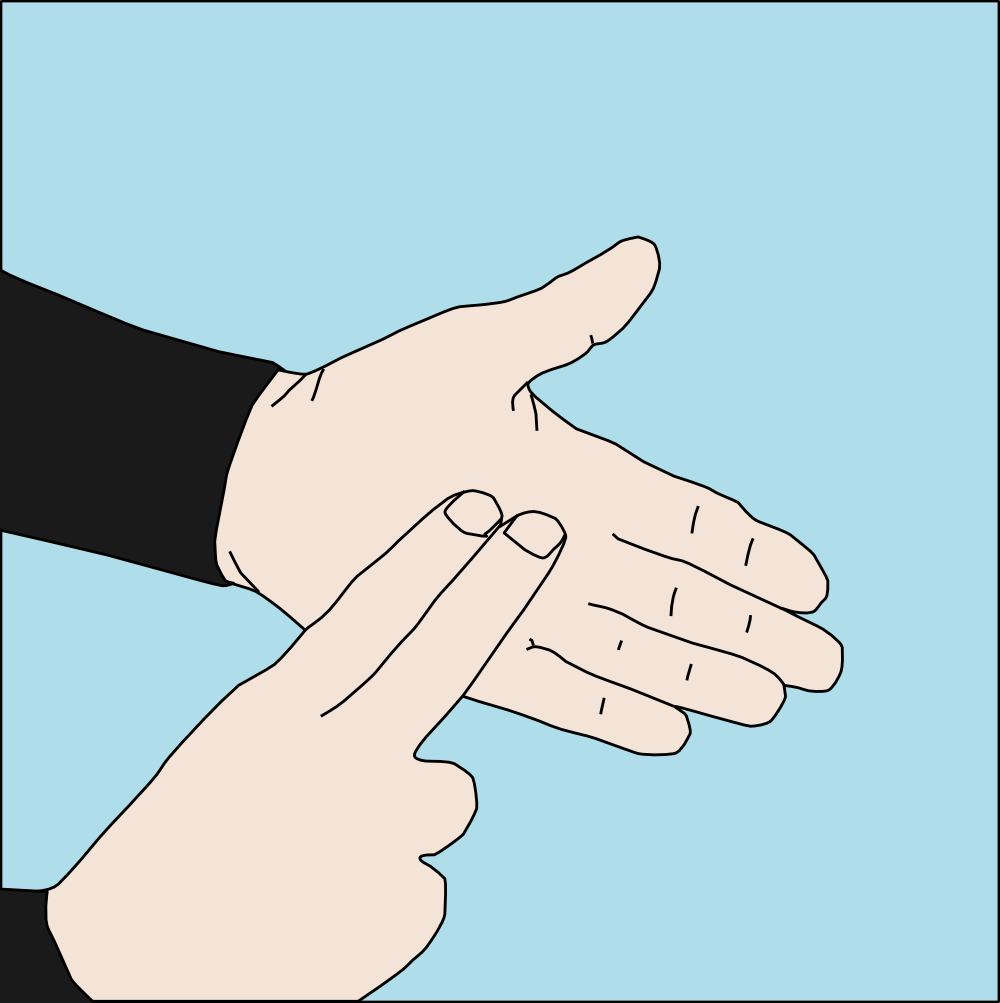
How much air do you have left?: One hand held flat, palm up, while index and middle finger of the other hand are placed on the palm.

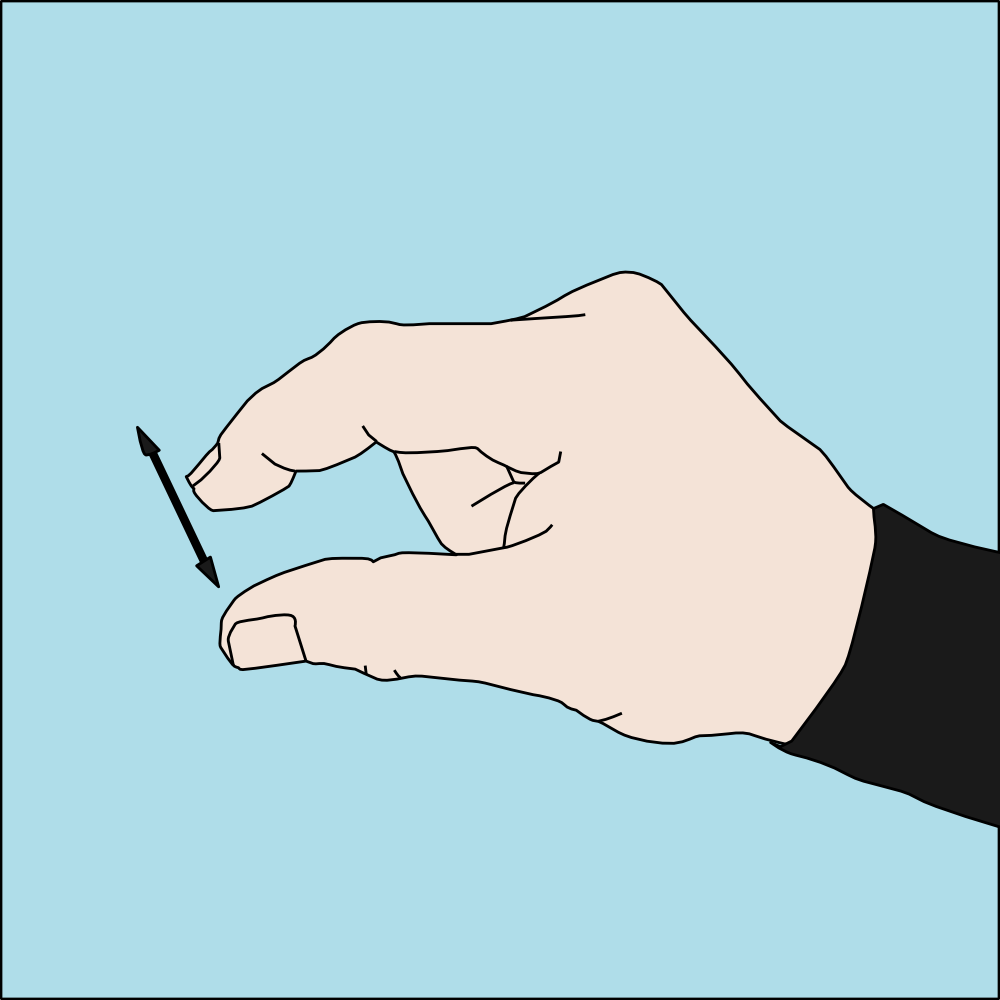
There is air leaking from your equipment: Index finger is brought down to thumb in repetitive motion. Size of movement indicates severity of leak.

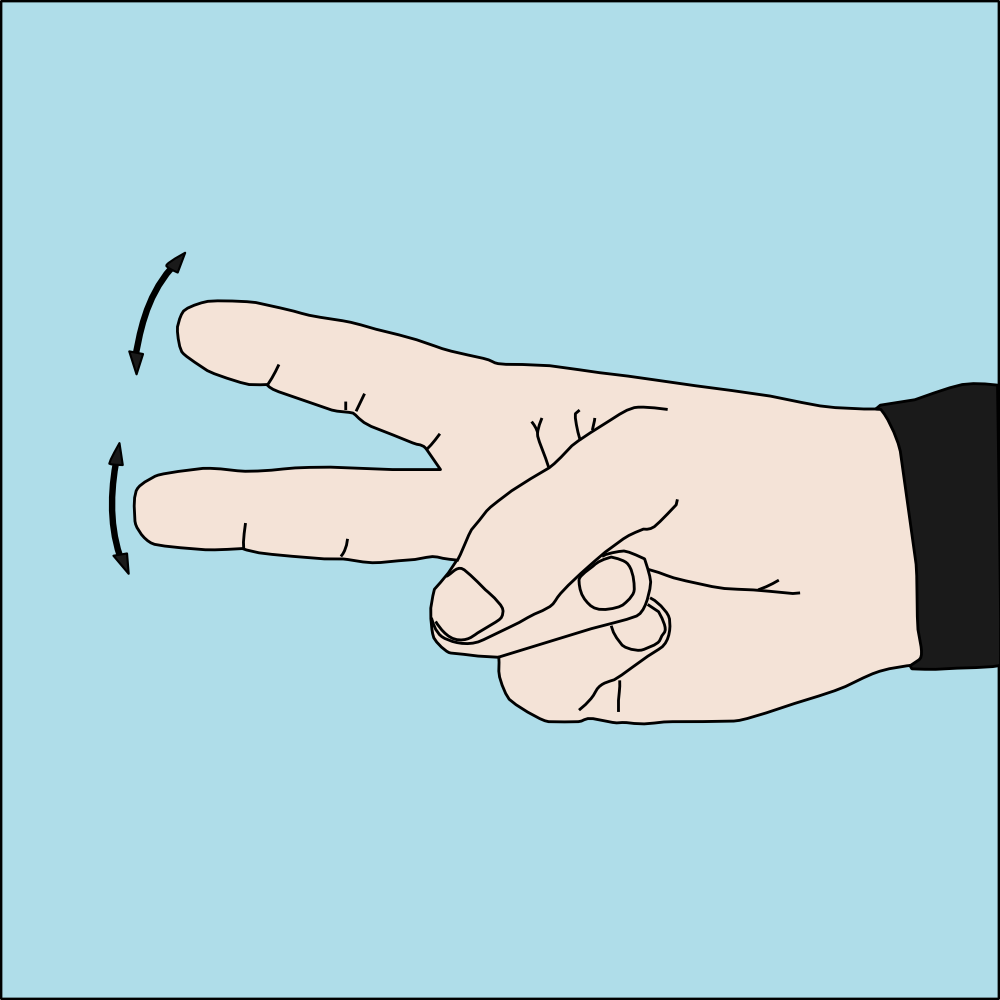
Cut the line: A request to another diver to cut a line or net. Often used in case of entanglement where the diver making the signal can not reach the point where the line should be cut.

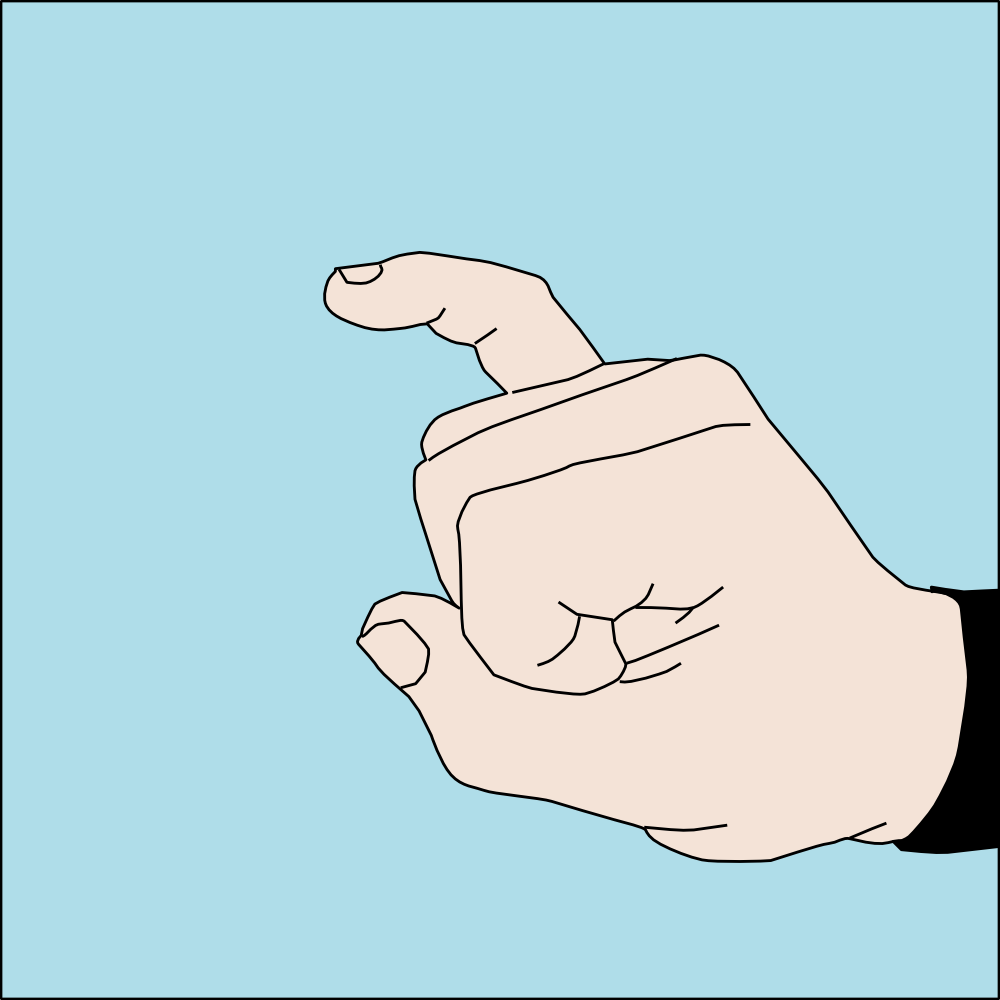
Decompression or Safety stop: Signal is used to indicate that the diver intends to do a safety stop at that point.

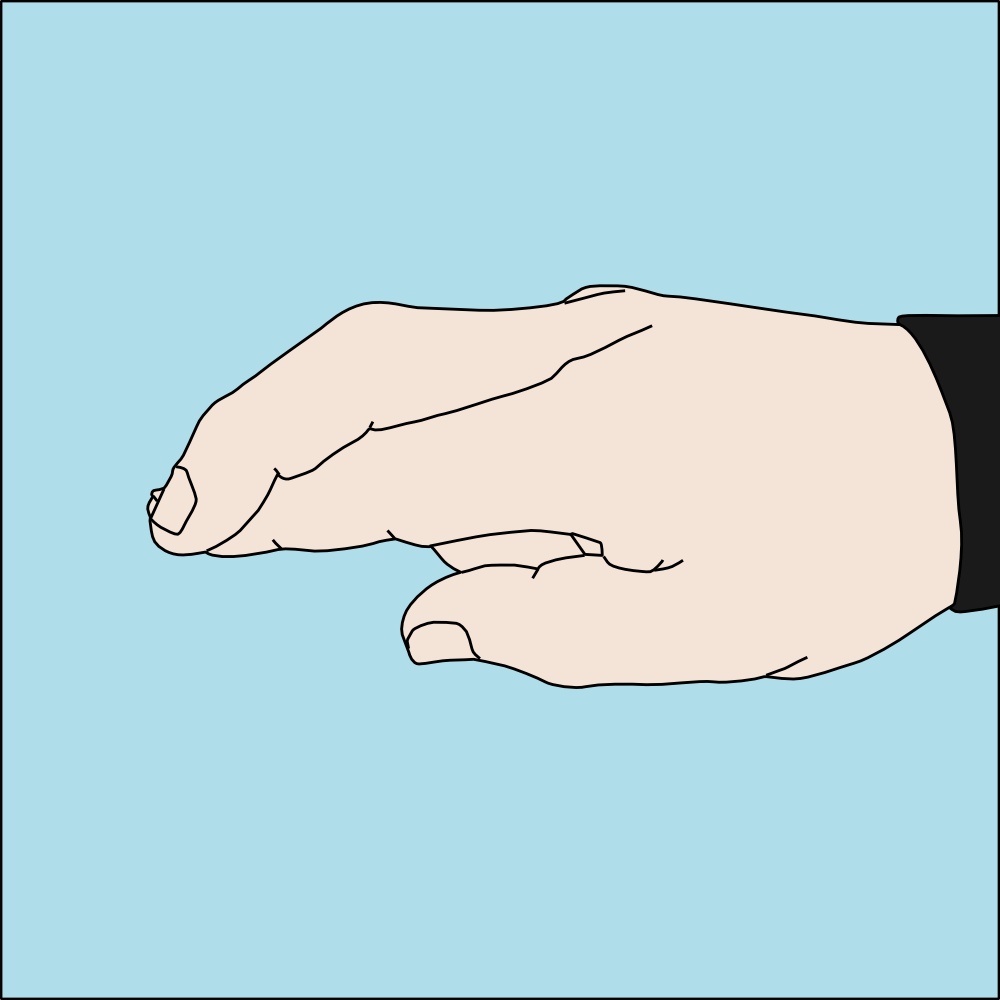
Line, Line tangle or Cutting the line: The index finger is crossed with the middle finger to indicate line. If the hand is moved in a figure 8 it means a line tangle. Pointed down and rotated means a line tie off. In combination with the cutting signal it means cut the line.

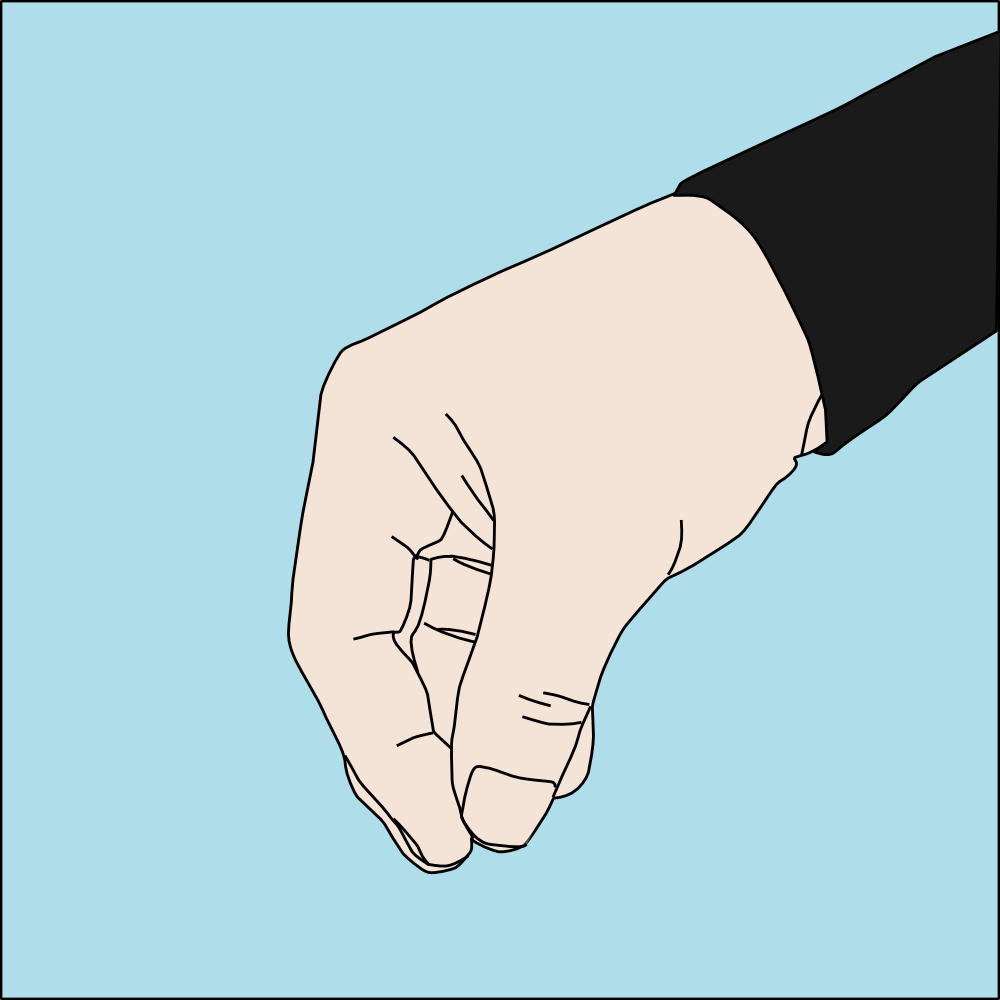
Silt, or Silting: Palm and fingers down, thumb rubbed against the tips of the fingers

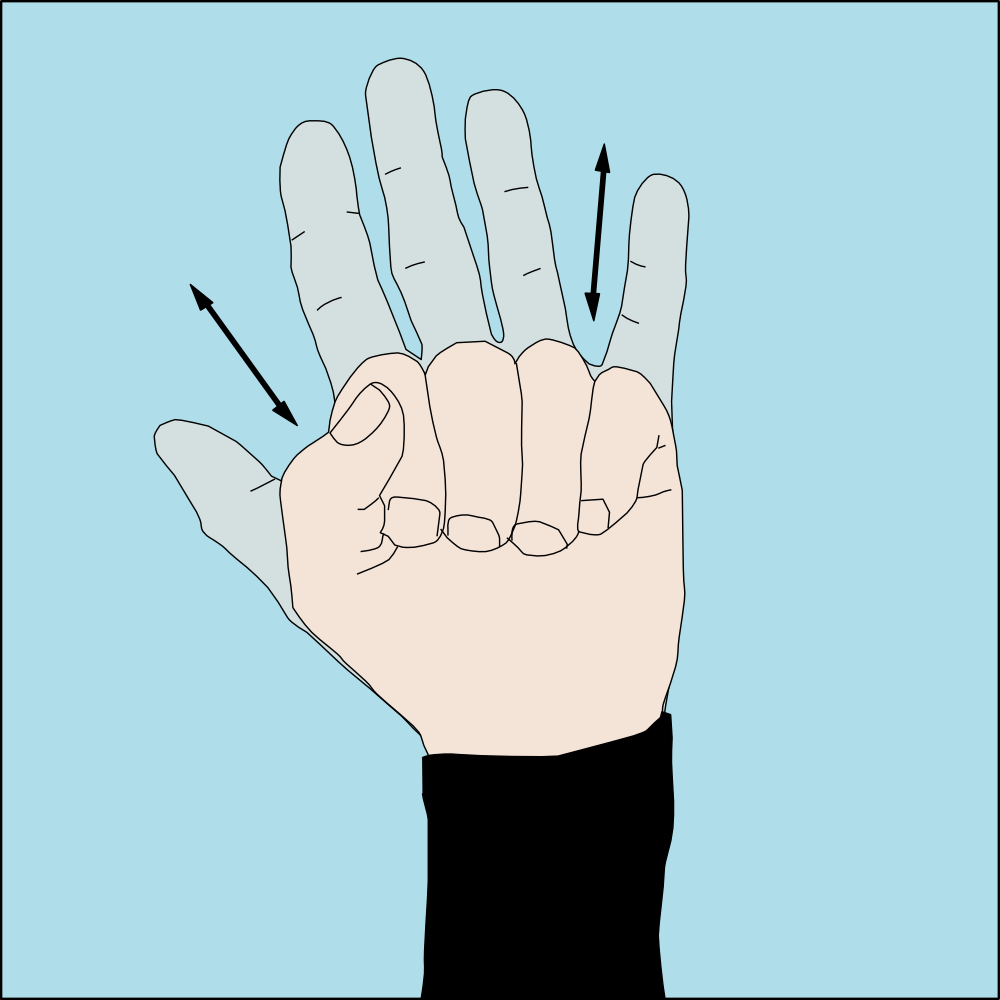
I have a cramp: Repeatedly clenching and unclenching fist, and point at cramped area

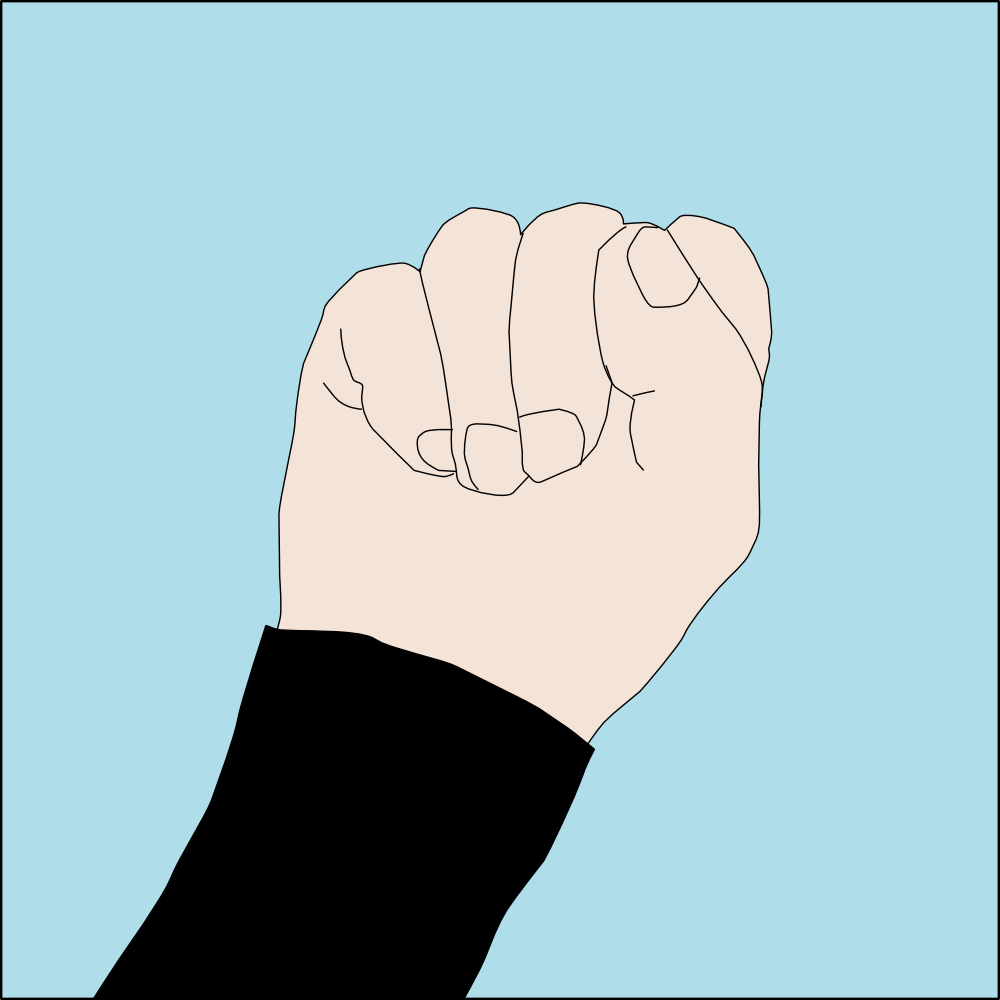
I am on reserve or I am on bailout gas or I am low on gas: Clenched fist held steady, about level with head or chest, palm side usually forward. Also may mean hold or stay there.

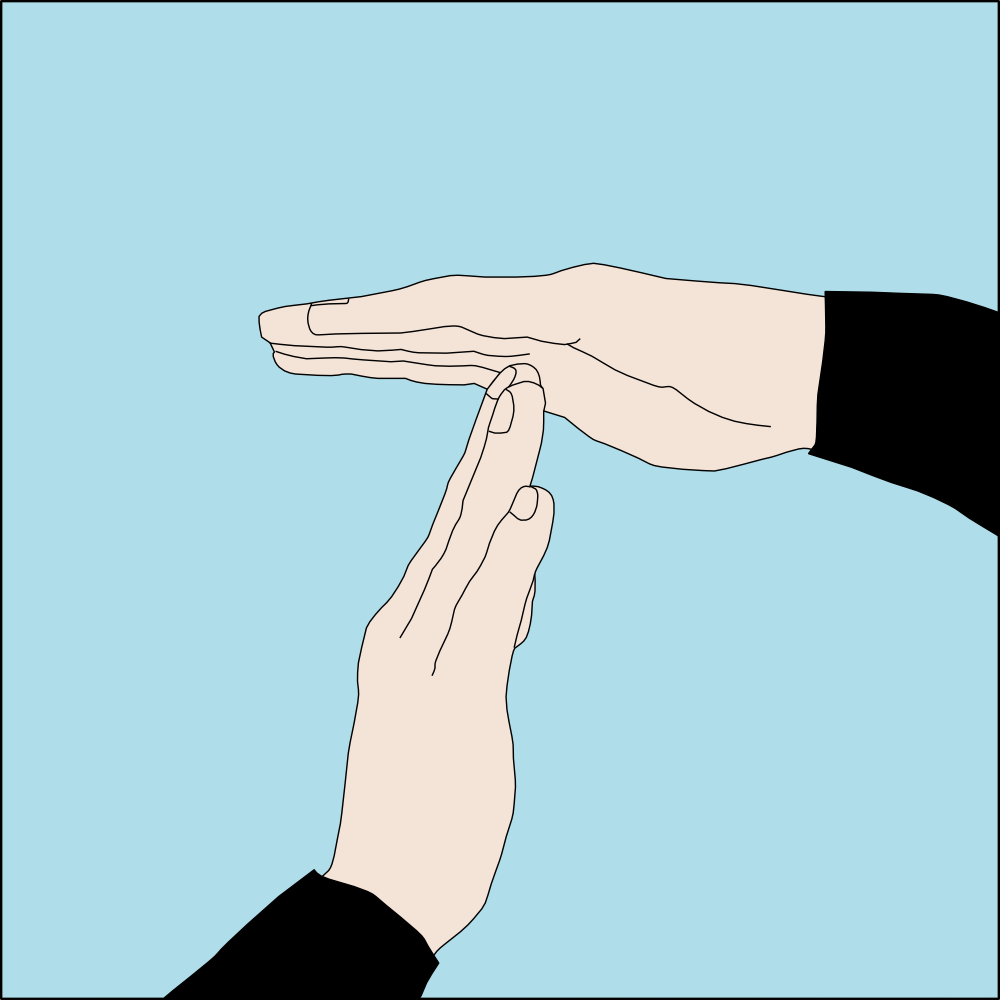
Time up: time to turn the dive and start heading back: Flat hand held roughly horizontal with tips of other flat hand's fingers touching the palm at right angles. Can also signify half of starting air remaining (in response to the "Pressure" signal).

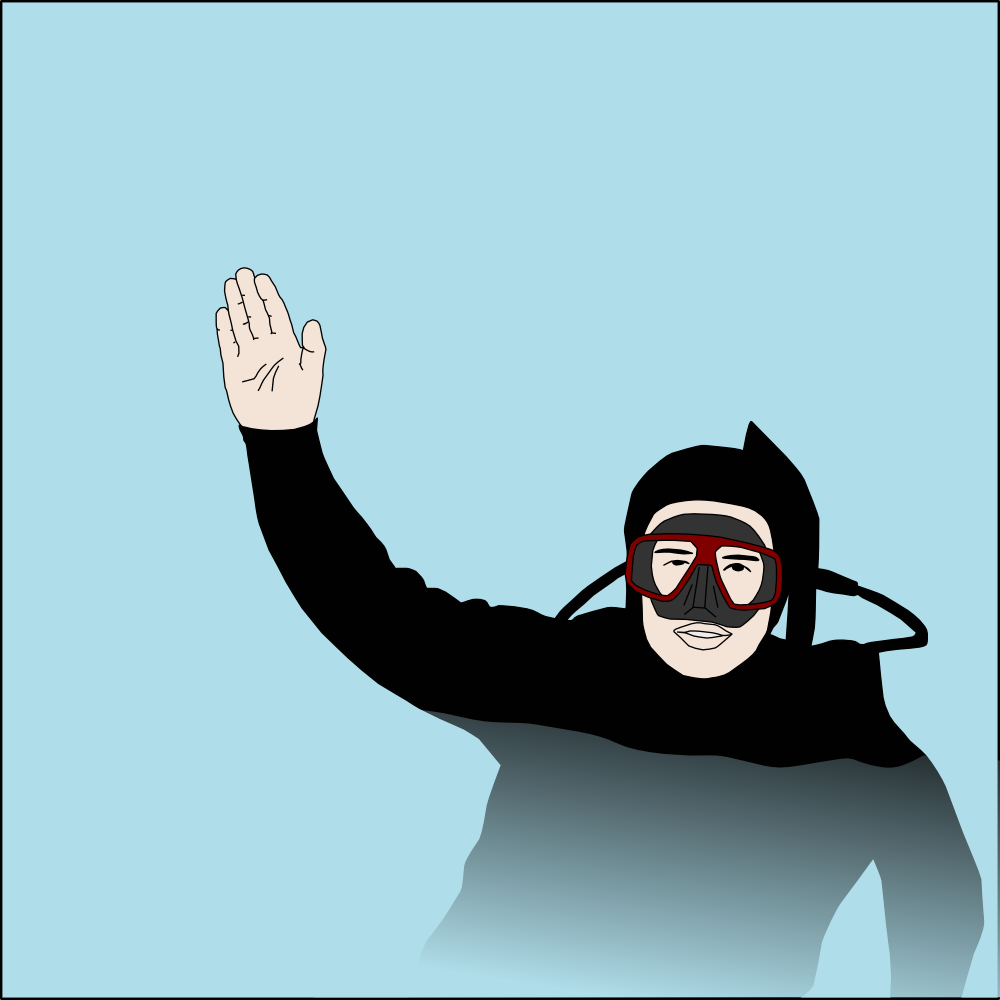
Come and get me as soon as you can, but not an emergency: Signal to boat. Arm held straight up at the surface

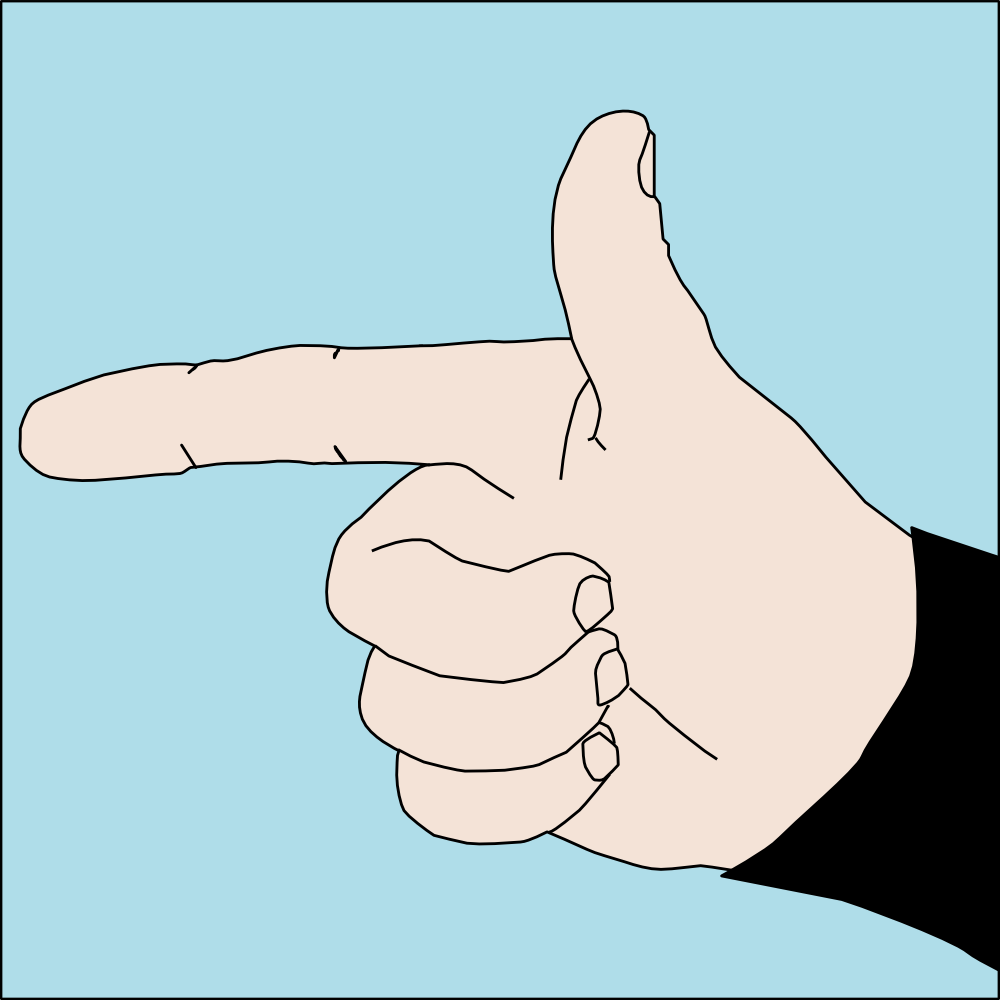
Turn or Terminate the dive. The thumb points upwards to indicate ascent, and the forefinger points towards the exit from a penetration dive. This signal may also mean This is the way out.

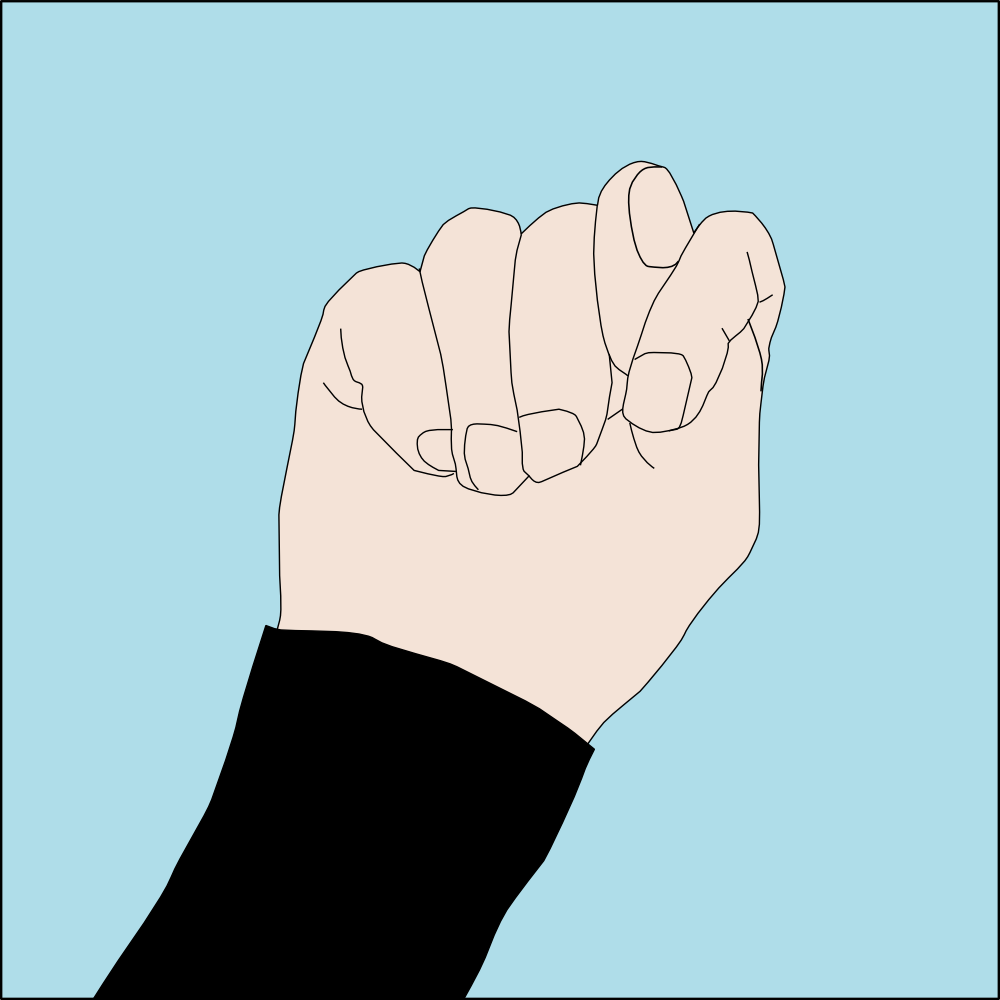
I am stuck: Thumb clenched between forefinger and middle finger of fist.

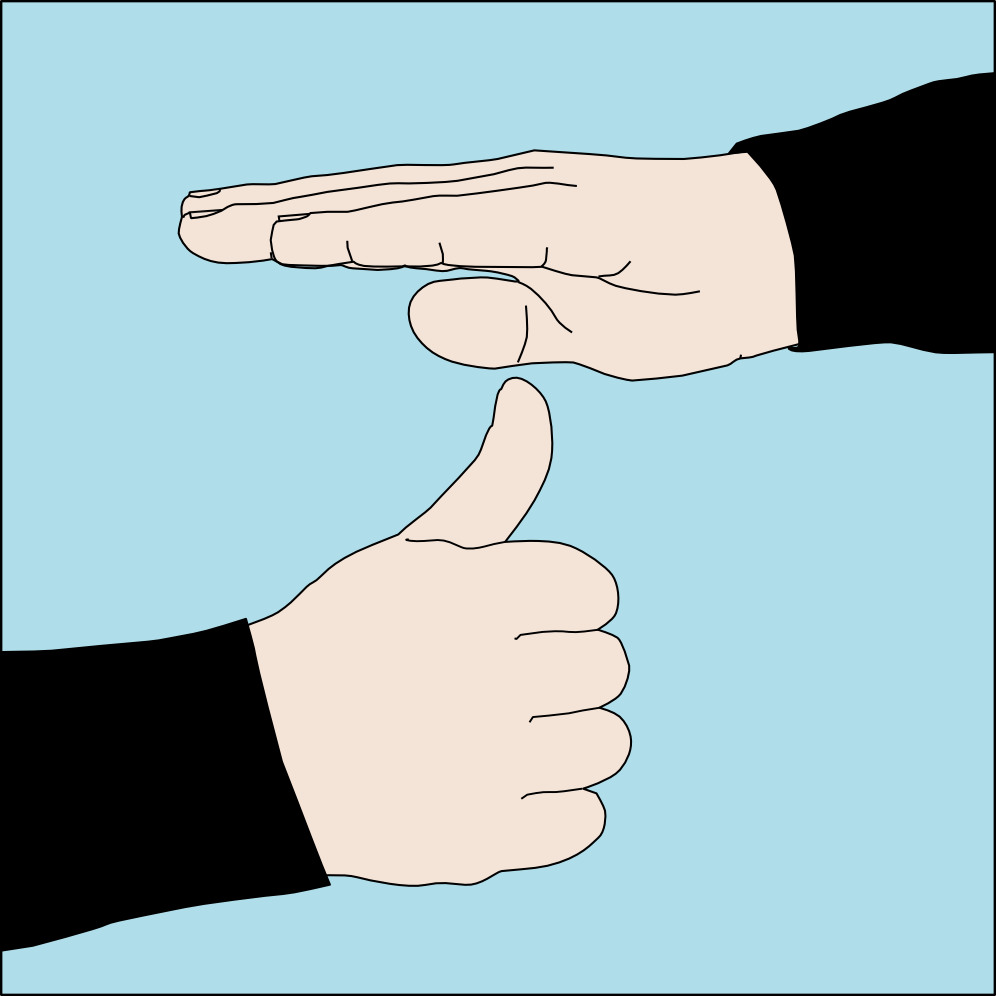
Ascend to stop: Thumb-up ascent signal below a flat hand, palm down.

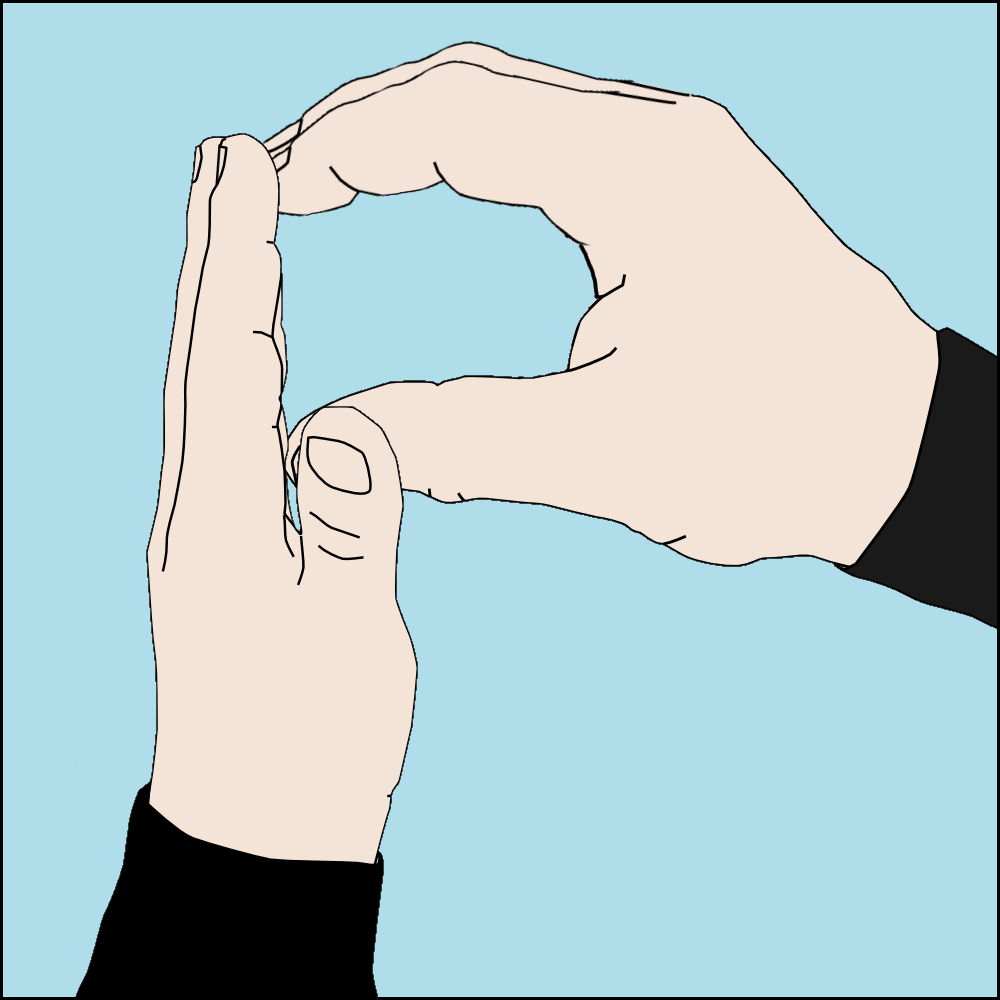
P for plastic: Form a "P" with both hands, signaling plastic is spotted and will be picked up.

Divers sometimes invent local signals for local situations, often to point out local wildlife. For example:

- I see a hammerhead shark: Both fists against sides of head
- I see a lobster: Fist with index and middle finger pointed out horizontally and alternately waggling up and down
- I see an octopus: Back of hand or wrist covering mouth, all fingers pointing outward from mouth and wiggling
- I see a shark: Hand flat, fingers vertical, thumb against forehead or chest
- I see a turtle: Hands flat one on top of each other, palms down, waving thumbs up and down together

Instructor signals:

- You (all) watch me. (usually before demonstrating a skill): Point at diver(s) with forefinger, point at own eyes with forefinger and middle finger, point at own chest with forefinger.
- You try that now, or do it again: Gesture with open hand palm up towards student after a demonstration of a skill.

== Dive light signals ==
The focused beam of a dive light can be used for basic signalling as well.

- OK signal: Drawing a circle on the ground in front of buddy.
- Attention please! Waving the torch up/down.
- emergency! Rapid, repeated, back and forth horizontal motion

Normally a diver does not shine a torch / flashlight in another diver's eyes but directs the beam to his or her own hand signal.

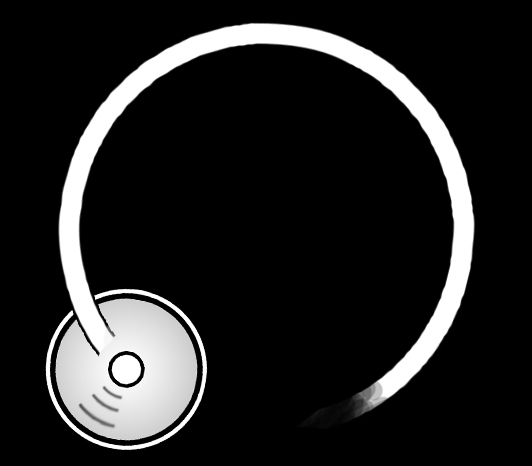
Light signal "OK"

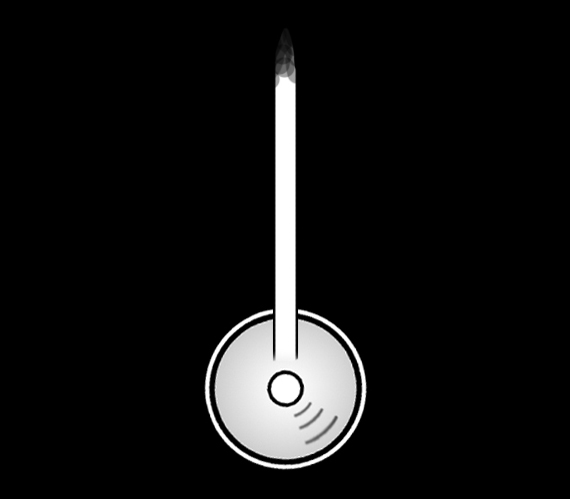
Light signal "Attention"

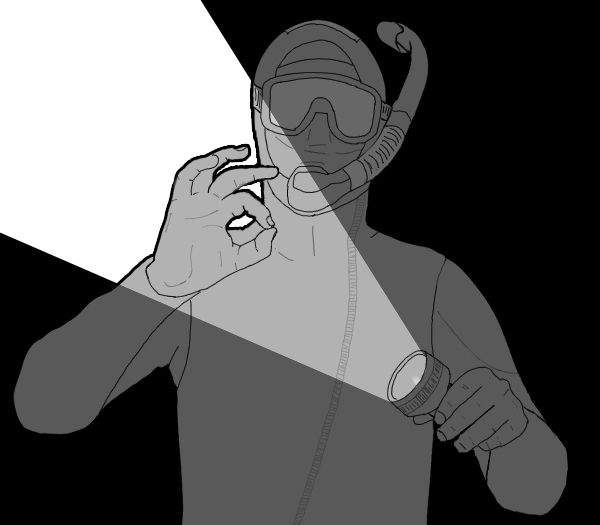
light used to illuminate hand signal

== Touch signals ==
There are a few tactile signals in use by penetration divers for controlling a blind passage through an area of extremely low visibility, or where the restrictions do not allow the divers to see each other well enough to use hand signals. The Rimbach system of touch contact signalling:

- Push forward = go,
- Pull back = back up,
- Squeeze = stop.

== Line signals ==
Also known as rope signals, these are generally used in conditions of low visibility where a diver is connected to another person, either another diver or a line tender on the surface, by a rope, airline hose or diver's umbilical. These date back to the time of the use of standard diving dress. Some of these signals, or pre-arranged variants, can be used with a surface marker buoy. The diver pulls down on the buoy line to make the buoy bob in an equivalent pattern to the rope signal. Effective line signals need a free line without much slack – before attempting a line signal, the slack must be taken up, and the line pulled firmly. Most signals are acknowledged by returning the same signal, which shows that it was received accurately. Persistent failure to acknowledge may indicate a serious problem and should be resolved as a matter of urgency. There are several systems in use, and it is necessary to have agreement between diver and tender before the dive.

=== British Sub-Aqua Club ===
BS-AC have a very small set of rope signals. Most of them have the same meaning as the equivalent commercial or Royal Navy signal.

Tender to diver

- One pull – Are you OK?
- Two pulls – Stay put.
- Three pulls – Go down.
- Four pulls – Come up at normal rate.
- Five or more pulls – Emergency, come up to the surface!

Diver to tender

- One pull – I am OK.
- Two pulls – I am stationary.
- Three pulls – I am going down.
- Four pulls – I am coming up.
- Five or more pulls – Emergency, bring me to the surface! (no reply required)

=== Public Safety Divers ===
Public safety divers and some recreational divers use the following line signals while conducting circular and arc searches underwater.

Tender to diver

- One pull – Are you OK?
- Two pulls – Stop, take out slack, reverse direction.
- Three pulls – Come to the surface.
- Four pulls – Stop, stand by, don't move. (there could be danger ahead or a boat entering the search area)

Diver to tender

- One pull on the line – OK.
- Two pulls – Pay out more line.
- Three pulls – Object found.
- Four or more pulls – Assistance needed.

=== Commercial diving ===
Rope signals used in the UK and South Africa include the following:

Signals are combinations of pulls and bells, A pull is a relatively long steady tension on the line. Bells are always given in pairs, or pairs followed by the remaining odd bell. They are short tugs, and a pair is separated by a short interval, with a longer interval to the next pair or the single bell. The technique and nomenclature derive from the customary sounding of the ships bell every half-hour during the watches, which is also performed in pairs, with the odd bell last. One bell is not used as a diving signal as it is difficult to distinguish it from a jerk caused by temporarily snagging the line.

Attendant to diver:

General signals:

- 1 pull – Calling for attention, are you OK?
- 2 pulls – I am sending down a rope's end. (or other pre-arranged item)
- 3 pulls – You have come up too far, go back down until we stop you.
- 4 pulls – Come up.
- 4 pulls and 2 bells – Come to the surface immediately. (often for surface decompression)
- 4 pulls and 5 bells – Come up your safety float line.

Direction signals:

- 1 pull – Search where you are.
- 2 bells – Go out along the jackstay or distance line, or straight out away from tender.
- 3 bells – Facing shot or tender, go right.
- 4 bells – Facing shot or tender, go left.
- 5 bells – Come back towards shot or line tender, or back along the jackstay.

Diver to attendant:

General signals:

- 1 pull – To call attention, or have completed the last instruction.
- 2 pulls – Send down a rope's end. (or other pre-arranged item)
- 3 pulls – I am going down.
- 4 pulls – I wish to come up.
- 4 pulls and 2 bells – Help me up.
- 5 or more pulls – Emergency, pull me up immediately!
- succession of 2 bells – I am fouled and need standby diver to assist.
- succession of 3 bells – I am fouled but can get clear without assistance.
- 4 pulls and 4 bells – I am trying to communicate on voice comms.

Working signals:

- 1 pull – Hold on or stop.
- 2 bells – Pull up.
- 3 bells – Lower.
- 4 bells – Take up slack on the lifeline or lifeline is too tight.
- 5 bells – I have found, started or completed the work.

=== Royal Navy ===
All signals start with a pull to attract attention, and this must be acknowledged before the actual signal is made. Royal Navy (RN) signals include short, paired "bells" and longer "pulls". The RN signals are almost identical to the rope signals used by commercial divers in the UK and South Africa.

=== US Navy ===
The US Navy also has a standard set of line signals. These include general signals from diver to tender, search signals, and emergency signals. The signal to change from general to search signals or vice versa is seven pulls, and the meaning of the signals may vary depending on whether it is given by the diver or the tender. Most signals are acknowledged by returning the same signal, confirming that the signal was received correctly.

== Slates ==
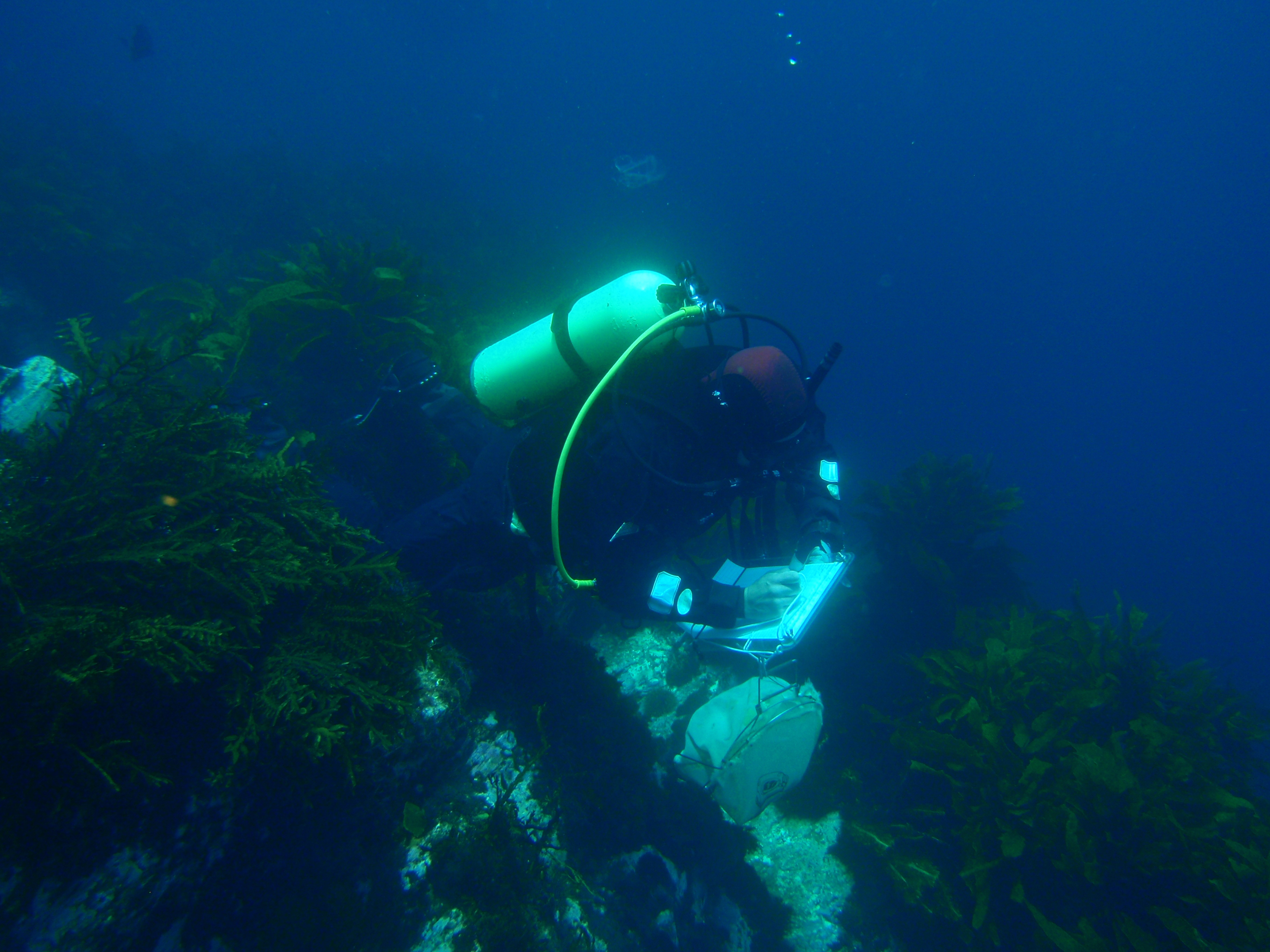
Diver recording sightings on a printed waterproof paper data sheet on a clipboard

Written messages on plastic slates can be used to convey complex messages with a low risk of misunderstanding. Slates are available in various sizes and are usually hard white plastic with a matte finish, suitable for writing on with a pencil. They can be stored in various ways, but in a pocket or bungeed to the wrist are popular methods. Clipped to the diver by a lanyard is another method, but there is a greater risk of entanglement. Slates may be used to record information to be used on the dive, such as decompression schedules, to discuss matters of importance for which hand signals are not sufficient, and to record data collected during the dive. Waterproof paper wet-notes are a compact equivalent, and pre-printed waterproof data-sheets and clip-board are routinely used by scientific divers for recording observations.

== Cave line markers ==
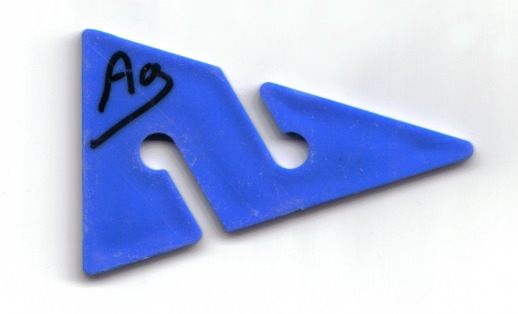
Line Arrow Marker

Cave diving line markers (Arrow directional marker, personal non-directional "cookie" marker, and personal hybrid "referencing exit marker") securely attached to line

Cave arrows, Line arrows or Dorff markers (after Lewis Holtzendorff) are plastic arrowhead markers which are hooked onto a cave line by wrapping the line around the arrow through the slots. They are used to indicate the direction to the exit, and can be identified by feel. The message is simple, but of critical importance, as if a diver does not know which way to go at a line junction there is a risk of serious trouble. Line arrows are also used at a junction on the permanent line, and at a tie-off, so when the diver gets back to the tie-off, he or she can identify which way to turn.

Non-directional and hybrid personal line markers are used to indicate the identity of a diver who has passed along the line and has not yet returned to that point. They are attached to the line in the same way as cave arrows, and are deployed on the way into the cave, usually at critical points such as forks or jumps, and are used to indicate to other divers that someone is further in along the line. They are marked to identify the diver, and are recovered by the diver on the way out. Cookies (round markers), rectangular referencing exit markers and clothes pegs are used for this purpose. The round and rectangular markers are attached to the line in the same way as arrows, and may be personalised in any way that the owners can easily recognise. Colour is often used, but as there are a limited number of standard colours available, and they are often poorly distinguishable in the dark, modifications to shape may be used which can be recognised by touch.

Arrows should always be placed on the outbound side of an intersection as this is unambiguous. Sometimes there is more than one exit from an intersection. Both should be marked with arrows, but the preferred exit can be marked with two arrows in series. The arrows always point in the direction along the line towards an exit.

== Light and gas signals for surface supplied dives ==
There are emergency signals usually associated with wet and closed bell diving by which the surface and bellman can exchange a limited amount of information which may be critical to the safety of the divers. They are for use when the voice communications system fails, and provide enough information that the bell can be recovered with minimal risk to the divers. These signals are not generally applicable to a diver who is supplied directly by umbilical from the surface, but if the umbilical is snagged and rope signals cannot be transmitted, these signals may be provided by hat light flashes and helmet flush (blowing gas from the helmet in a continuous stream by opening the free-flow valve or pressing the purge button).

- Two light flashes at the bell means that the surface is not receiving voice communications from the bell. The bellman responds by blowing down bell gas twice, creating two large distinct eruptions of bubbles that will be seen at the surface, then recalls the diver and prepares for surfacing.
- When the bell is ready to surface and the voice communications are not functioning, the bellman will blow down bell gas four times.
- If there is a problem during the ascent, a long continuous blow-down is the signal to stop.

== Miscellaneous emergency signals ==
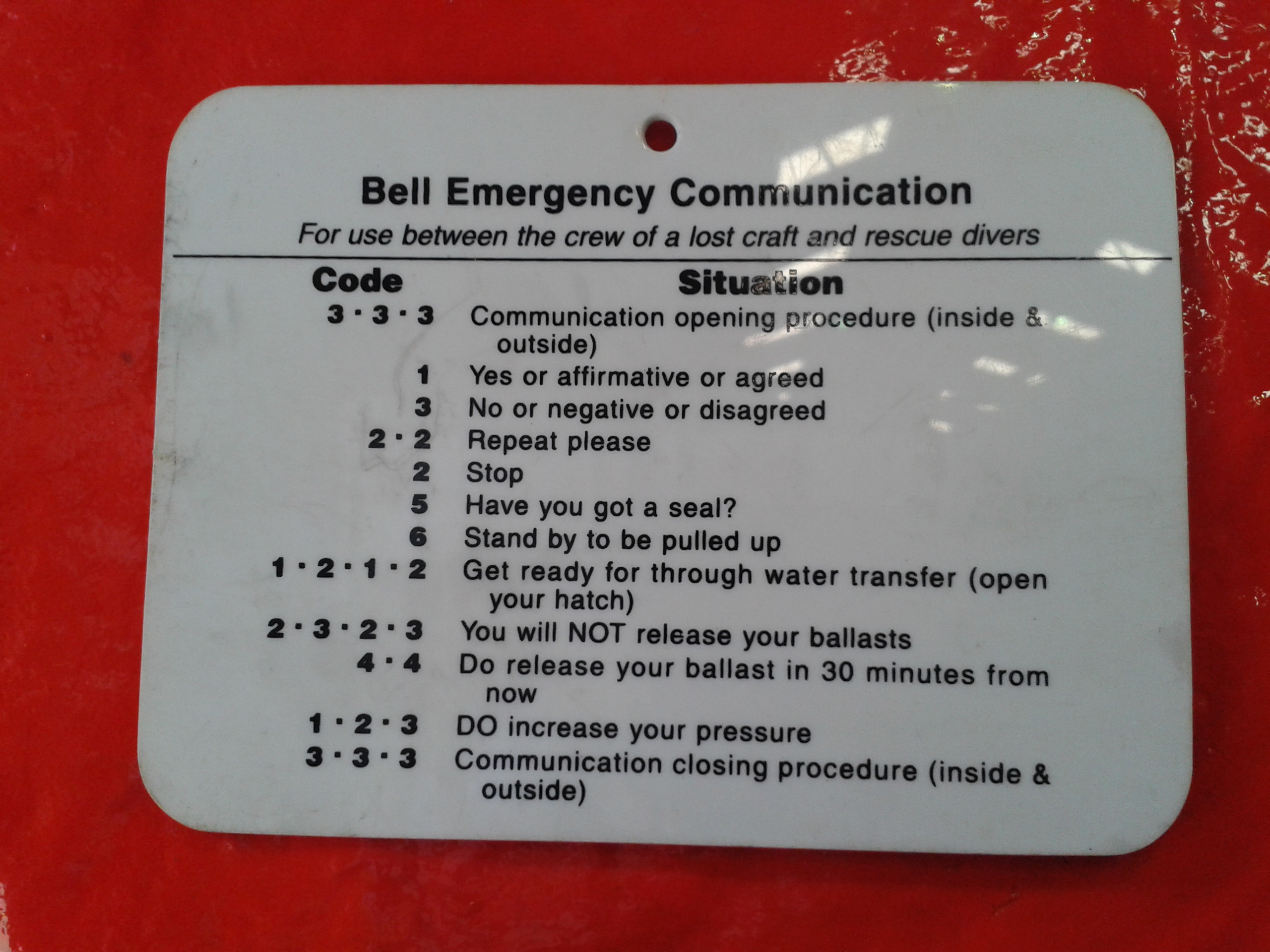
A list of tap codes may be fixed to the interior and exterior of a closed bell to ensure mutually understandable communication.

Tap codes, made by knocking on the hull, are used to communicate with divers trapped in a sealed bell or the occupants of a submersible or submarine during a rescue.

A scuba diver who deploys a Delayed Surface Marker Buoy (DSMB) at the end of a dive may use a pre-arranged colour code to indicate to the surface support crew if there is a problem for which assistance is required. In some circles a yellow DSMB is considered an emergency signal, and red means OK. In most circles a second DSMB deployed on the same line will indicate a problem. A DSMB can also be used to carry up a slate with a message, but this is unlikely to be noticed unless a special arrangement has been made.

Other minor emergency signals include the use of mirrors, inflatable signal tubes, floating streamers, compressed air sirens, whistles and other noisemakers to alert the surface support personnel of a problem.

VHF radios and personal emergency locator beacons are available which can transmit a distress signal to nearby vessels and are pressure resistant to recreational diving depths, so they can be carried by a diver and activated at the surface if out of sight of the boat.

== Diver down signals ==
=== Flags ===
"Diver down" flags

The international code flag "Alpha", meaning: "I have a diver down; keep well clear at slow speed"

Alternative 'Diver down' flag in common use in the United States, Italy, and Canada

A diver down flag, or scuba flag, is a flag used on the water to indicate that there is a diver below. Two styles of flag are in use. Internationally, the code flag "alpha", which has a white hoist and blue swallowtail fly, is used to signal that the vessel has a diver down and other vessels should keep well clear at slow speed. In North America a red flag with a white diagonal stripe from the upper left corner to the lower right corner is customarily used. The purpose of these flags is to notify other boats to steer clear for the safety of the divers and to avert the possibility of a collision with the dive boat which may be unable to maneuver out of the way.

=== Light and shape signals ===
Light and shape signals

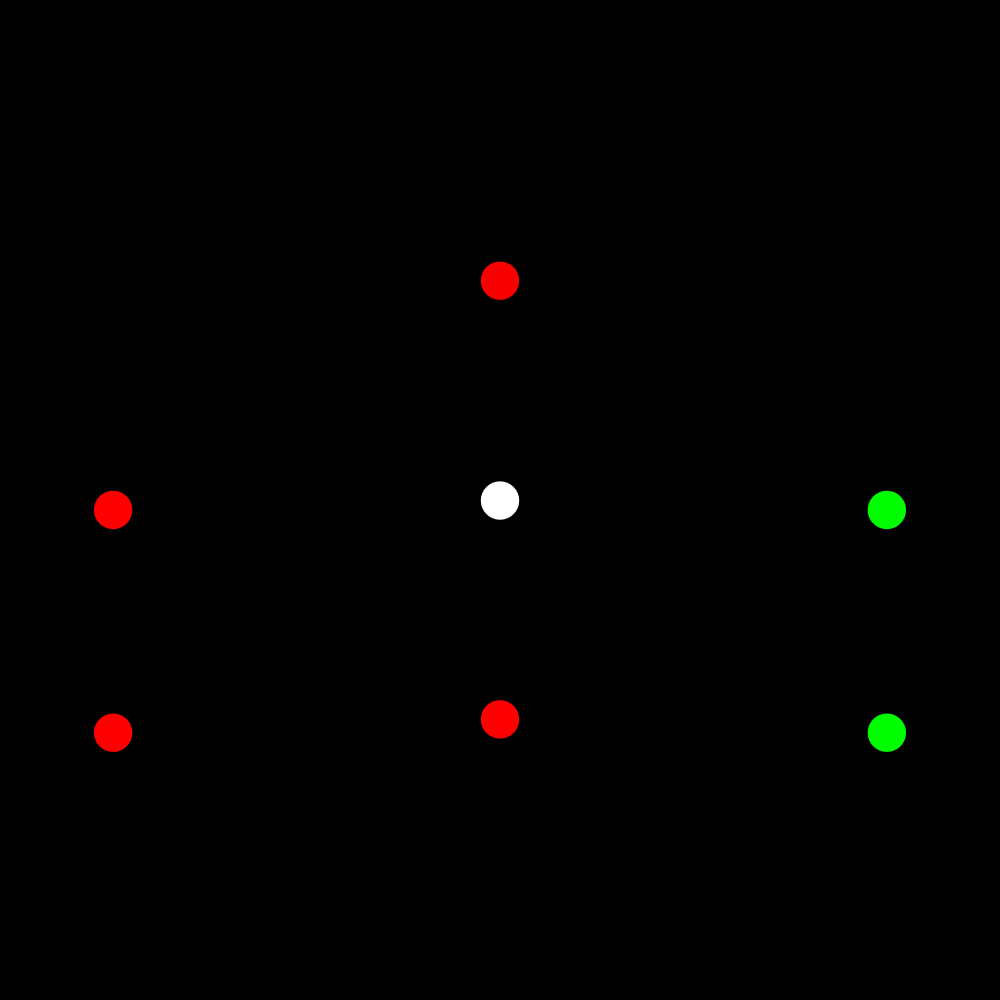
Light signals for a vessel undertaking underwater operations at night. The red lights indicate the obstructed side, green lights indicate clear side.

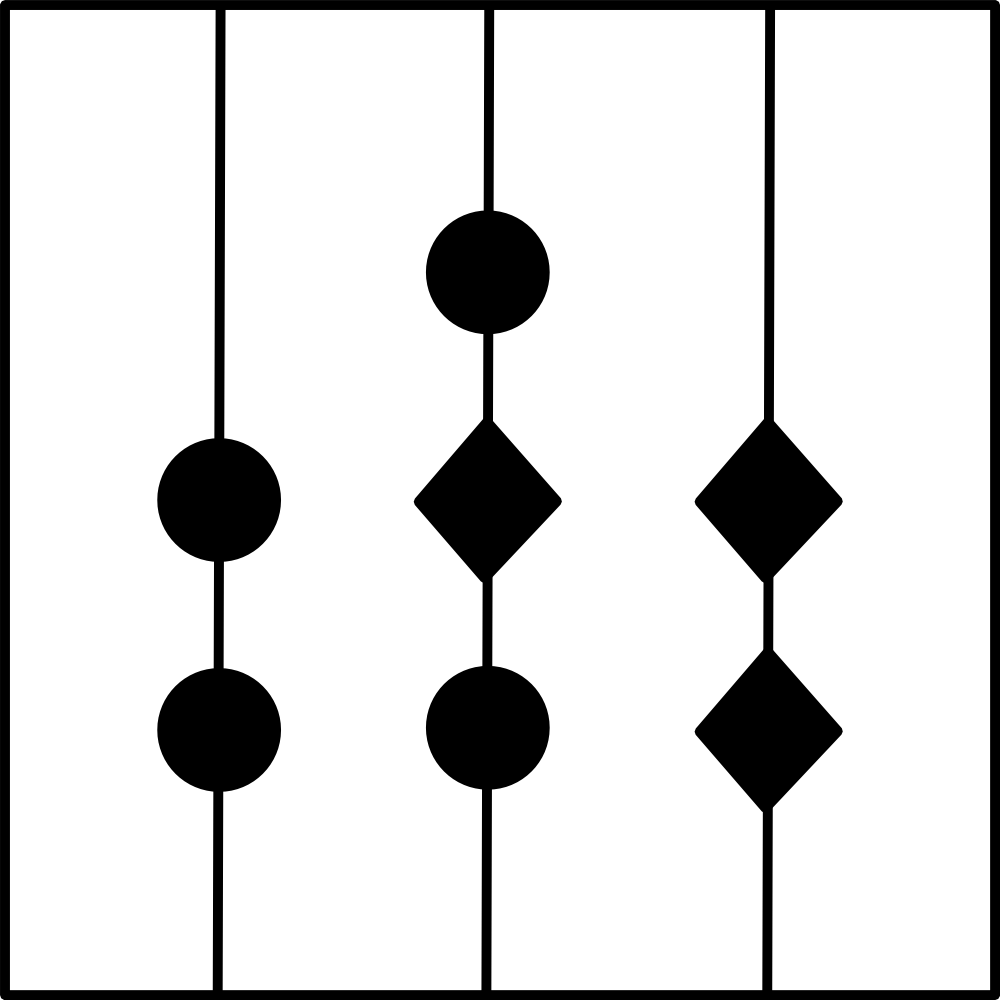
Shape signals for a vessel undertaking underwater operations during daylight. The balls indicate the obstructed side, diamonds indicate clear side.

A vessel supporting a diving operation may be unable to take avoiding action to prevent a collision, as it may be physically connected to divers in the water by lifelines or umbilicals, or may be maneuvering in the close proximity to divers, and is required to indicate this constraint by international maritime law, using the prescribed light and shape signals, and other vessels are obliged to keep clear, both for the safety of the divers, and to prevent collision with the diving support vessel. These signals and the rules for responding to them are specified in Rule 27 of the International Regulations for Preventing Collisions at Sea, also known as COLREGS, and "Rules of the Road", as quoted below.

A vessel restricted in her ability to manoeuvre, except a vessel engaged in mine-clearance operations, shall exhibit:

1. three all-round lights in a vertical line where they can best be seen. The highest and lowest of these lights shall be red and the middle light shall be white;
2. three day shapes in a vertical line where they can best be seen. The highest and lowest of these shapes shall be balls and the middle one a diamond;
3. when making way through the water, a masthead light or lights, sidelights and a stern light, in addition to the lights prescribed in sub-paragraph 1;
4. when at anchor, in addition to the lights or shapes prescribed in sub-paragraphs 1 and 2, the light, lights or shape prescribed in Rule 30.

A vessel engaged in dredging or underwater operations, when restricted in her ability to manoeuvre, shall exhibit the lights and shapes prescribed in sub-paragraphs (1, 2 and 3 above) of this Rule and shall in addition, when an obstruction exists, exhibit:

1. two all-round red lights or two balls in a vertical line to indicate the side on which the obstruction exists;
2. two all-round green lights or two diamonds in a vertical line to indicate the side on which another vessel may pass;
3. when at anchor, the lights or shapes prescribed in this paragraph instead of the lights or shape prescribed in Rule 30.

Whenever the size of a vessel engaged in diving operations makes it impracticable to exhibit all lights and shapes prescribed in paragraph (above) of this Rule, the following shall be exhibited:

1. three all-round lights in a vertical line where they can best be seen. The highest and lowest of these lights shall be red and the middle light shall be white;
2. a rigid replica of the International Code flag "A" not less than 1 metre (3.3 ft) in height. Measures shall be taken to ensure its all-round visibility.

=== Surface marker buoys ===
Permanently buoyant or inflatable surface marker buoys may be used to identify and/or mark the presence of a diver below. These may be moored, as a shotline, and indicate the general area with divers, or tethered to one of the divers by a line, indicating the location of the group to people at the surface. This type of buoy is usually brightly coloured for visibility, and may be fitted with one of the diving flag signals. A surface marker buoy (SMB) tethered to a diver is usually towed on a thin line attached to a reel, spool or other device which allows the diver to control the line length to suit the depth, so that excessive slack line can be avoided.

A deployable, or delayed surface marker buoy (DSMB) is an inflatable marker which the diver inflates while underwater and sends up at the end of a line to indicate position, and usually either that he or she is ascending, or that there is a problem. The use of a DSMB is common when divers expect to do decompression stops away from a fixed reference, or will be surfacing in an area with boat traffic, or need to indicate their position to the dive boat or surface team. Divers can carry two differently coloured DSMBs so that they can signal to their surface support for help while decompressing underwater. By one system, a red buoy indicates normal decompression and a yellow buoy indicates a problem, such as shortage of gas, that the surface support should investigate and resolve. In other circles, two buoys of any colour on one line means the same.

A group of moored surface marker buoys may be used to demarcate an area in which diving is taking place. This is more likely to be used by commercial, scientific or public service divers to cordon off a work or search area, or an accident or crime scene.

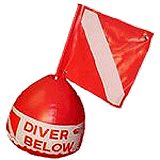
Inflatable surface marker buoy marked with diving flag

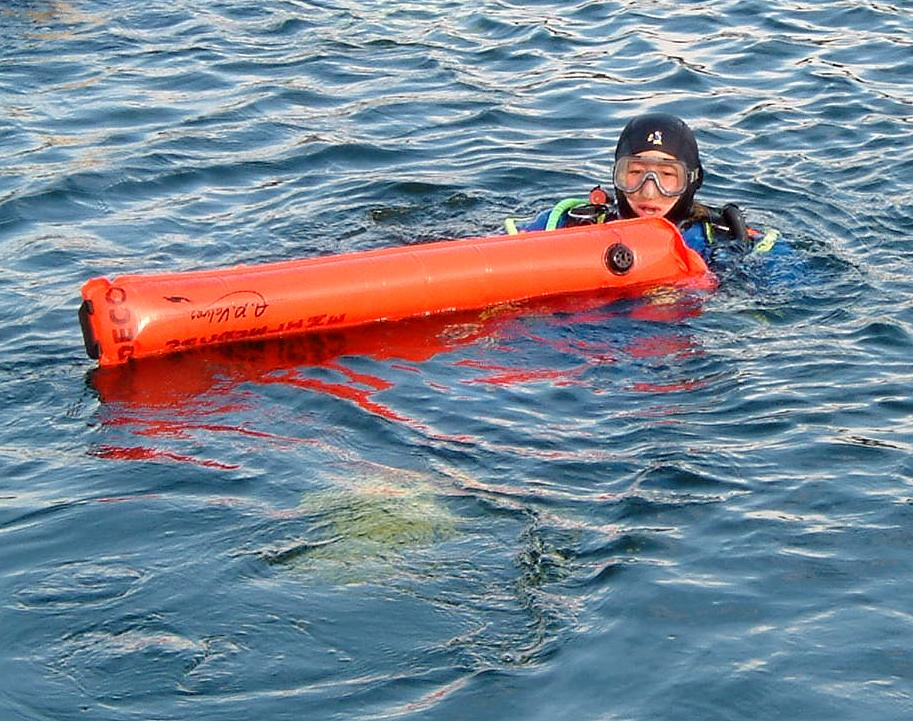
Delayed surface marker buoy with diver at the surface

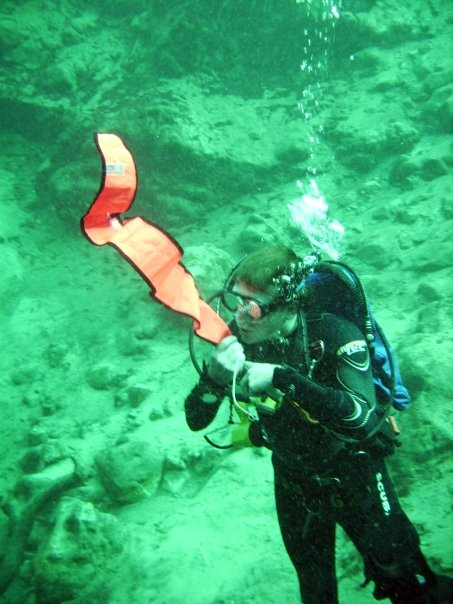
A diver preparing to inflate a delayed surface marker buoy

== Ultrasonic wearables ==
The Buddy-Watcher is a wrist mounted buddy alert device which sends an ultrasonic signal when a key is pressed, for at least 20 metres (66 ft) through the water to the matching unit on the dive buddy, which will produce a silent vibratory and visual signal alerting the diver that their buddy wants attention. There is no direct indication to the sender whether the signal has been received and no indication of distance or direction to the buddy. The device is waterproof to 40 metres (130 ft), and therefore is suited for recreational scuba diving use, but not technical diving.

The UDI-28 and UDI-14 wrist mounted decompression computers have a communications feature between wrist units and a surface unit which includes distress signals, a limited set of text messages and a homing signal

== Underwater messaging using smartphones and smartwatches ==
In 2022, University of Washington, developed a software app, AquaApp, for mobile devices that repurposes the microphones and speakers on existing smartphones and watches to enable underwater acoustic communication between divers. The software running on commodity Android smartphones placed in water-proof cases, supports sending one of 240 pre-set messages including SoS beacons and has a range of up to 100 metres.
