= Children in scuba diving =

Participation of minors in recreational activity

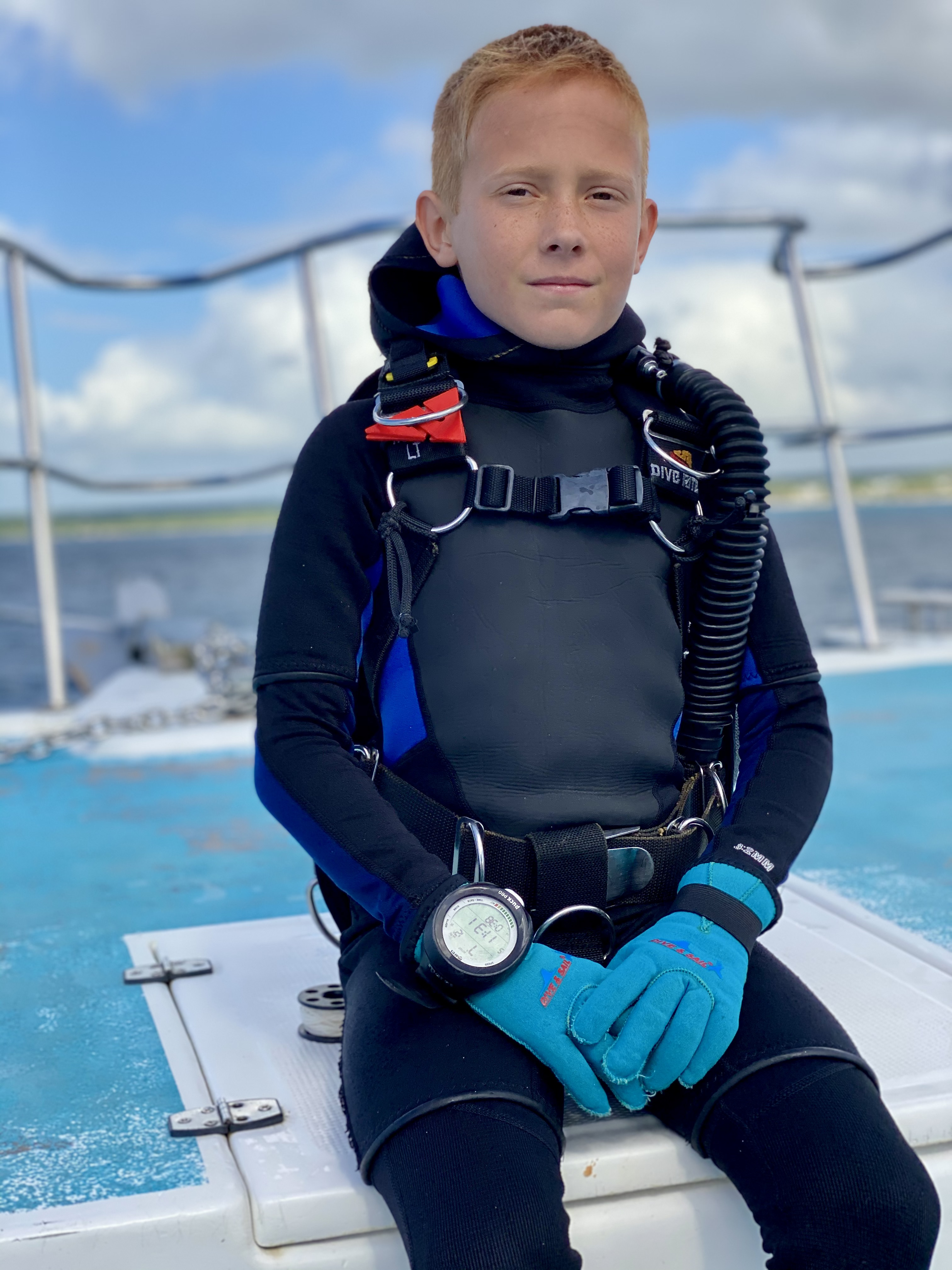
Young person wearing scuba diving equipment, travelling on a dive boat

Children have been participating in recreational scuba diving since the pioneering years when training was handed down by the practitioners. (Note: Cousteau and Gagnan had developed the scuba regulator by 1945, and by 1960 several training agencies had been established. Cousteau introduced his sons to scuba in about 1945) There were no training standards, no certified or licensed instructors, and no formal training materials. The results were generally acceptable, and safety was not a major concern. Children tended to be trained by skilled parents, who were competent at the requisite diving skills, knew their own children, were experienced in bringing them up, and accepted responsibility for their actions.

Diver training organisations later took over the instruction and certification of divers, but until 1987 there were no broadly recognised minimum age standards for scuba diving, and certification depended only on satisfying the performance standards.

The Confédération Mondiale des Activités Subaquatiques (CMAS) had standards for training from 8 years old with a good safety record. In 2000, after reviewing the industry-wide safety records, the US Recreational Scuba Training Council (RSTC) returned to its pre-1987 performance-based standard. It again accepts people younger than 15 to learn to dive and to dive under adult supervision, with a minimum age of 10 years for Junior Scuba Diver with professional supervision and Junior Open Water Diver with parental supervision, to a maximum depth of 12 metres (39 ft). Younger participants can take part in Professional Association of Diving Instructors (PADI) Seal Team and Bubble-maker events under professional supervision in confined water only.

== History ==
Jacques Cousteau, Lloyd Bridges, and others from the pioneering years of recreational scuba diving, introduced their own children to scuba diving, usually with satisfactory results.

Since training agencies took over the training and certification of divers, for-profit agencies have tended to gradually reduce the minimum ages based on their recorded experience as that increases the market size, whereas not for profit training agencies appear to have a more conservative and cautious approach. Overall, the age at which children have been allowed to start scuba training has decreased, as the training agencies made courses available specifically targeting children. Official recommendations from specialist medical groups generally tend to be precautionary and conservative in the absence of data from targeted studies.

PADI reduced its minimum age from 12 to 10 years based on 30 years of data from their own experience and from other training agencies. CMAS has a junior programme stating at 8 years old, and American agencies start at ages from 8 to 12.

== Safety record ==
Not many safety statistics are available, but there is also no history of a high accident rate during training. Although there are few cases of severe injury or death following scuba incidents involving children, the number of child divers, how often they dive, and the dive profiles used are also not reported.

=== Policy ===
Little scientific evidence is available regarding a minimum age limit for scuba diving. In 1999 the South Pacific Underwater Medicine Society (SPUMS) Committee on Medical Standards for Recreational Diving recommended a minimum age of 16 years based on factors relating to diver safety. The more recent 2010 SPUMS guidance suggests a minimum age of 14 years based on an opinion that children below that age do not have the emotional maturity to safely deal with diving emergencies.

In 2003 the Dutch Society of Diving and Hyperbaric Medicine (DSDHM) issued a national guideline specifying a minimum age of 14 years for scuba diving, but it is recognised that younger children also dive and it is in their interests to be examined and assessed by diving physicians for fitness to dive. The DSDHM set up a task group to review the available literature on the topic and provide updated guidelines, which were officially accepted by the DSDHM in around 2020.

There are differences in agency policy on professionally supervised introductory experience compared with training for actual certification, and differences between the policies of the various agencies.

Following standard industry practice, legal responsibility of the instructor and the training agency is limited as far as possible by waivers, with parents and legal guardians assuming responsibility where the minor cannot. The text of the waiver is likely to mention the hazards and possible consequences, and thereby serves to demonstrate that the client was made aware of the risks. Further protection is by adherence to standards, keeping adequate records and sufficient liability insurance cover.

== Risk ==
There are always risks in scuba diving, including risks of death and permanent disablement, but there are also risks associated with many other necessary and desirable activities. Most of the risks associated with scuba diving are relevant to all ages, but some hazards may be more of a risk to younger divers. Existing guidelines and recommendations for adults do not necessarily transfer adequately to children, and scientific evidence in this regard is generally lacking.

Younger divers may be at greater risk because of variations in physical, physiological and psychological factors linked to age. Acceptance of risk for a minor has legal and ethical aspects. A parent or guardian may legally accept risk for a minor, but ethically, they should have an adequate understanding of the risk, which raises the question of if and how the diving instructor and school ensure that this understanding is in place.

== Medical concerns ==
Not much data has been published about medical aspects of exposure of children to the stressors of diving; consequently a large part of the criticism is based on hypotheses and speculation. These concerns should be considered in the context of potential benefits to the children of learning to rationally evaluate risk.

Factors influencing fitness to dive for adults are equally relevant to younger people, but there are some factors that are more relevant to bodies that are still growing. Some of these characteristics change gradually with age along a continuum, and adult characteristics are reached at different ages in different individuals, making it difficult to make valid generalisations.

=== Physical differences ===
- Stature and strength affect the ability to carry heavy objects like scuba sets, and how well and comfortably they fit on the diver.
- Motor skills: Coordination and dexterity and in some cases, physical strength, affect the effectiveness and efficiency of skill performance, which influences safety, where the immediate and effective performance of a procedure can be critical.
- Thermal concerns: Heat loss and insulation are influenced by physical bulk, ratio of surface area to mass, and thickness of the subcutaneous fat layer, as well as effective insulating clothing.

=== Physiological differences ===
- Bone growth — It has been suggested that the articular cartilage in adolescents and children may be vulnerable to gas micro-embolism, but there is no evidence available either way.
- Equalization – In young children the Eustachian tubes are relatively narrow and more horizontal, with softer cartilage. The ability to equalise the middle ear is known to be reduced before the age of eight, and children are more susceptible to ear disorders than adults. Middle ear squeeze is the most common dive medical problem in young divers. A careful assessment of ear health by the medical examiner can reduce risk of injury.
- Small and slender people have an increased rate of heat loss due to body surface area to weight ratio, which increases the hypothermia risk.

=== Pathophysiological differences ===
Patent foramen ovale (PFO) is more likely to persist in children. The rate of occurrence is estimated at around 40%. In adults with PFA, the risk of cerebral ischaemia is higher, so it has been assumed that the risk in children is proportionately higher. A shallower maximum depth has been suggested to reduce the risk of microbubble formation.

Bone development. Although there has been concern voiced about decompression stress affecting long bone development in children, there is no evidence showing that there is a problem. The epiphyseal plates close in late adolescence and there have been large enough numbers of teenagers diving that growth inhibition due to decompression sickness would be apparent, but there are no cases reported. Hyperbaric oxygen treatment is not known to have deleterious effects on healthy bone of any age.

Lung development. The lungs develop rapidly before the age of eight, at which stage the number of alveoli reaches its maximum but the lungs are still relatively small, so the diameter of the airways is also small, requiring greater breathing effort and resulting in more airway restriction at the end of exhalation than in adults. Until about 16, a child's alveoli and bronchioles are smaller than an adult's and can collapse at a relatively large pulmonary closing volume. (Note: The lung volume at which the smaller airways start to collapse during exhalation.) They are theoretically more vulnerable to air trapping in the airways and at higher risk of pulmonary barotrauma. The developing lung can also be more sensitive to stimuli like cold dry air that cause bronchoconstriction.

=== Psychological differences ===
- Executive dysfunction is more prevalent in children who have been diagnosed with attention deficit hyperactivity disorder (ADHD), attention deficit disorder (ADD), autism or dyslexia. The deficit in attention and focus could adversely affect situation awareness and timely and appropriate response to adverse events, which may deteriorate into emergencies. These attributes can constitute a relative contraindication to diving.
- A child may lack emotional maturity and the ability to objectively assess risks.
- An analysis of DAN emergency call records suggested that psychological immaturity, poor management of adverse events and inadequate supervision may have led to panic and severe injuries among minor divers. The most common injuries were to the ears and sinuses, but 15% of dive-related injuries in minors had a final diagnosis of pulmonary barotrauma.
- Impetuosity

== Learning differences ==
Adult learners are expected to be self-motivated and behave responsibly in a voluntary learning environment, and if they are not, it is their choice. This is not always the case with children, and the duty of care from an instructor is consequently different. A higher level of cooperation and communication is needed between instructor, parent, and child learner to ensure that necessary learning occurs, and that it occurs reasonably efficiently.

=== How children learn at various stages and ages ===
The cognitive processes that help to regulate, control and manage thoughts and actions, also known as executive functioning, is only fully developed in the late teens.

Situations where routine behavioural response is not normally adequate include: planning or decision-making; error-correction; responding to novel difficult and dangerous situations; and situations that require overcoming habitual responses.

Some factors to be considered when evaluating suitability of a minor for scuba diver training include:

- How effectively is the person likely to handle any given problem.
- Can the person understand level of risk, possible and likely consequences of an associated incident, and can they make a rational informed acceptance of that risk
- Are they able to assess a developing risk during a dive and reasonably mitigate it by adjusting the dive profile in time to avoid escalation.

== Preparation for diving training ==
- Swimming: For safety and developing comfort and confidence in the water.
- Foundational learning: Reading, mathematics, physics, physiology of diving.
- Physical fitness. Strength and endurance as appropriate and necessary.

== Readiness for diver training ==
Medical fitness to dive should be assessed by a competent person. While there are several issues that may be recognised by an outsider as reasons not to dive, the ability to certify medical fitness of another person requires actual assessed competence.

Physical readiness has two aspects. Physical capacity to manage the available equipment – an ergonomic consideration impacting on safety, and the existence of the prerequisite skills, like the ability to swim, and the co-ordination to perform critical safety skills correctly and reliably.

=== Medical fitness to dive ===
The DSDHM expressed a concern that parental pressure on children to dive could influence the medical declaration as commonly used by training agencies, and recommends a professional medical examination, as a more reliable and unbiased alternative.

=== Capacity to manage equipment and procedures ===
Leaving aside the issue of whether a young person of small physique can plausibly be considered a buddy to an adult of ordinary size for safety purposes, there is the more immediate issue of whether they can manage themself safely as a diver.

Age can be seen as an oversimplified and inaccurate proxy for actual physical and psychological readiness for diver training. This is complicated by the very small number of people who both understand the actual requirements of diving, and are competent to assess the readiness of the specific child. This is not training that is provided by the instructor certifying agency, and there are no specialist certifications as diving instructors for minors.

Some children are physically large and strong enough to manage the equipment, emotionally and intellectually mature enough to behave safely and responsibly and learn, understand, remember and correctly apply the knowledge and skills. Others may fall short on one or more aspects even when technically at an age where they are eligible for full certification.

Three stages from Piaget's theory of cognitive development, are relevant:

- Preoperational stage. from about 2 to 7 years old. This stage is too early for sufficient understanding of cause and effect.
- Concrete operational stage. Usually between approximately seven to 11 years.
- Formal operational stage, usually starting from about 11 years and reaching full development at about 15 years.

Developmental readiness. Divers must be able to remain calm and solve problems underwater.

Parental pressure. Excessive enthusiasm from parents can put undue pressure on the child and may adversely affect their decision to dive. Diving physicians and instructors may have a more objective position and ability to assess whether the child is genuinely interested and physically and psychologically ready, or whether there are family pressures involved.

== Instructor qualifications ==
There is no recreational diving instructor specialty for training children, but some experience or training as a child educator is valuable. Divers Alert Network have recommend additional specialised training for teaching and guiding minors, which should focus on the general and individual needs and behavioural characteristics of children that make them more vulnerable to some incidents that may cause injury.

== Buddy system and supervision ==
Buddy diving is the use of the buddy system by scuba divers. It is a set of safety procedures intended to improve the chances of avoiding or surviving accidents in or under water by having divers dive in a group of two or sometimes three. When using the buddy system, members of the buddy group dive together and co-operate with each other, so that they can help or rescue each other in the event of an emergency. This is most effective if both divers are competent in all relevant skills and sufficiently aware of the situation that they can respond in time, which is a matter of both attitude and competence.

When there is a large disparity in physical size and strength the capacity to effectively function as a buddy pair is open to question.

Given the emphasis on the requirement that all buddy divers be able to aid their buddy in an emergency, over the last decade there have been some agency-approved diving practices established where certain types of buddies do not actually meet this criterion. This is evident in the practice of scuba diving for children. Initiated by PADI, in an effort to expand scuba diving into the realm of becoming a “family activity” like skiing, the certification of children has been adopted by other recreational diving agencies with their own diving programmes for children (RSTC minimum age for certification is 15 years). These typically include two levels, depending on the child's age. PADI has six courses/levels for children, in which a child from the age of 10 can become a buddy diver in open water situations. The other buddy in this team can be a certified parent or a dive professional. Serious concerns have been expressed about this general policy of having child buddies, among the concerns is the mental anguish and psychological damage that may be caused to a child who fails to rescue a buddy parent. The first child buddy death in British waters occurred in 2008. The first double fatality of a buddy pair in which one diver was a minor occurred with a British father and son in Gozo in 2006. Proponents of dive training for children point to the great enjoyment and sense of wonderment the children feel when introduced to the underwater world and point out that other family sporting activities also have unfortunate incidents of serious injury to children.

Supervision: South Pacific Underwater Medicine Society (SPUMS) recommends always having at least two adult certified divers to dive in open water with young divers. A DAN report on diving accidents to minors recommends that there should be a fit and competent certified adult diver within arms reach to monitor the minor, particularly for evidence of discomfort, until it is clear that the minor responds appropriately to stress.

For open-water dives, diving minors may not be reliable dive buddies, and may respond unpredictably to threats, which could endanger both divers. A buddy system of two adults and a child would be more resilient, preferably where one of the adults knows the minor well enough to identify subtle indicators of discomfort or stress. Such supervision should reasonably mitigate most risk and prevent serious injury.

== Fit and sizing of equipment ==
- The availability of correctly fitting diving equipment - diving suits, buoyancy compensators, masks, fins, regulator mouthpieces etc. may be limited. Wet suits can be customised, but will not fit acceptably for long, and will have to be modified or replaced when the fit is no longer acceptable. Heat loss in small people is already a problem, and is exacebated by poorly fitting suits. It is a bigger problem in cold water.
- Growth and replacement of equipment. Rapidly growing children need replacement equipment frequently, with associated high costs.
- Gas matching and emergency gas supply sharing. If the child is expected to perform as an effective dive buddy, they will need to carry sufficient reserve gas to supply a buddy in an emergency, as well as to finish the dive themself.

Ergonomics - Equipment must fit well enough to work correctly without discomfort. The number of choices is smaller than for adults because the market is much smaller in small sizes.

- BCDs must be of a suitable size. Too much volume available for buoyancy makes them difficult to control and potentially unstable, which can expose the user to a high risk of uncontrolled ascent. The harness must be sufficiently adjustable to keep the unit in the correct position for stable trim.
- Low profile and low volume masks are easier to clear when they flood, but do not fit well on all face shapes and sizes. The available range of good quality masks is smaller in children's sizes.
- The dead space in a snorkel should be in proportion to the lung volume of the user, to prevent carbon dioxide buildup if dead space is too large, and excessive work of breathing if the bore is too small. The snorkel internal volume should not exceed 150ml for children, but for adults, it can be up to 230 ml. A snorkel that is too large is also more difficult to clear.
- Fins with small or soft blades will help prevent leg cramps, but need to give sufficient propulsion.
- A small person with little subcutaneous fat will lose heat faster for the same water temperature and exposure time, so a wet suit needs to have a close, but not excessively tight fit and a sufficient thickness. Suit thickness will be proportionally larger and the suit proportionally bulkier than on a larger person. A loose fit significantly reduces suit effectiveness as an insulator, and a tight suit can hinder breathing and comfort, so suits may have to be replaced quite frequently, though to some extent tailoring can help resize a suit within limits.
- Lightweight demand valves, with shorter low pressure hoses and smaller mouthpieces and bite grips may be desirable.
- Small, lightweight cylinders are preferable, and generally are available for purchase, though seldom for rental. They can be repurposed when a larger set is needed.
- The weight system is relatively simple, as the belt is adjustable and can easily be trimmed, but there may be problems with a belt slipping over smaller hips, so an integrated weight system may be useful.

== Examples of current practice ==
Professional Association of Diving Instructors (PADI) provides full certification from 15 years. The Bubbleblower programme is available from 8 years but there is no certification and depth is limited to 2m. Seal Team is also limited to minimum 8 years but adds photography and other activities. Junior Open Water Diver from 10 to 14 years provides full training of Open Water Diver, but from 10 to 11 years old must dive with a PADI professional or parent in open water with a 12m depth limitation. From 12 to 14 years they must dive with an adult but can go to 21m. After Junior Open Water they can do Advanced Junior Open Water diver, which requires one "deep dive" to more than 18m, and four additional "adventure dives" chosen from what is offered at the school.

Scuba Diving International (SDI) offers Future Buddies for age 8 to 12, who are comfortable in the water with "adequate swimming skills", as an introduction to scuba diving in a controlled environment.

Confédération Mondiale des Activités Subaquatiques (CMAS) provides training for children by instructors that are specifically certified in the training of children, and training programmes that differ from adult diver training. Minimum and maximum ages for participation of learners in the children's programmes are at the discretion of the member federations, but CMAS recommends between 8 and 14 years, with older trainees joining the adult programme. The medical certificate of fitness to dive must be signed by a doctor who is experienced in the issues of diving by children. The medical certificate should be updated every six months up to 12 years, and yearly thereafter, and the child must be able to swim at least 25 metres.

National Association of Underwater Instructors remain with a minimum age of 12 years

The South Pacific Underwater Medicine Society recommends 16 years as a minimum age for certification.

Standards Australia specifies a minimum age of 14 years.

Recreational Scuba Training Council specifies a minimum age of 15 years for recreational diver certification.

DAN Southern Africa recommend individual evaluation for each child regarding emotional and psychological development, and medical clearance by a diving medical practitioner familiar with the issues. They also recommend training by an instructor with experience training children.

== Legal constraints ==
In South Africa there are no legal restrictions on the age of recreational divers. Commercial diver registration is only available for persons of 18 years or older who have been assessed as competent by a registered commercial diving school and have a current certificate of fitness to dive.

The parents or legal guardians have a duty of care to the child and are expected to make decisions affecting their safety based on correct information and sufficient understanding of potential risk. When they do not have appropriate knowledge and experience, consulting an appropriate professional may constitute due diligence.

Dive schools involved in training minors will usually have code of conduct covering behaviour of staff during interactions.
