= Recreational diving =

Diving for the purpose of leisure and enjoyment

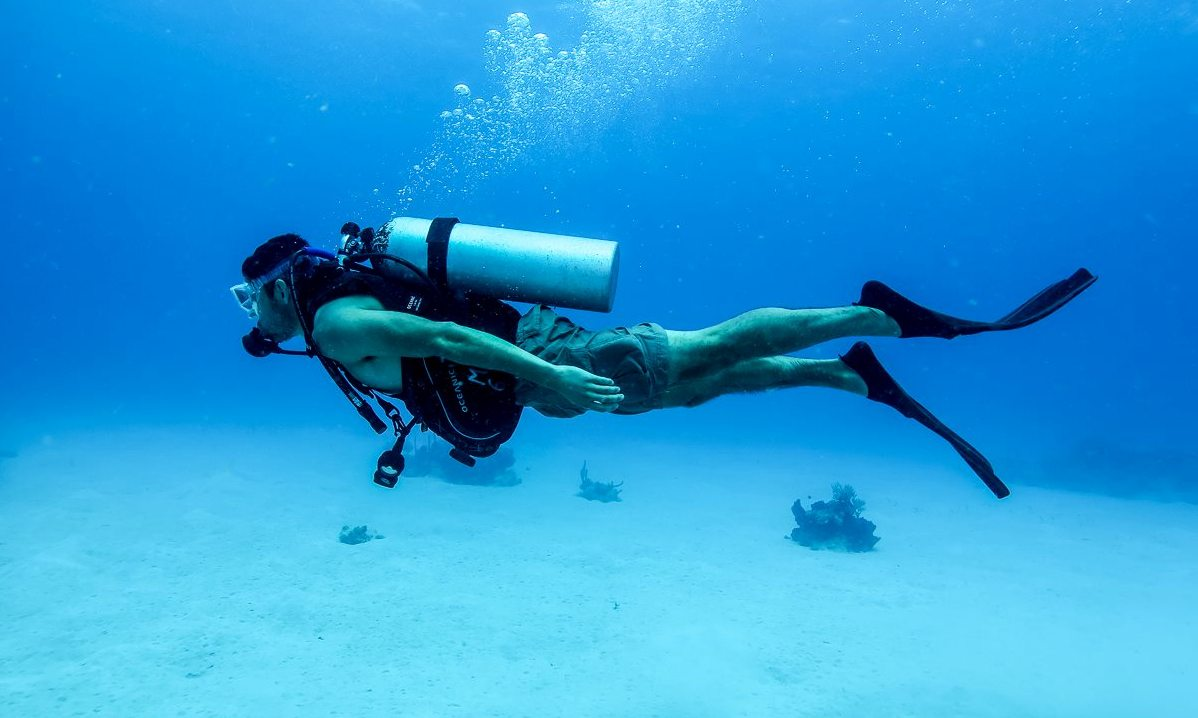
Beginner diver in St. Croix, United States Virgin Islands

Recreational diving or sport diving is diving for the purpose of leisure and enjoyment, usually when using scuba equipment. The term "recreational diving" may also be used in contradistinction to "technical diving", a more demanding aspect of recreational diving which requires more training and experience to develop the competence to reliably manage more complex equipment in the more hazardous conditions associated with the disciplines. (Note: The distinction between "recreational diving" and "technical diving" is not clearly and universally defined, but most major diving training agencies recognise a range of activities which they class as recreational diving and others which they class as technical diving. (see for example, PADI and DSAT, and SDI and TDI).) Breath-hold diving for recreation also fits into the broader scope of the term, but this article covers the commonly used meaning of "scuba diving" for recreational purposes, where the diver is not constrained from making a direct near-vertical ascent to the surface at any point during the dive, and risk is considered low.

The equipment used for recreational diving is mostly open circuit scuba, though semi closed and fully automated electronic closed circuit rebreathers may be included in the scope of recreational diving. Risk is managed by training the diver in a range of standardised procedures and skills appropriate to the equipment the diver chooses to use and the environment in which the diver plans to dive. Further experience and development of skills by practice will improve the diver's ability to dive safely. Specialty training is made available by the recreational diver training industry and diving clubs to increase the range of environments and venues the diver can enjoy at an acceptable level of risk.

Reasons to dive and preferred diving activities may vary during the personal development of a recreational diver, and may depend on their psychological profile and their level of dedication to the activity. Most divers average less than eight dives per year, but some total several thousand dives over a few decades and continue diving into their 60s and 70s, occasionally older. Recreational divers may frequent local dive sites or dive as tourists at more distant venues known for desirable underwater environments. An economically significant diving tourism industry services recreational divers, providing equipment, training and diving experiences, generally by specialist providers known as dive centers, dive schools, live-aboard, day charter and basic dive boats.

Legal constraints on recreational diving vary considerably across jurisdictions. Recreational diving may be industry regulated or regulated by law to some extent. The legal responsibility for recreational diving service providers is usually limited as far as possible by waivers which they require the customer to sign before engaging in any diving activity. The extent of responsibility of recreational buddy divers is unclear, but buddy diving is generally recommended by recreational diver training agencies as safer than solo diving, and some service providers insist that customers dive in buddy pairs. The evidence supporting this policy is inconclusive: it may or may not reduce average risk to the clients by imposing a burden on some to the advantage of others, and may reduce liability risk for the service provider.

== Scope ==
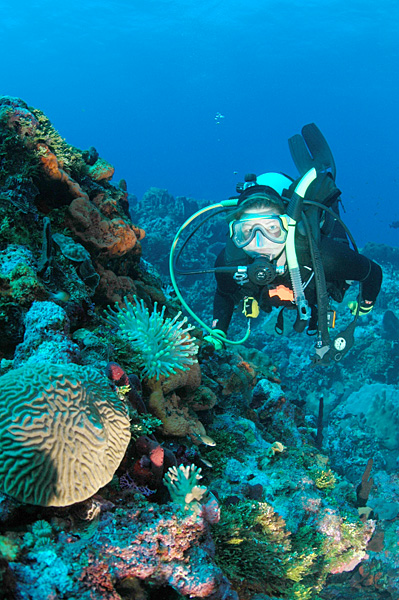
Scuba diver in Panama

Recreational diving may be considered to be any underwater diving that is not occupational, professional, or commercial, in that the dive is fundamentally at the discretion of the diver, who dives either to their own plan, or to a plan developed in consensus with the other divers in the group, though dives led by a professional dive leader or instructor for non-occupational purposes are also legally classified as recreational dives in some legislations.

The full scope of recreational diving includes breath-hold diving and surface supplied diving – particularly with lightweight semi-autonomous airline systems such as snuba – and technical diving (including penetration diving), as all of these are frequently done for recreational purposes, but common usage is mostly for open water scuba diving with limited decompression.

Scuba diving implies the use of an autonomous breathing gas supply carried by the diver, the self-contained underwater breathing apparatus which provides the name for this mode of diving. Scuba may be the simpler and more popular open circuit configuration or one of the more complex and expensive closed or semi-closed rebreather arrangements. Rebreathers used for recreational diving are generally designed to require a minimum task loading on the diver and as far as possible to fail safe and give the diver ample warning to bail out to open circuit and abort the dive.

Open water is the definitive environment for recreational diving, and in this context implies that there is no physical or physiological barrier to the diver concluding the dive at any time by a direct ascent to the surface, either vertically, or via a clearly visible route adequately illuminated by ambient light. Some organisations extend the scope of recreational diving to allow short decompression obligations which can be done without gas switching. Depth limitations are imposed by the certification agencies, and relate to the competency associated with the specific certification. Entry level divers may be restricted to a depth of 18 or 20 metres (59 or 66 ft), and more advanced divers to 30, 40, 50 or 60 m depending on the certification and agency. Junior divers may be restricted to shallower depths generally confined to a depth of 12 metres (39 ft).

Recreational diving is generally limited to the use of air or a single nitrox mixture with an oxygen fraction not exceeding 40% for the planned dive, but this does not preclude constant oxygen partial pressure nitrox provided by electronically controlled closed circuit rebreathers like the Poseidon Mk6 or variable nitrox mixtures such as provided by the earlier semi-closed circuit Dräger Ray rebreather. Emergency gas supplies are either by sharing with a dive buddy or from a bailout cylinder for open circuit diving, and by bailout to open circuit for rebreather diving.

Most recreational diving officially applies the buddy system, but in reality there are a significant proportion of dives which are either effectively solo dives or where larger groups of nominally paired divers follow a dive leader and may be escorted by another dive leader.

== Reasons to dive ==
The reasons to dive for recreational purposes are many and varied, and many divers will go through stages when their personal reasons for diving change, as the initial novelty of the alien environment becomes familiar and skills develop to the point where the diver is able to pay more attention to the surroundings.

Many people start diving for the adventure of experiencing a different environment and the ability to maneuver fairly freely in three dimensions, but the novelty wears off after a while. This may be replaced by the satisfaction of developing the skills to operate in a wider range of environments, and developing excellence in those skills, the addition of compatible interests and activities to complement the basic activity, like underwater photography and an interest in the details of the environment, including exploration and study and recording of aspects of the environment. Experience of the underwater environment varies depending on where the diver has access to suitable sites – there is more to see on a coastal reef than in most freshwater lakes, and scuba diving tourism can make a wide variety of more entertaining and challenging sites available. Exploration can also extend beyond tourism to the search for previously unvisited sites and the satisfaction of being the first to be there and in some cases, tell the story.

Reasons to dive include:

- Tourism and sight-seeing, including visiting a variety of places with different things to see.
- Extreme sport aspect: some divers wish to explore their personal limits and abilities under challenging conditions. This includes some competitive underwater sports, and environmental and physiological challenges.
- Naturalist and underwater life observers. This may be combined with recording the environment and contributing to citizen science databases.
- Exploration: the underwater environment is relatively unexplored, it is not difficult to find places where no-one has gone before or if they have, no-one has recorded the fact or described or surveyed the site, even quite close to heavily populated areas. The marine ecosystems are largely undescribed, and there are many undiscovered species yet to be found and described. There are shipwrecks and flooded caves to challenge the adventurous and foolhardy.
- Stress management: recreational diving in reasonably good conditions which are comfortably managed by the diver can produce health benefits of mood improvement.

== Activities ==
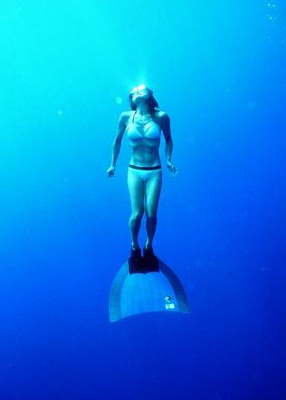
Free diver (breath hold) in Cyprus

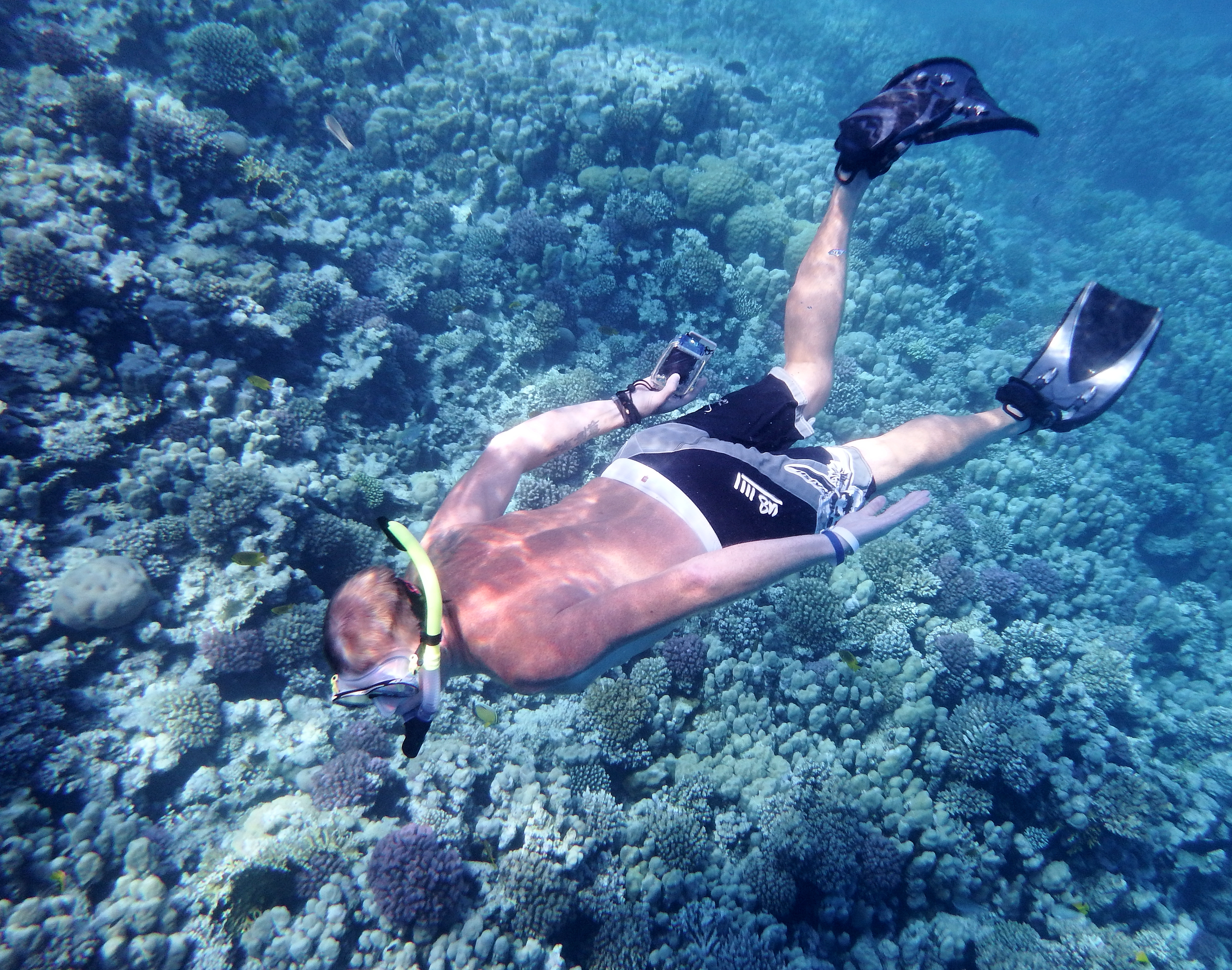
Freediving while snorkeling in shallow water, Red Sea

There are many recreational diving activities, and equipment and environmental specialties which require skills additional to those provided by the entry level courses, These skills were originally developed by trial and error, but training programmes are offered by most diver training agencies for the convenience of the diver, and profit for the agency, or in the case of club oriented systems, for the overall benefit of the club community:

Activities:

- Snorkeling – Swimming at the surface with a diving mask and snorkel to view the shallow underwater environment.
- Free-diving (also called skin diving) – Swimming below the surface on breath-hold.
- Identifying, surveying, and monitoring sea life and freshwater life: This may be associated with citizen science projects and underwater photography (see also marine biology).
- Maritime archeology or Underwater archeology – Also may be associated with citizen science and underwater photography
- Rescue Diver – Usually considered a desirable diving skill, but may be part of the requirements and function of volunteer safety divers, and generally a requirement for any dive leadership certification.
- Underwater navigation – Enhanced competence at following and recording underwater routes, generally excluding the use of a guide-line, which is considered a separate competence, and using a compass and landmarks.
- Underwater photography – Use of photographic equipment designed or modified for underwater use for recording the environment or artistic purposes.
- Underwater search and recovery Knowledge and procedural skills for conducting underwater searches and recovering relatively small objects from underwater.
- Underwater videography – Use of video recording equipment designed or modified for underwater use for recording the environment or artistic purposes.
- Underwater hunting and gathering for sport and food. The ecological impact is variable, but can be severe.

=== Specialties ===
Some recreational diving activities require skills sufficiently beyond the basic recreational open water diving skill set that they are classed by the recreational diver training industry as specialties, and for which further training and certification is available. These can be broadly distinguished as environmental and equipment specialties.

Environmental specialties:

- Altitude diving – Knowledge and skills associated with diving in waters where the surface pressure is significantly below average sea level pressure, and affects decompression.
- Cave diving – Knowledge and procedural skills related to managing risk in underwater cave environments.
- Deep diving – Knowledge and procedural skills related to managing risk at greater depths, and the decompression associated with deep exposure.
- Drift diving – Procedures used to dive while transported by currents.
- Ice diving – Knowledge and procedural skills related to managing risk in very cold water and under an ice surface layer.
- Low impact diving – Knowledge and procedural skills intended to minimise the environmental impact of recreational diving, mainly by minimising contact with the sensitive reef life, but it also applies to diving on fragile structure of historical wrecks and in caves with delicate rock formations.
- Night diving – Knowledge and procedural skills related to managing risk while diving in very low levels of natural illumination.
- Underwater surveys and mapping of dive sites, in caves, wrecks and open water reefs. A part of recording exploration, and of archaeological work.
- Wreck diving – Knowledge and procedural skills related to managing risk while diving inside wrecks.

Equipment specialties:

- Dry suit – Knowledge and procedural skills related to managing risk associated with the use of dry suits, and optimising their usage.
- Rebreather – Knowledge and procedural skills related to managing risk related to diving with rebreathers. Type certification is often required for the specific model of rebreather.
- Sidemount diving – Knowledge and procedural skills related to use of side-mounted scuba equipment.
- Nitrox diving – Knowledge related to managing risk when using nitrox as a breathing gas.
- Recreational trimix diving – Knowledge related to managing risk when using trimix as a breathing gas. The depths which make trimix a preferred breathing gas also often imply obligatory decompression and gas switching for accelerated decompression.
- Safe use of a diver propulsion vehicle (scooter). This activity is not generally associated with a formal training programme and certification, but some practice and knowledge is necessary for safe and effective use, particularly in combination with other complex or high risk activities or equipment.

Many diver training agencies such as ACUC, BSAC, CMAS, IANTD, NAUI, PADI, PDIC, SDI, and SSI offer training in these areas, as well as opportunities to move into professional dive leadership, instruction, technical diving, public safety diving and others.

== History ==
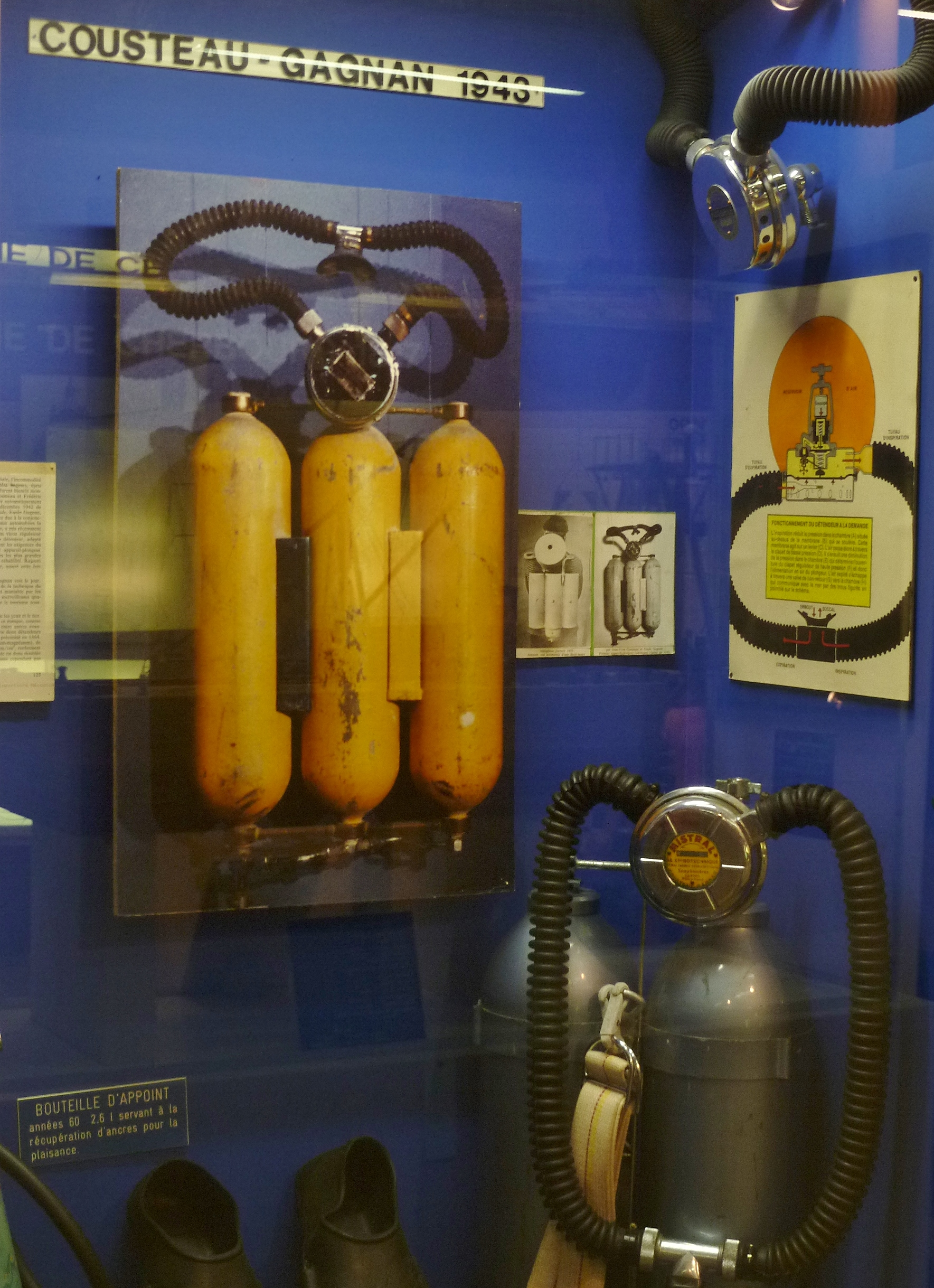
The invention of the aqua-lung in 1943 led to modern recreational diving.

Recreational scuba diving grew out of related activities such as Snorkeling and underwater hunting. For a long time, recreational underwater excursions were limited by breath-hold time. The invention of the aqualung in 1943 by Émile Gagnan and Jacques-Yves Cousteau and the wetsuit in 1952 by University of California, Berkeley physicist, Hugh Bradner and its development over subsequent years led to a revolution in recreational diving. However, for much of the 1950s and early 1960s, recreational scuba diving was a sport limited to those who were able to afford or make their own kit, and prepared to undergo intensive training to use it.

As the sport became more popular, manufacturers became aware of the potential market, and equipment began to appear that was easy to use, affordable and reliable. Continued advances in SCUBA technology, such as buoyancy compensators, improved diving regulators, wet or dry suits, and dive computers, increased the safety, comfort and convenience of the gear encouraging more people to train and use it.

Until the early 1950s, navies and other organizations performing professional diving were the only providers of diver training, but only for their own personnel and only using their own types of equipment. The first scuba diving school was opened in France to train the owners of the Cousteau and Gagnan designed twin-hose scuba. The first school to teach single hose scuba was started in 1953, in Melbourne, Australia, at the Melbourne City Baths. RAN Commander Batterham organized the school to assist the inventor of the single hose regulator, Ted Eldred. However, neither of these schools was international in nature.

There were no formal training courses available to civilians who bought the early scuba equipment. Some of the first training started in 1952 at the Scripps Institution of Oceanography where Andy Rechnitzer, Bob Dill and Connie Limbaugh taught the first scuba courses in the United States, then in 1953 Trevor Hampton created the first British diving school, the British Underwater Centre and in 1954 when Los Angeles County created an Underwater Instructor Certification Course based on the training that they received from the scientific divers of the Scripps Institution of Oceanography. Early instruction developed in the format of amateur teaching within a club environment, as exemplified by organizations such as the Scottish Sub Aqua Club and the British Sub Aqua Club from 1953, Los Angeles County from 1954 and the YMCA from 1959.

Professional instruction started in 1959 when the non-profit NAUI was formed, which later effectively was split, to form the for-profit PADI in 1966. The National Association of Scuba Diving Schools (NASDS) started with their dive center based training programs in 1960 followed by SSI in 1970. Professional Diving Instructors College was formed in 1965, changing its name in 1984 to Professional Diving Instructors Corporation (PDIC).

In 2009 PADI alone issued approximately 950,000 diving certifications. Approximately 550,000 of these certifications were "entry level" certifications and the remainder were more advanced certifications.

Scuba-diving has become a popular leisure activity, and many diving destinations have some form of dive shop presence that can offer air fills, equipment sale, rental and repair, and training. In tropical and sub-tropical parts of the world, there is a large market for 'holiday divers'; people who train and dive while on holiday, but rarely dive close to home.

Technical diving and the use of rebreathers are increasing, particularly in areas of the world where deeper wreck diving is the main underwater attraction. Generally, recreational diving depths are limited by the training agencies to a maximum of between 30 and 40 meters (98 and 131 ft), beyond which a variety of safety issues such as oxygen toxicity and nitrogen narcosis significantly increase the risk of diving using recreational diving equipment and practices, and specialized skills and equipment for technical diving are needed.

== Standard equipment ==
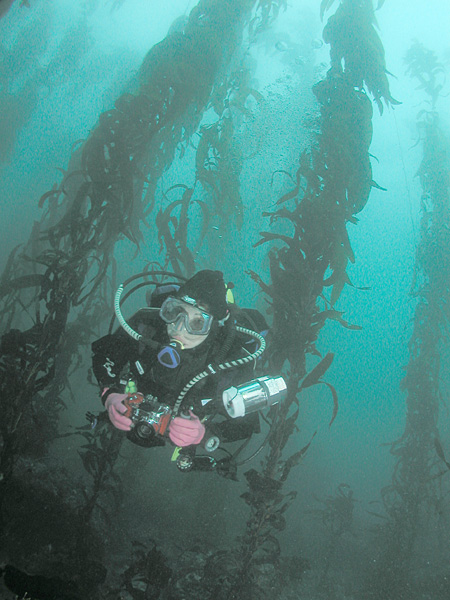
Scuba diver wearing a dry suit in a kelp forest off Point Lobos, California

The standard recreational open circuit scuba equipment includes the following items:

Basic equipment, which can be used for most modes of ambient pressure diving:

- a diving mask for underwater vision;
- a snorkel to aid surface swimming;
- a pair of swimfins, for mobility;
- a diving suit, which may be a dry suit, wetsuit or dive skins, or a regular swimsuit, depending on the water temperature and other factors, for thermal and environmental protection;
- a diving weighting system such as a weight belt or BCD integrated weight system, to counteract the buoyancy of the fully equipped diver (mostly the diving suit);

A scuba set, comprising:

- a single diving cylinder (also known as scuba tank), with cylinder valve, to supply breathing air, and a harness to support it. In the past, twin cylinders were also popular.
- a buoyancy compensator, (also known as buoyancy control device or BCD), which is usually part of the harness used to carry the cylinder, to adjust buoyancy by controlled inflation and deflation.
- a diving regulator to reduce the pressure of the air from the cylinder, with:
  - a primary second stage, to supply the diver with ambient pressure air on demand;
  - a secondary second stage (octopus) to supply emergency air to a buddy diver who needs assistance;
  - a submersible pressure gauge (SPG) (also known as contents gauge), to monitor the remaining air supply;
  - a low pressure inflation hose for the buoyancy compensator, and if applicable, for the dry suit, to inflate the BCD and suit for buoyancy control and to avoid suit squeeze.

Auxiliary equipment to enhance safety.

- a dive computer (also known as personal decompression computer) or a depth gauge and timer, to monitor the dive profile, avoid decompression obligation and facilitate a controlled ascent;
- a surface marker buoy or other surface detection aid may be standard equipment in some regions to allow the surface crew and boats to monitor the diver's position.
- a diver's cutting tool should be carried in areas where there is a significant risk of entanglement in ropes, lines, or nets. (usually lost or discarded fishing gear)

For solo diving a bailout cylinder is considered standard for dives where there is an appreciable risk of entrapment, or where a direct controlled emergency swimming ascent is not an acceptable option to manage an out-of-air incident at any point in the planned dive profile.

== Standard procedures ==
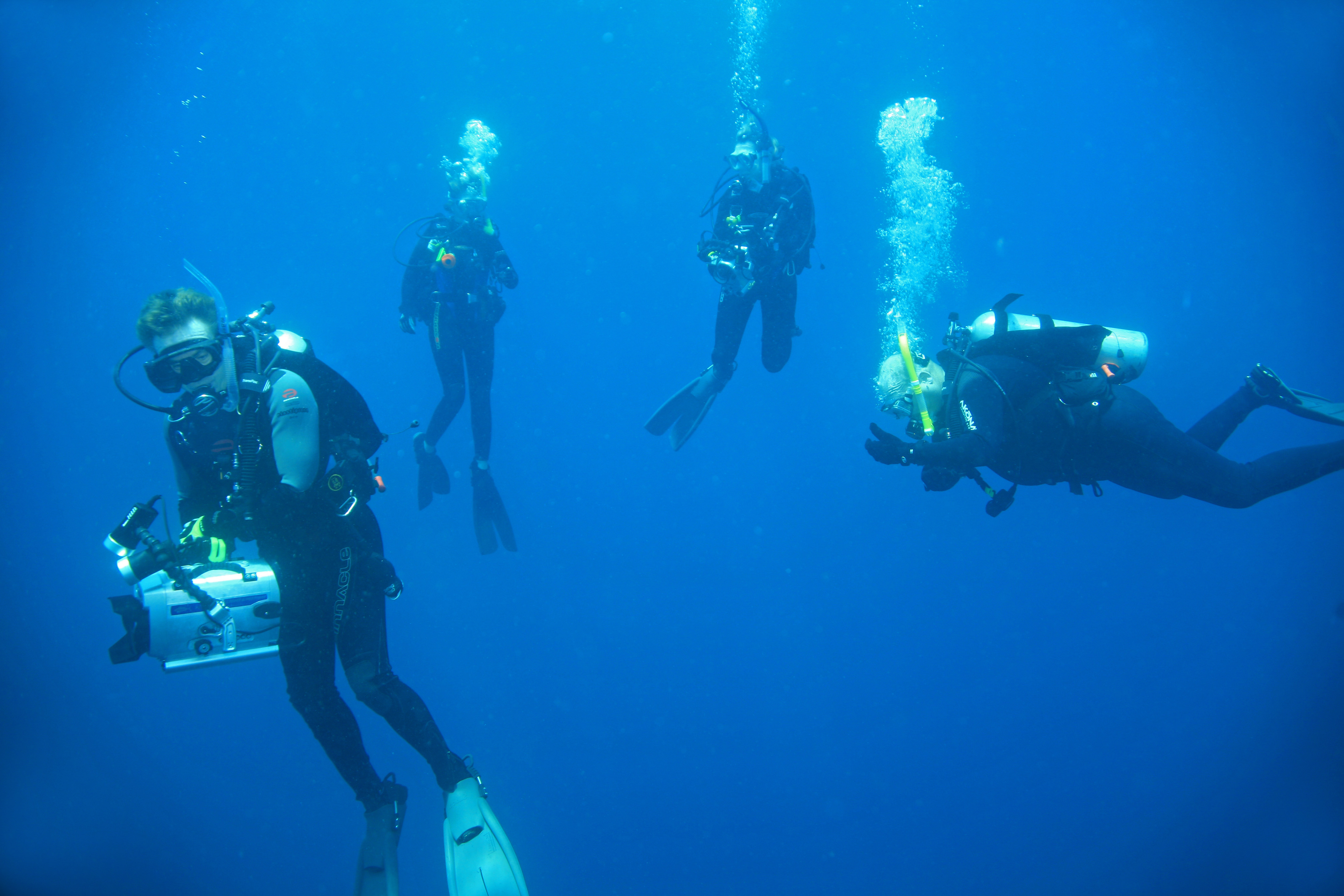
Divers making a recommended shallow stop during ascent to the surface

Some skills are generally accepted by recreational diver certification agencies as necessary for any scuba diver to be considered competent to dive without direct supervision, and others are more advanced, though some diver certification and accreditation organizations may consider some of these to also be essential for minimum acceptable entry level competence. Divers are instructed and assessed on these skills during basic and advanced training, and are expected to remain competent at their level of certification, either by practice or refresher courses.

The skills include selection, functional testing, preparation and transport of scuba equipment, dive planning, preparation for a dive, kitting up for the dive, water entry, descent, breathing underwater, monitoring the dive profile (depth, time and decompression status), personal breathing gas management, situational awareness, communicating with the dive team, buoyancy and trim control, mobility in the water, ascent, emergency and rescue procedures, exit from the water, un-kitting after the dive, cleaning and preparation of equipment for storage, and recording the dive, within the scope of the diver's certification. A significant amount of harmonization of training standards and standard and emergency procedures has developed over the years, largely due to organisations like World Recreational Scuba Training Council. This allows divers trained by the various certifying organisations to dive together with a minimum of confusion, which enhances safety. Diver communications is a particular aspect where most of the basic hand signals are common to most recreational diver training agencies.

This does not mean that there is no variation. There are some procedures such as emergency donation of air which are quite strongly polarized between those who advocate donation of the secondary (octopus) regulator and those who advocate donating the primary regulator. Length of regulator hose and position of the secondary second stage depend on the donation technique.

There are also variations in procedures for self rescue in an out-of-air situation, and in procedures for bringing an unresponsive casualty to the surface.

Solo diving, once considered technical diving and discouraged by most certification agencies, is now seen by many experienced divers and some certification agencies as an acceptable practice for those divers suitably trained and experienced. Rather than relying on the traditional buddy diving safety system, solo divers rely on self-sufficiency and are willing to take responsibility for their own safety while diving.

Buddy diving is the more generally advocated procedural alternative, on the principle that in case of an emergency, a dive buddy can assist the diver in difficulty, but this is only valid if the buddy is close enough to help, notices the problem, and is competent and willing to assist.

== Training ==
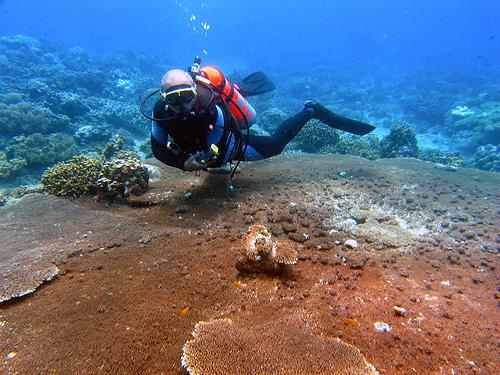
Diver off Carmen, Philippines

Many recreational diver training organisations exist, throughout the world, offering diver training leading to certification: the issuing of a "diver certification card", also known as a "C-card", or qualification card.

Recreational diver training courses range from minor specialties which require one classroom session and an open water dive, and which may be completed in a day, to complex specialties which may take several days to weeks, and require several classroom sessions, confined water skills training and practice, and a substantial number of open-water dives, followed by rigorous assessment of knowledge and skills. Details on the approximate duration of training can be found on the websites of most certification agencies, but accurate schedules are generally only available from the specific school or instructor who will present that course, as this will depend on the local conditions and other constraints.

Diving instructors affiliated to a diving certification agency may work independently or through a university, a dive club, a dive school or a dive shop. They will offer courses that should meet, or exceed, the standards of the certification organisation that will certify the divers attending the course.

=== Diving skills ===
Diver training can be divided into entry-level training, which are those skills and knowledge considered essential for the diver to dive unsupervised at an acceptably low level of risk by the certifying agency, and further skills and knowledge which allow better performance and extend the environmental capacity and equipment choices of the diver.

==== Entry level ====
There is a significant variation in entry-level training, with some training agencies requiring the bare minimum as specified by RSTC and ISO, and others requiring a greater level of competence with associated assumption of lower risk to the diver and dive buddy, and less likelihood of environmental damage. Entry level training may include skills for assisting or rescue of another diver, but this is not always the case. Divers without rescue training are routinely assigned to dive as buddy pairs to follow organizational protocols. This is not generally a contravention of the training agencies' recommendations.

The initial training for open water certification for a person who is medically fit to dive and a reasonably competent swimmer is relatively short. The minimum number of open-water dives required for certification is usually four, but instructors are generally required by training standards to ensure that the diver is sufficiently skilled to dive safely in the local environment before certification is issued, and this may require further training and experience beyond the required minimum. Many dive shops in popular holiday locations offer courses intended to teach a novice to dive in a few days, which can be combined with diving on the vacation. Other instructors and dive schools will provide more thorough training, which generally takes longer.

==== Beyond entry level ====
Skills and knowledge beyond the minimum requirement are generally labelled Advanced skills, and these may include skills such as competent buoyancy control, which are included in the entry level skills by other agencies. Many skills which are considered advanced by recreational training agencies are considered basic entry-level skills for professional divers.

=== Training standards ===
Scuba diving education levels as used by ISO: PADI, CMAS, SSI and NAUI

Each diver certification agency has its own set of diver training standards for each level of certification that they issue. Although these standards are usually available on request or on the organisation's website, the assessment criteria are often not available to the public, making a direct comparison of standards difficult. Most agencies comply with the minimum requirements of the World Recreational Scuba Training Council (WRSTC) or ISO for the relevant certification (ISO 24801-2 Autonomous diver, and ISO 24801-3 Dive leader), but most certification levels are not defined by the international standards.

Under most entry-level programs (SEI, SDI, PADI, BSAC, SSAC, NAUI, SSI, and PDIC), divers can complete a certification with as few as four open water dives. This complies with the minimum requirements of ISO 24801-2 Autonomous diver. Such a qualification allows divers to rent equipment, receive air fills, and dive without supervision to depths typically restricted to 18 meters (59 feet) with an equally qualified buddy in conditions similar to, or easier than those in which they were trained. Certification agencies advise their students to dive within the scope of their experience and training, and to extend their training to suit the conditions in which they plan to dive.

In the 1980s, several agencies with DEMA collaborated to author ANSI Standard Z86.3 (1989), Minimum Course Content For Safe Scuba Diving which defines their training as the Accepted Industry Practices. The International Standards Organisation has since published ISO 24801 and ISO 24802 which define minimum training standards for two levels of recreational diver and for recreational diving instructors.

A few recreational certification agencies such as GUE, and the commercial diver training standards of several countries, including the United Kingdom, Australia, South Africa, and Canada, consider the competence provided by the recreational diver training industry minimum standard to be inadequate for safe diving, particularly occupational diving, where the diver has a legal duty of care towards other members of the dive team, even though the responsibility for occupational dive planning and safety is held by a professional diving supervisor.

== Safety ==
=== Risk ===
Recreational scuba diving involves physical and psychological risks and therefore can be classified as an extreme sport. Fatality rates of 16.4 deaths per 100,000 persons per year among DAN America members and 14.4 deaths per 100,000 persons per year the British Sub-Aqua Club (BSAC) members were similar and did not change during 2000–2006. This is comparable with jogging (13 deaths per 100,000 persons per year) and motor vehicle accidents (16 deaths per 100,000 persons per year), and within the range where reduction is desirable by Health and Safety Executive (HSE) criteria.

Data for 17 million student-diver certifications during 63 million student dives over a 20-year period from 1989 to 2008 show a mean per capita death rate of 1.7 deaths per 100,000 student divers per year. This was lower than for insured DAN members during 2000–2006 at 16.4 deaths per 100,000 DAN members per year, but fatality rate per dive is a better measure of exposure risk, A mean annual fatality rate of 0.48 deaths per 100,000 student dives per year and 0.54 deaths per 100,000 BSAC dives per year and 1.03 deaths per 100,000 non-BSAC dives per year during 2007. The total size of the diving population is important for determining overall fatality rates, and the population estimates from the 1990s of several million U.S. divers need to be updated.

The most frequent root cause for diving fatalities is running out of or low on gas. Other factors cited include loss of buoyancy control, entanglement or entrapment, rough water, equipment misuse or problems, and emergency ascent, which is often a response to a breathing gas problem. The most common injuries and causes of death were drowning or asphyxia due to inhalation of water, air embolism and cardiac events. Risk of cardiac arrest is greater for older divers, and greater for men than women, although the risks are equal by age 65.

Several plausible opinions have been put forward but have not yet been empirically validated. Suggested contributing factors included inexperience, infrequent diving, inadequate supervision, insufficient predive briefings, buddy separation, and dive conditions beyond the diver's training, experience, or physical capacity.

== Legal status ==
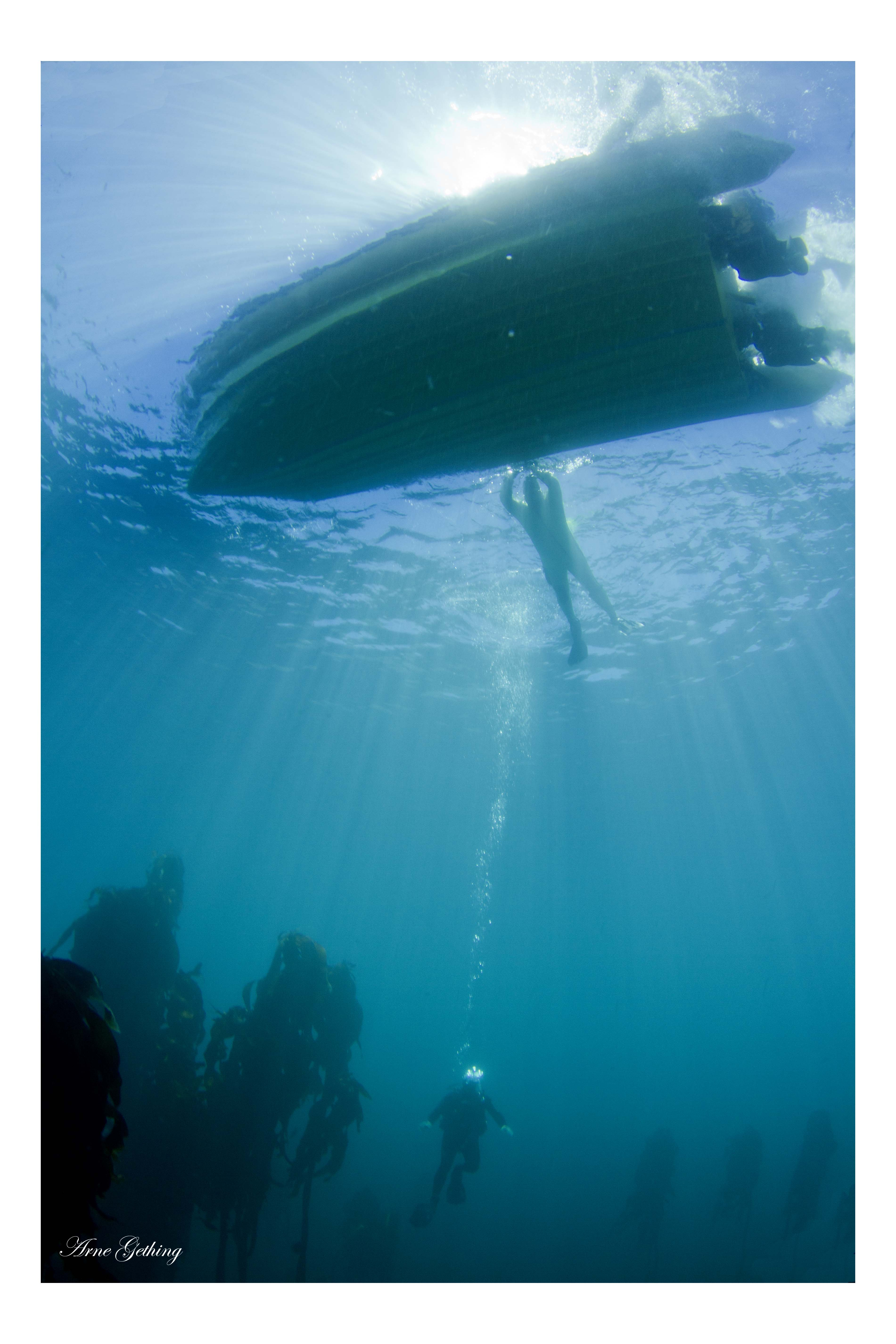
Ascending towards a dive boat, Hout Bay, South Africa

Legal constraints on recreational diving vary considerably across jurisdictions. In many countries recreational diving is either not mentioned at all in laws and regulations, or specifically excluded from regulations covering occupational diving. In others, only diver training and dive-leading activities where the diver is either employed or takes a leadership position where they are responsible for the safety of others is covered by legislation. At the other extreme, countries such as Israel have statutory law covering all recreational diving activities.

Recreational diver training and dive leading are industry regulated in some countries, and only directly regulated by government in a subset of them. In the UK, HSE legislation includes recreational diver training and dive leading for reward; in the US and South Africa industry regulation is accepted, though non-specific health and safety legislation still applies. In Israel recreational diving activities are regulated by the Recreational Diving Act, 1979.

The legal responsibility for recreational diving service providers is usually limited as far as possible by waivers which they require the customer to sign before engaging in any diving activity. The extent of responsibility of recreational buddy divers is unclear and has been the subject of considerable litigation. It is probable that it varies between jurisdictions. In spite of this lack of clarity, and conflicting evidence, buddy diving is recommended by recreational diver training agencies as safer than solo diving, and some service providers insist that customers dive in buddy pairs.

== Economic impact ==
Recreational diving provides a market for the diving equipment industry, the diver training industry and the diver services industry, all of which are interdependent, and at retail level, frequently provided by the same local specialist outlet, thus contributing to the local economy. These activities contribute to generation of revenue through dive tours, certification courses and equipment rentals which in turn, support wages for dive charter captains and crews, and hotel and its employees.

Diving activities aid in marine ecosystem conservation, supporting the development of infrastructure and services like videography, scientific researches and other local businesses, simultaneously promoting tourism.

The combined contribution of recreational scuba diving and snorkeling to the US gross domestic product was estimated at $11 billion in a 2019 report by the Diving Equipment and Marketing Association.

Scuba diving tourism is the industry based on servicing the requirements of recreational divers at destinations other than where they live. It includes aspects of training, equipment sales, rental and service, guided experiences and environmental tourism. Customer satisfaction is largely dependent on the quality of services provided, and personal communication has a strong influence on the popularity of specific service providers in a region.

== Demographics ==
A 2014 survey of American divers indicates with a high level of confidence for the specified population, that about 3.145 million Americans (1.1 percent of population) took part in scuba diving at least once in the survey year, which is a 0.9 percent decrease over 2013, but participation increased by 1.3 percent on average for the previous five years. There were about 2.252 million casual participants who made between one and seven dives per year and 893,000 core participants who dived eight or more times per year. 66% of casual and 74% of core participants were male. The age distribution of casual and core participants differs. Core participants tend to be older. Casual participation tends to gradually rise to a peak in early middle age, then drop markedly after about 45 years old, while core participation tends to continue at a relatively consistent rate over age groups up to about 65 years, after which it drops markedly. Some training agencies will accept trainees as young as 8 years old for participation in supervised scuba experiences, and 10 years for certification. The record age for a scuba dive as of January 2020 is 95 years. Recreational scuba divers appear to be on average wealthier and better educated than the general population, as indicated by earlier surveys. There is a greater tendency than average for scuba divers to participate in other sporting and exercise activities than the general population, but lack of adequate physical fitness is frequently cited as a contributory factor in diving accidents.

The medical literature, anecdotal evidence and a small-scale survey suggest that a significant part of the recreational scuba diving population may have chronic medical conditions that affect their fitness to dive according to the Recreational Scuba Training Council's guidelines. This may have an influence on risk, as unfitness and preexisting medical conditions are frequently cited in incident reports where the incident was adequately investigated.

PADI worldwide certification statistics indicate a slow but steady trend of increasing proportion of certification of female divers at all levels from 34.4% in 2013 to 38.0% in 2018, and a decrease in the average age of certifications over the same period.

Personality profiles of recreational divers were analysed in a 2010 study on entry level divers: The participants scored high on self-sufficiency, impulsiveness and boldness and low on warmth, sensitivity and conformity, and differed from the typical extreme sport participant's personality profile. Personality types identified include adventurer, dreamer, rationalist and passive-aggressive macho diver, and results suggested that the risk behaviour likely to be exhibited by the diver would depend on their personality type.

== Venues for diving ==
Most types of bodies of water can be used as dive sites:

- Seas and oceans – these consist of salt water and a huge variety of flora and fauna.
- Lakes – small lakes are often used for diver training. Large lakes have many features of seas including wrecks and a variety of aquatic life. Some lakes are high in altitude, and they require special considerations for diving. See altitude diving
- Caves – these are more adventurous and dangerous than normal diving. See cave diving.
- Rivers – are often shallow, murky and may have strong currents.
- Man-made lakes, such as dams and flooded clay pits, gravel pits and quarries.
- Swimming pools are popular as training venues, and for some underwater sports.

Flooded excavations often have low visibility. Disused and flooded quarries are popular in inland areas for diver training as well as recreational diving. Rock quarries may have reasonable underwater visibility – there is often little mud or silt to create mid-water particles that cause low visibility, and the lack of flow allows silt to settle on the bottom, where it may later be kicked up by unskilled divers to temporarily reduce visibility locally. As they are not natural environments, and usually privately owned, quarries may contain objects intentionally placed for divers to explore, such as sunken boats, automobiles, aircraft, or structures like grain silos and gravel chutes. The popularity of a dive site will usually depend on accessibility, known hazards, desirable features, and the variety of alternative options nearby. Sites known for exceptionally desirable features may attract expeditions in spite of major accessibility problems and significant hazards.

=== Dive site features ===
Many types of underwater features make an interesting dive site, for example:

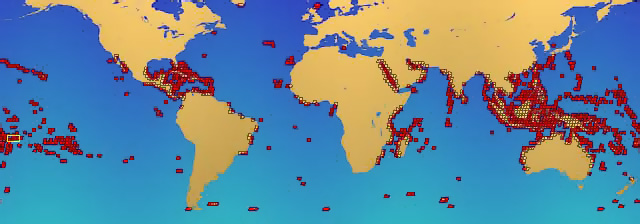
NASA image showing locations of significant coral reefs, which are often sought out by divers for their abundant, diverse life forms

- Wildlife at the site. Popular examples are coral, sponges, fish, sting rays, molluscs, cetaceans, seals, sharks and crustaceans.
- The topography of the site. Coral reefs, drop offs (underwater cliffs), rock reefs, gullies and caves can be spectacular. Deep dive sites mean divers must reduce the time they spend because more gas is breathed at depth and decompression sickness risks increase. Shallow regions can be investigated by snorkeling. Wall diving allows a range of depths in a small area.
- Historical or cultural items at the site. Shipwrecks and sunken aircraft, apart from their historical value, form artificial habitats for marine fauna making them attractive dive sites.
- Underwater visibility varies widely. Poor visibility is caused by particles suspended in the water, such as silt, plankton and sewage. Dive sites that are close to sources of these particles, such as human settlements and river estuaries, are more prone to poor visibility. Currents and turbulence can stir up particles which had settled, and may keep them in suspension. Diving close to sediments on the bottom can result in the particles being kicked up by wash from the divers fins. Good visibility is a highly desirable characteristic for a dive site, and can significantly influence risk.
- Temperature. Warm water diving is comfortable and convenient. Although cold water is uncomfortable and can cause hypothermia it can be interesting because different species of underwater life thrive in cold conditions. For cold water divers tend to prefer dry suits with inner thermal clothing which offer greater thermal protection, although they require additional knowledge and skill to use safely.
- Currents. Currents can transport nutrients to underwater wildlife increasing the variety and density of that life at the site. Currents can also be dangerous to divers as they can carry them away from their surface support or suitable exit points. Currents that meet large underwater obstructions can cause strong up or down flow that can be dangerous because it may cause the diver to rapidly change depth, with possible loss of buoyancy control and increased risk of barotrauma and decompression sickness.

== Marine citizen science ==
Marine citizen science, the scientific research and monitoring projects for which members of the public collect, categorize, transcribe or analyze scientific data, is an increasingly popular but underutilised collaboration between society and institutionalised scientific research, in which members of the recreational scuba diving community actively participate in marine data acquisition and recording, largely by way of geolocated photographic observations collected during recreational dives, but also in more structured and long term experimental work. Some barriers exist between divers and projects that are beyond the control of either the divers or the project organisers, but other aspects such as access to projects and feedback after participation are amenable to improvement. Recreational scuba divers are generally well disposed towards marine science, and participation could be improved by better management. Stakeholders to be considered are the scuba diving industry and professional intermediaries.

Citizen science can be an effective approach to marine and coastal conservation, and methods of making better use of citizen input for projects relating to policy, education, community capacity building, site management, species management, and research. have been investigated and developed. Marine citizen science projects face different challenges to terrestrial systems. The main challenges are logistical, as people spend very little time in the water. Access often requires expensive boats, diving gear, or transportation to the coast, and safety and liability issues can be complicated. Using citizen scientists can economically increase the temporal and spatial scale of a project. Early involvement of divers in the planning of a project can increase buy-in and avoid errors due to inaccurate assessment of capabilities and interest of volunteers. Training and some field oversight by professionals will usually be necessary to ensure reliable data collection. Retention of volunteers is affected by their perception of the recognition of the value of their work.

The availability of affordable and compact high definition video and easy to operate underwater cameras allows citizen scientists to provide reliable observations that can be archived and reviewed by experts when desirable. Accuracy of geolocation is generally lower than for terrestrial observations as the GPS features available on many digital cameras do not work underwater, and most cameras do not record depth.

== See also ==
- Freediving – Underwater diving without breathing apparatus
- Scuba diving – Swimming underwater, breathing gas carried by the diver
- Scuba diving tourism – Industry based on recreational diver travel
- Snorkeling – Swimming while inhaling through a snorkel
- Snuba – Limited depth airline breathing apparatus towed by the diver
- Technical diving – Diving beyond the scope of recreational diving
- Recreational dive sites – Places that divers go to enjoy the underwater environment
- Recreational diver training – Training process for people who do not dive at work
- Diving Equipment and Marketing Association – International trade association for the recreational diving equipment industry
