= Buddy diving =

Practice of mutual monitoring and assistance between two divers

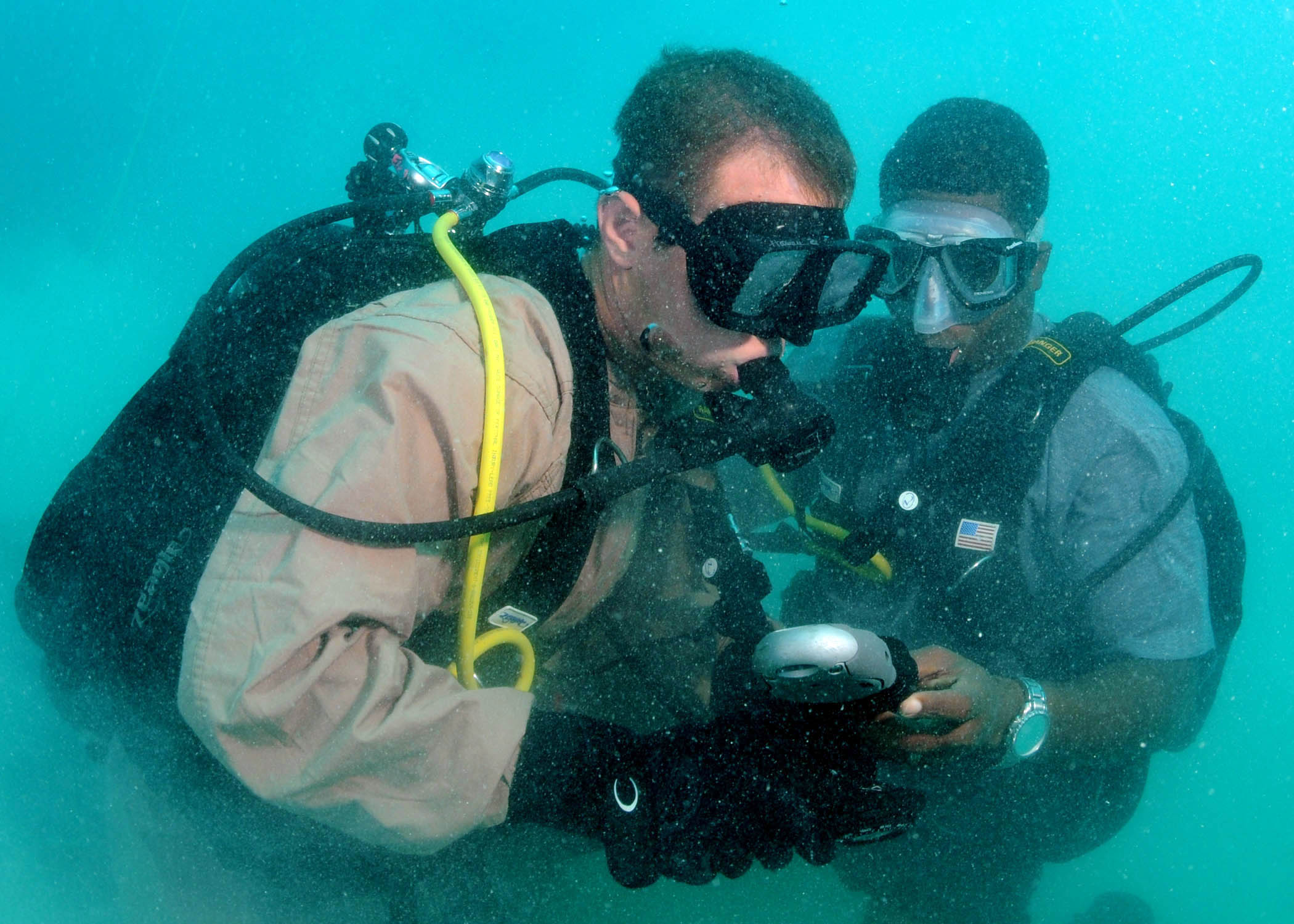
A Navy buddy diver team checking their gauges together

Buddy diving is the use of the buddy system by scuba divers and freedivers. It is a set of safety procedures intended to improve the chances of avoiding or surviving accidents in or under water by having divers dive in a group of two or sometimes three. When using the buddy system, members of the group dive together and co-operate with each other, so that they can help or rescue each other in the event of an emergency. This is most effective if both divers are competent in all relevant skills and sufficiently aware of the situation that they can respond in time, which is a matter of both attitude and competence.

In recreational diving, a pair of divers is usually considered best for buddy diving. With threesomes, one diver can easily lose the attention of the other two, and groups of more than three divers are not using the buddy system. The system is likely to be effective in mitigating out-of-air emergencies, non-diving medical emergencies and entrapment in ropes or nets. When used with the buddy check it can help avoid the omission, misuse and failure of diving equipment.

The buddy system is the situation which occurs when two divers of similar interest and equal experience and ability share a dive, continuously monitoring each other throughout the entry, the dive and the exit, and remaining within such distance that they could render immediate assistance to each other if required.

— Bob Halstead, Line dancing and the buddy system

In technical diving activities such as cave diving, threesomes are considered an acceptable practice. This is usually referred to as team diving to distinguish it from buddy diving in pairs. Freedivers may also operate in groups of three, to make more efficient use of dive time, as a recently surfaced diver requires recovery time before they are ready to stand by for another diver's dive.

When professional divers dive as buddy pairs their responsibility to each other is specified as part of standard operating procedures, code of practice or governing legislation.

== Purpose ==
The buddy system is a procedure in which two individuals, the "buddies", operate together as a team so that they are able to monitor and help each other. According to Merriam-Webster, the first known use of the phrase "buddy system" goes back to 1942. Webster goes on to define the buddy system as "an arrangement in which two individuals are paired (as for mutual safety in a hazardous situation)."

In adventurous or dangerous activities, where buddies are often required, the main benefit of the system is improved safety; each may be able to prevent the other from becoming a casualty or rescue the other in a crisis. The system is also used in training, as a mentorship system, by which the less experienced buddy learns more quickly from close and frequent contact with feedback from the experienced buddy.

Buddy diving is intended to enhance the safety of scuba diving by having two or three competent divers acting as safety divers for each other during a dive in conditions that are within their capabilities, and using equipment that is familiar to all team members. In principle, each diver is capable of rendering assistance to the other in any reasonably foreseeable contingency, and willing to do so within the scope of acceptable personal risk. The buddy divers are expected to take mutual responsibility for the safety of the buddy pair above and below the water, and this responsibility commences when the divers prepare for the dive. It is assumed that it is unlikely that both divers will experience the same problem at the same time, allowing the diver not in trouble to assist when the other diver has difficulties. This mutual responsibility is usually not required by legislation, is entirely voluntary unless required by terms of service of a service provider, and generally cannot be enforced.

This purpose is theoretically fulfilled by the buddy assisting the diver to kit up, checking that the diver's equipment is correctly assembled and mounted, assisting the diver into the water where appropriate, checking for leaks, mutually monitoring gas usage, providing an alternate breathing gas supply in case of an emergency, performing a rescue if one diver is unable to manage an emergency, and assisting each other out of the water after the dive if appropriate. This system can mitigate high-risk emergencies when performed to the standards. This is not a controversial issue. This level of assistance requires the buddy to be familiar with the diver's equipment in detail, including the adjustment of harness and emergency release of weighting systems, operation of each others inflation and dump valves, siting and attachment of secondary demand valve, knife and any other safety equipment. Recreational divers may be trained in some or all of these skills depending on their certification. The buddy system is not considered sufficient on its own. Dive planning, medical and physical fitness to dive, suitable and correctly functioning equipment, appropriate surface support, skills, experience and knowledge are all part of the diving safety system. To be fully effective, the buddy system is applied to an agreed dive plan, with effective communications, the willingness and ability to assist each other in all reasonably foreseeable circumstances associated with the dive plan, and the will to follow the dive plan.

== Requirements ==
For the buddy system to function effectively, each buddy must be sufficiently competent to provide the required service, and be present when it is needed. Several conditions must exist for the buddy system to succeed:

- The divers must know and accept the dive plan.
- Equipment must be compatible with the dive plan, and reasonably foreseeable contingencies.
- Divers must be fit to dive in the expected conditions.
- They must be competent to perform the dive plan and carry out procedures to deal with reasonably foreseeable contingencies.
- The divers must know how to operate their own and their buddy's equipment, as they may have to operate it under stressful conditions.
- They must be willing to accept increased personal risk in the event that they need to assist a distressed buddy, and must understand when such risk becomes unacceptable.
- They must remain in the immediate vicinity of each other during the entire dive, close enough to communicate adequately and to render assistance in time.
- Divers must monitor and communicate as needed to remain aware of the status of themselves and other team members, their decompression status and their life-support equipment throughout the dive, from entering the water until the last diver leaves the water.
- Both divers are equally responsible for ensuring that they know where the other is, and that the other knows where they are at all times. This is the usual point at which the buddy system fails and divers are separated, making all the other conditions irrelevant. At this point they have lost the potential assistance of the buddy which is the main purpose of the system. Sometimes they find each other again. Usually nobody dies.

Most recreational divers never advance to a high level of competency as might be indicated by certification and experience, and furthermore, many divers do not dive sufficiently frequently to maintain their skills. Nevertheless, they are routinely expected to provide assistance to their dive buddies in the event of an emergency, and are also routinely allocated to dive with complete strangers who may be using unfamiliar equipment. It is standard practice for many, if not most diving charter organisations to allocate buddy pairs among divers they have never assessed for competence on the basis of their certification and claimed experience. Optimal conditions are seldom encountered on open-water recreational dives.

=== Alternatives ===
The three alternatives, solo diving, diving in teams of three, and diving as an individual in a large group, may have disadvantages when compared to the buddy system, especially for the novice:

Although solo diving is practiced by some recreational divers, it is only considered acceptably safe if the diver is totally self-sufficient. This usually entails a completely redundant gas supply, such as a bailout bottle or isolation-manifolded twin cylinders, and the competence to use it in an emergency. Self-rescue is not possible in some cases, such as severe cases of entrapment in ropes and nets and during medical emergencies where the diver loses consciousness or is otherwise severely impaired in their ability to respond appropriately. A considerably higher standard of competence is generally required of solo divers, even taking into account the differences due to the absence of a buddy, as can be seen by comparing minimum standards for Solo Diver and Autonomous diver certification.

Three diver teams can be effective for safety and backup, as generally, a problem that requires assistance affects only one diver, and having two divers to assist can be helpful. However, this procedure requires a considerably greater level of attention to group coherence. It is usually used by technical divers in cave and wreck penetration diving, where the advantages are sufficient to compensate for the added task loading, and the divers are competent to manage the additional complexity.

The system of group diving, where a group of tourists are taken on a sightseeing tour of a dive site by a dive leader and "sheepdog" assistant, who brings up the rear and herds the stragglers, is often practiced when the visibility is sufficient for it to be practicable. The divers in such groups may be entirely unfamiliar with each other. In this system, especially in large groups, poor visibility or strong currents, the weak, inexperienced, or inattentive individual divers can easily become detached from the group and lose the protection of stronger or more competent divers in the group. Communication is often difficult in these groups leading to increased risk, but the client divers are not left with sole responsibility for a stranger of unknown competence. The "sheepdog" assistant is given the responsibility of being buddy to all the divers in the group, while not having a buddy of their own.

In professional diving, a working diver is supported by a diving team, which will include a standby diver ready to go to the assistance of the working diver.

== History ==
Scuba diving has roots in the many small and enthusiastic snorkelling and spearfishing clubs in the decades just before and after the Second World War. After the invention of the "aqualung" by Cousteau and Gagnan, the first commercially manufactured underwater breathing apparatus became available for sale for recreational purposes in the late 1940s. As the new sport of scuba diving rapidly expanded through the 1950s, several organisations—notably the YMCA—began programmes to train swimming enthusiasts in this new aquatic pastime, and began to codify what they believed were proper practises for this expanding sport. The YMCA considered the buddy system a useful corollary to the "never swim alone" rule of their swimming and lifesaving programmes. Cousteau himself independently implemented a buddy system from the earliest days of exploratory diving after a number of harrowing diving incidents. The buddy system did have some useful aspects: cross checking of equipment before dives, facilitating assistance for possible entanglement problems or equipment failures, and enhancement of the social nature of diving. The YMCA remained a major force in the development of diver certification for the first 50 years of the sport. When these programmes were adopted by the emerging scuba certification agencies such as NAUI, PADI, and BS-AC, buddy diving developed into one of the two most widely known rules of the activity: "Never hold your breath," and "Never dive alone."

The official terminology of recreational diving defines only the two extremes: buddy/team diving, and solo diving. In practice, many dives are somewhere between these extremes, in a continuum with some informal descriptors, and many behaviours deviate from the buddy diving standard.

== Scuba procedures ==
=== Pairing of buddies ===
Opinions differ in how best to form buddy teams among a group of divers. One school of thought holds that buddies should always be closely matched in skills, experience, and interests so that one diver does not hold back the other in achieving an enjoyable dive. This becomes particularly true when a diver is on an especially expensive or unique diving trip or holiday. This is a suitable arrangement for purely recreational dives. The problem with this approach is that it also pairs up inexperience – which can be dangerous if a diving emergency arises (fortunately, this is not statistically very often). The alternative is to buddy-up a more experienced diver with a less experienced buddy to counter this "experience gap". This also helps to advance diving skills by having one buddy essentially act as a tutor. The British Sub Aqua Club strongly encourages and practices this approach, which is appropriate in a club environment where non-instructing members assist in post-certification training. The problems with this system, are that they may limit the more experienced diver's opportunity to dive as he would have wished, and that the less experienced diver is not an ideal buddy to the more experienced diver, who must take an unbalanced share of responsibility, and this constitutes an informal training scenario. Compatibility problems are magnified when divers who do not know one another are paired off as buddies by the dive operator. Numerous harrowing stories abound about diving with "the tail-end-Charlie" or the "buddy from hell" out of such practices. The "perfect buddy" is a long term friend or acquaintance, a partner who matches one's own high level of diving skills, who has the same interests, the same stamina and fitness, and who enjoys the companionship in sharing enjoyable diving. Although the principal reason for instituting the buddy system is the mitigation of the risks in diving, the sharing of diving experiences and the enjoyment of being paired together with a friend, family member, or keen fellow enthusiast while on a dive ranks very highly in the reasons many divers enjoy the recreation of scuba diving.

=== Equipment use and tasks within the buddy team ===
The buddy system is expected to provide a level of redundancy within the pair of divers, as a safety backup in case of any equipment failure. Within the overall buddy pair almost all equipment can be seen as part of a combined "redundant system": two tanks, two depth gauges/ dive computers, two lights, two knives or line-cutters, – even two brains. During the dive, measurement instruments (gauges, dive computers, compass, etc.) are available to cross-check one another, a second set of life support equipment (i.e. gas supply) is there as a backup in case of a failure in one of the divers' systems. Sometimes a single special-purpose but non-critical piece of equipment is shared by the buddy team, like a single deployable surface marker buoy on which to ascend and mark the team's position or a single underwater metal detector. For the system to work effectively, a buddy team must have a shared and agreed dive plan, and both divers must accept the responsibilities of executing it. The plan will specify the basic parameters of the dive such as maximum depth, route, duration, critical breathing gas pressures and decompression plan, who will lead and who follows, buddy separation procedures, etc. and the dive objectives: is it general sightseeing, to view a wreck, photography, hunting a type of game?. In technical diving, these objectives often become much more complex and very specific – penetration of a particular part of a cave to a particular point. Many diving objectives require allocation of specific roles and responsibilities. For example, in lobster hunting on the west coast of America, buddy teams often split into assigned roles of hunter-game catcher, and stower-catchbag carrier, and overall dive success depends on teamwork and carrying out assigned roles.

=== Provision of emergency breathing gas ===
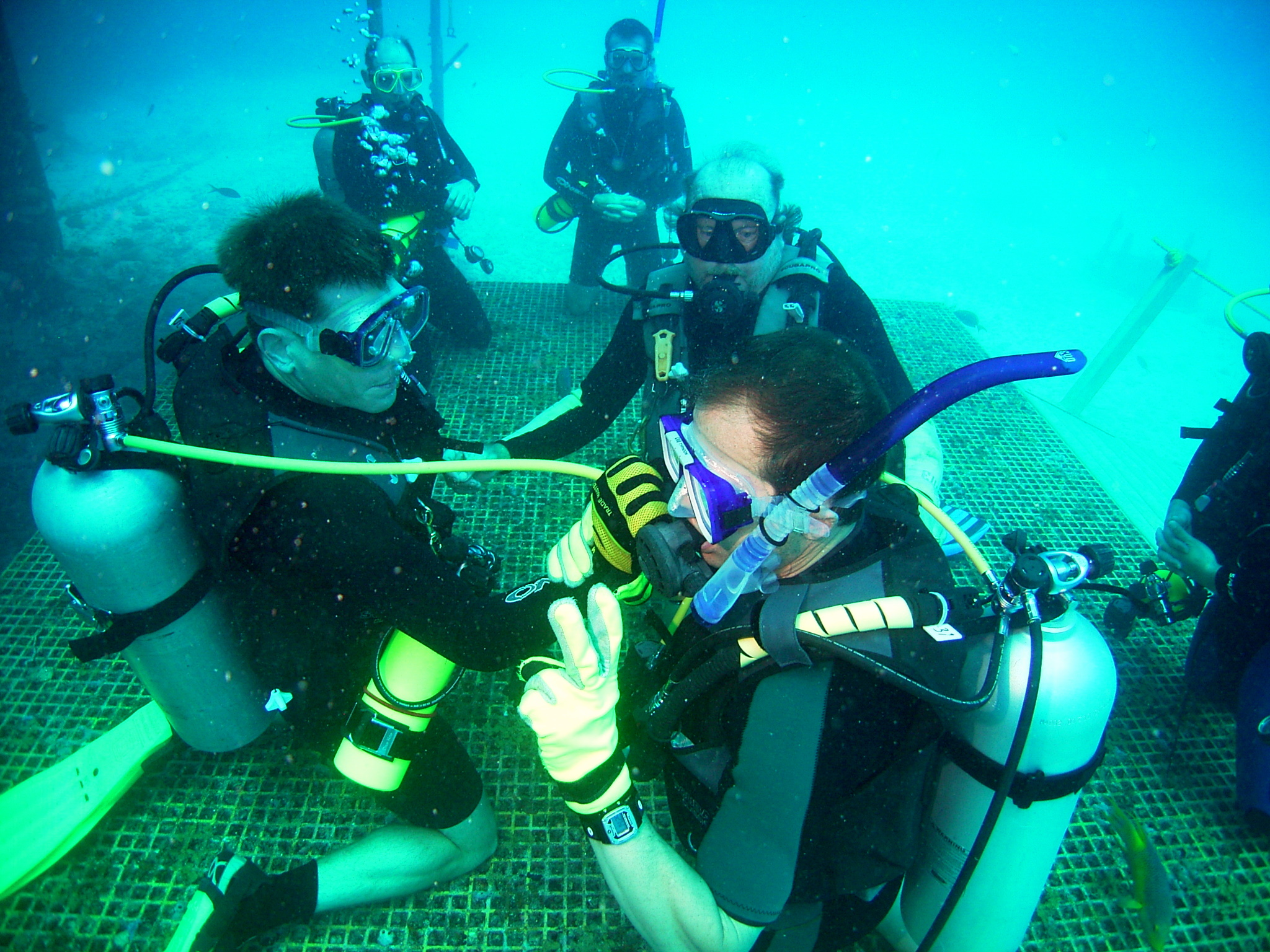
Scuba divers practicing buddy breathing technique during formal training

An important aspect of the buddy function is providing breathing gas in an out of air (OOA) emergency. This can happen in the event of a regulator failure or using up most of the breathing gas while inattentive, distracted, or dealing with an urgent problem. Part of an effective buddy system is preventing and avoiding out of air emergencies by effective gas management, and effectively managing emergencies when they do occur in spite of diligent monitoring.

In the early years of scuba, each diver carried a single second-stage regulator, and in the case of an out of air emergency, the buddy pair made an emergency ascent to the surface while the two divers took turns buddy breathing from the mouthpiece of the remaining functional scuba set. Though this system worked effectively enough in a swimming pool or in open water practice sessions, and sometimes worked for skilled and disciplined divers in actual emergencies, in some cases stress and physical difficulties made it fail.

To simplify the procedure for air sharing, the recreational diving industry moved to a configuration that provided each diver an additional second-stage regulator, as a backup to the primary. The backup is known variously as the octopus stage, backup, secondary, or (obsolescent) safe second. The term octopus came about because several regulator and other hoses hanging from the first stage made the unit look a bit like an octopus. Two general systems have evolved for carrying and deploying the backup demand valve—one more prevalent in recreational diving and the other commonly found in technical diving (although some crossover exists). In both systems, each diver carries two demand valves. They may be attached to the first-stage regulator of a single tank or to two first stage regulators of twin cylinders or a single cylinder wit a dual outlet valve. The primary regulator is for normal breathing during the dive, and the secondary regulator ("octopus") is a backup for oneself or an out-of-air buddy.

Two basic procedures are in common use: Donating the primary and donating the octopus.

==== Donating the primary ====
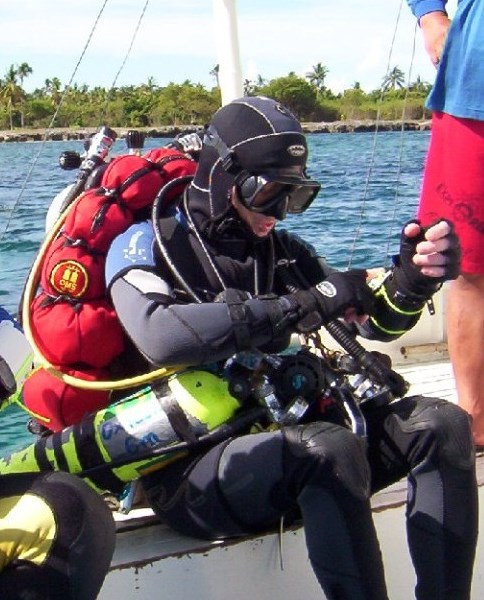
The long hose - note looping about divers neck

A system recommended by some organisations, mostly those involved in technical diving (GUE, CMAS-ISA, other tech and cave diving groups) is to equip the regulator normally used throughout the dive (the "primary") with a long hose, typically 1.5 to 2 metres (5 to 7 ft) long, proportional to the height of the diver. This is the regulator that is donated to a diver who is out of air. The "secondary" or "backup" regulator is then reserved for the donor diver and is on a short hose, suspended just under the chin by a "necklace" that can break free in an emergency. The principal advantage is that the diver who is in trouble receives a regulator that is known to be working and provides breathing gas appropriate for the current depth—and quite possibly gets air more quickly than if the clipped off octopus were donated. Donation of the long hose is particularly beneficial for cave and wreck penetration diving where divers sharing air may need to pass through small openings, as the hose length lets them swim in single file where necessary. The length of the hose also allows the divers to swim side-by-side or one above the other in all possible arrangements. Another advantage is that the secondary regulator stows out of the way, protected from strong water flow, contamination and snags, and where the diver can notice if it leaks—but remains accessible without requiring the use of hands, as divers can pick up the mouthpiece by dipping their chin. This arrangement is slightly more cumbersome to use and requires greater skill to wear, deploy and recover. Benefits may not outweigh disadvantages for open water divers in relatively low hazard conditions.

==== Donating the octopus ====
The recreational octopus - note color and placement in "Golden Triangle"

The octopus is usually clearly marked, the convention is a yellow hose and yellow second stage though a luminescent green is sometimes favoured. Many dive equipment manufacturers provide secondary regulators marked exactly to this standard and "tune" them specifically to the role of octopus. The octopus second stage is usually stowed in an easily located, accessible position and is easily detachable from the device that holds it. Most recreational agencies recommend or specify that this position be in the "Golden Triangle" drawn between a divers chin and nipples. The octopus hose is usually made long enough (1.2 metres (4 ft)) so that the divers are not inconveniently crowded against one another when the octopus regulator is in use. The procedure to provide the octopus is that the donor diver hands over the octopus—but if a buddy does not notice the buddy's distress, the out-of-air diver has been taught to take the stowed octopus. An advantage with this method is that donor handover is consistent in both octopus handover and for handover of any independent bailout device such as a removable pony bottle. As part of pre-dive checks, the team should review the procedure for handing-over or accessing the octopus in out-of-air emergency. In recreational diving, if good gas management practice has been followed, either buddy should have sufficient air for both to safely ascend to the surface, even if the emergency occurs at the end of the dive. This may not be the case where an unplanned decompression obligation exists.

=== Standardisation of configurations as a safety advantage ===
It is helpful if divers wear their equipment in a way that follows standardised conventions so that buddy partners know where to access that equipment if called on to assist their buddy. As there are several conventions, and divers who do not follow locally popular conventions, it is important for divers planning to dive as buddies to familiarise themselves with the configuration used by the other in the pre-dive checks.

=== Communication between buddies ===
Diving takes place in what Cousteau called "The Silent World." The relative silence of the sea is one of the enjoyable aspects of scuba diving, but does not help foster natural means of communication within a buddy team. If they haven't invested in expensive full-face masks that incorporate through-water voice transmission, buddy divers must communicate via non-audible means: standardized hand signals or submersible writing slates.

==== Hand signals ====
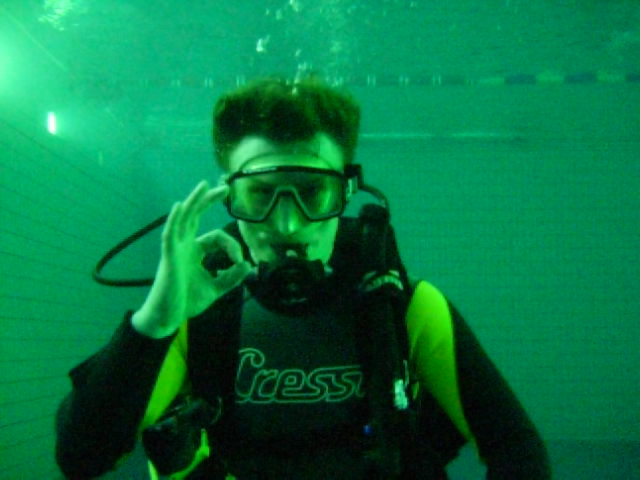
Diving signal ok

In an effort to insure universal, easily understood signals between divers, the Recreational Scuba Training Council agencies together defined a set of hand signals intended for universal use, which are taught to diving students early in their entry-level diving courses. Hand signals may also have more than one variation that may benefit when one hand is occupied, or in limited visibility. In darkness it may be necessary to illuminate the hand signal for it to be understandable.

==== Underwater slates ====
Underwater slates are useful when there is more detailed information to communicate or remember. A large variety of designs are available. Some clip to the divers BCD, some fit into pockets, some integrated with other units such as the compass and some attach to the wrist or forearm with bungee straps. The basic parts comprise just an underwater pencil attached to a plastic board by a short tether, and a way to attach these to a convenient point on the diver's equipment. Slates are particularly useful for information that must be written down prior to a dive and referenced during the dive: elements of the dive plan (depths, durations, decompression schedule) or a drawn map of the dive area.

==== Buddy lines ====
A buddy line is a line or strap physically tethering two scuba divers together underwater to avoid separation in low visibility conditions. A buddy line is commonly a short length of about two meters with a floating element between divers to reduce risk of snagging on the bottom. A buddy line is a means of communication. It doesn't need to be particularly strong or secure, but should not pull off under moderate loads. Divers may communicate by rope signals, but more usually just use the line to attract attention before moving closer and communicating by hand signals. The disadvantage of a buddy line is an increased risk of snagging and entanglement. Divers may need to disconnect the line quickly at either end in an emergency, which is done via a quick release mechanism or by cutting the line, both of which require at least one free hand. A velcro strap requires no tools for release and can be released under tension.

==== Other communication methods ====
In more advanced diving (particularly penetration diving) divers often use additional underwater communication methods, including signalling with lights, pulls along connecting lines, or tapping on tanks.

Ultrasonic signalling devices that attract the buddy's attention by vibration have been marketed and may have some limited utility.

=== Buddy separation procedure ===
The generally accepted procedure in the case of buddy separation (or lost buddy), in a recreational open water dive is to search for the buddy for one minute, and if not found in this time, to start the ascent, following appropriate procedures based on any decompression obligations. This rule is taught fairly consistently by recreational diver training agencies, but it is not compulsory and variations in this procedure may be agreed upon by the divers during dive planning. Compliance is variable, as ascent in most cases implies termination of the dive, which may not be welcome to either party. Loss of buddy contact is commonly reported in diving fatalities, but in many cases it is not clear whether loss of contact was a cause or an effect of the fatal incident. In overhead diving, the team member separated from the guide line is considered lost, as the guide line is the means of finding the way out, and the procedure is different.

== Situational awareness ==
The time to help a buddy is before the situation degrades to an accident. Awareness of the status of the buddy and their equipment can allow a problem to be fixed before it endangers anyone. A diver can sometimes notice things that are indications that all is not well even before the dive. This works where the buddy pair are familiar with each other and their equipment, but there are things that can alert a diver to a problem even with a stranger.

== Freediving procedures ==
The role of a freediving buddy can vary depending on the type of dive, but the highest risk to freedivers is shallow water blackout from latent hypoxia which almost always occurs within the last 5 metres when surfacing or at the surface. A dive buddy can prevent almost all freediving fatalities by meeting the diver below this depth range and escorting them to the surface, provided that they know how to recognise a blackout and know how to protect the diver's airway while bringing them to the surface.

When diving on a shotline, the buddy may be expected to meet the diver at a specified depth during the ascent, to ensure that the diver makes it back to the surface safely. The reason for this is that the highest risk of blackout is on the final approach to the surface, where reducing ambient pressure causes latent hypoxia to drop the blood oxygen tension rapidly. The buddy will be ready to perform a rescue during this ascent and at the surface until the diver has reoxygenated. It requires some experience to know when to start the descent so the diver will be met at the right depth.

Spearfishers may use a two up one down system which is efficient for allowing a diver to be underwater almost all the time. In this protocol, while one diver is diving, the second is breathing up while acting as the safety diver. The third diver is doing their recovery after their last dive. This system is good where longer recovery times are needed. The one up and one down system requires fewer divers and works well where the recovery times are shorter, however the safety diver needs to wait for long enough at the surface to be sure that the recently surfaced diver will not black out before starting their own dive.

== Responsibility ==
With buddy diving, each of the divers is presumed to have a responsibility to the other. The actual legal responsibilities for recreational buddies may vary between jurisdictions and are seldom if ever clear. The buddies are expected to monitor each other, to stay close enough together to help in an emergency, to behave safely and to follow the plan agreed by the group before the dive. When the system fails, it is generally because one of the divers does not fulfill his or her responsibilities as a buddy. If one of the divers is incapable of providing the expected assistance the buddy system has already failed. With professional divers, buddy responsibility may vary and will be specified in the code of practice, operations manual, and dive plan. Each diver in this case must be capable of fulfilling their responsibilities according to the dive plan.

The responsibilities of each buddy during a recreational dive are generally accepted to be:

- Forming an agreed dive plan (dive objective, course to follow, depth limits and distance from exit point), agreeing on air pressure at which the dive is terminated and ascent started, who leads and who follows, and reviewing possible emergency measures
- Helping a buddy get in and out of their equipment, particularly in assisting donning of heavier items of diving equipment and adjusting hard to reach items
- Checking the buddy's equipment setup before the dive to assure that it is complete, in proper working order and configuration prior to the dive
- Keeping track of the other buddy and staying together for the entire dive – maintaining a separation that can be closed up within only a couple of seconds
- Maintaining active communication throughout the dive by hand signals and regular monitoring of each other's gauges—and checking that the buddy is okay with the conditions and progress of the dive via such hand signals
- Managing dive duration and profile by following the most limiting conditions indicated by the gauges and dive computers
- If separation does occur, searching to reestablish contact with the buddy for the agreed period, commonly one minute, and if that fails safely returning to the surface to re-establish contact. This may effectively terminate the dive. Further action if the buddy does not surface within a similar time-span depends on the circumstances, but may involve raising the alarm for a lost diver and initiating a search.
- In the case of a dive emergency, assisting a buddy to extricate from the danger—particularly in the case of entanglement, out of air situations, or rescue assistance for an immobilized or unresponsive buddy
- The primary responsibility of a diver is for their own safety. Circumstances may occur in which adherence to the buddy system puts a diver at unacceptable risk to their life or health, at which point the buddy system ceases to be advantageous and should be abandoned. An example tested by law occurred when a diver with decompression obligations did not follow their buddy to the surface during an emergency ascent during which the ascending diver died. The appeal court found that the buddy had acted as a reasonable person.

These responsibilities may not be legally binding. A recreational diver is not normally expected to take unacceptable risks to their own safety to assist another recreational diver, and it is not reasonable to expect performance of skills in which the diver has not been trained or assessed.

The US Navy does not require buddy diving in all circumstances, but it does specify that buddy divers are responsible for both the assigned task and each other's safety. They must:

- maintain contact by keeping the dive partner in sight or if the visibility is poor, by using a buddy line.
- know the meaning of all hand and line-pull signals.
- acknowledge signals immediately and assume that the failure of a buddy to respond indicates an emergency.
- monitor the activity and apparent condition of the buddy, and if it appears abnormal, investigate the cause and take immediate appropriate action.
- never leave the buddy unless the buddy is trapped or entangled and cannot be freed without additional assistance. In this case, the diver must mark the position of the distressed diver with a line and float or other locating device.
- have a lost-diver plan for every dive, and follow the plan if contact is broken.
- if one member of a dive team aborts a dive, for any reason, the other member must also abort and both must surface, and
- know the proper method of buddy breathing.

Other professional divers' buddy responsibilities are likely to be similar and should be clearly described in the operations manual.

== Problems of the buddy system ==
With the increased popularity of solo diving as a possible alternative to the buddy system, there has been debate as to what really constitutes safe diving practise and how divers can best control the risks associated with their sport. Statistically speaking, scuba is a reasonably safe activity, with incidents of injury below several other "risk" sports such as football, horse riding or even tennis. Yet unlike these other sports, scuba divers are in a hostile environment for which humans are not adapted, breathing from a portable and limited capacity life support system. Under these conditions, fatality is always a possible outcome, as even simple equipment or procedural problems can be mishandled. In dealing with this reality a number of major concerns about potentially inherent flaws or negative impacts that can exist within the buddy system have been identified. Few, if any, of these problems, are defects in the concept of the buddy system, they are problems with the application of the system.

Every time I read, in an accident [sic] report, that the buddy system failed, I get livid. The buddy system does not fail, it is the people using it that have the problems. The system is fine, it is the implementation that falls down.

— Glen Egstrom, Emergency air sharing

There are circumstances in which the buddy system must be abandoned as unacceptably risky to the buddy. The buddy should not be expected or legally obliged to unduly put themself at risk of death or serious injury in the attempt to rescue a diver in distress. The level of risk acceptable has been determined in some legislations to be that acceptable to the reasonable man. A conviction of criminal negligence made by a magistrate on Malta was overthrown by the appeals judge on these grounds, among others.

The amount of discipline, effort, and attention needed from both divers in a buddy pair, and the even greater input required in a three diver team, is unattractive to a confident diver who has other things to do during a straightforward, low risk, recreational dive, and the system is undermined when any one of the divers fails to put in the effort, putting the burden on the remaining diver who takes the responsibilities more seriously. Familiarity with the environment and the very low incidence of life-threatening accidents is likely to lead to a confidence that there won't be a problem on any given dive, so the divers may pay less attention to good buddy practices, and this may become habitual. This may be exacerbated by the divers being strangers thrown together by chance and the whims of the divemaster, who have no real interest in each other, and whose reasons to dive may be incompatible. Pairing an explorer with a macro photographer often annoys at least one, probably both, if they comply with recommended buddy diving practices. Many nominally buddy dives effectively become solo dives soon after entering the water, with the buddies occasionally checking for the presence of each other and often being beyond direct view of each other. In spite of this, very few of these divers die as a consequence.

The main charge made against the buddy system as practiced is that it has been grossly overrated as a means of risk mitigation. Critics say that the buddy system acts as a crutch to give unjustified confidence to divers who individually do not have either the skills or the discipline to adequately deal with any real diving problems. This creates a situation where divers become dependent on the "security blanket" of being with another diver. The reality may be that the buddy diver on whom many divers depend is often no better able to handle an emergency than the dependent buddy. The fostering of this false security by diving agencies that overemphasise the effectiveness of the buddy system, develops a sense of complacency in divers about their capability to deal with these problems, a capability which they often do not have. This complacency holds divers back from focusing on improving their lifesaving skills and capabilities.

Critics state that the proponents of the buddy system project the image of a "totally reliable buddy" that does not, in fact, exist in reality. Some buddies lack skills or experience, some are unfit and some are physically incapable of safely performing a rescue on their buddy. The major problem is that certain diver personality types are outright dangers; these types have been described as " the untrained diver", "the high-flyer", "the falsely confident diver", "the angry diver", or "the buddy from hell". The bad buddy problem is compounded by training that compels a diver to "stick with his buddy" no matter what, leading to the situation that it is the bad buddy who sets the criteria of how (badly) the dive is carried out. Both the solo diving and the buddy diving community have come to a similar conclusion on how to best address the issues of safety in both systems – self-sufficiency. In the buddy system, this means that both divers are capable of looking after themselves and sorting out almost any problems, but they still dive together as a backup to further enhance their safety as well as to share and enjoy their diving experience.

Divers are more likely to attempt a dive they are uneasy with if they feel they would let the buddy down if they canceled.

Given the emphasis on the requirement that all buddy divers be able to aid their buddy in an emergency, over the last decade there have been some agency-approved diving practices established where certain types of buddies do not actually meet this criterion. This is evident in the practice of scuba diving for children. Initiated by PADI, in an effort to expand scuba diving into the realm of becoming a "family activity" like skiing, the certification of children has been adopted by other recreational diving agencies with their own diving programmes for children (RSTC minimum age for certification is 15 years). These typically include two levels, depending on the child's age. PADI has six courses/levels for children, in which a child from the age of 10 can become a buddy diver in open water situations. The other buddy in this team can be a certified parent or a dive professional. Serious concerns have been expressed about this general policy of having child buddies, among the concerns is the mental anguish and psychological damage that may be caused to a child who fails to rescue a buddy parent. The first child buddy death in British waters occurred in 2008. The first double fatality of a buddy pair in which one diver was a minor occurred with a British father and son in Gozo in 2006. Proponents of dive training for children point to the great enjoyment and sense of wonderment the children feel when introduced to the underwater world and point out that other family sporting activities also have unfortunate incidents of serious injury to children.

=== Liability of the diving buddy ===
Liability issues strongly affect the structure of the diving industry, its organisation and even the implementation of recommended diving practices – and this is very much the case with buddy diving. Diving is a risky sport, where serious accidents occasionally occur. In an increasingly litigious world, accidents often trigger a search for "blame", and aspersions of blame often trigger ensuing litigation. It is a natural thing for those who may face the potential risks of litigation to take measures to mitigate these risks. Diving certification agencies must necessarily insure themselves against liability risks and must act to minimise the cost of this insurance for both themselves and their operatives. The buddy system, beneficial as it can be in enhancing diver safety, has the legal effect of creating an involved intermediary person between the certifying agency and any injured party, an intermediary who could be easily identified as not having provided "duty of care" if an accident occurs. This may afford a legal cushion for the agency, or trainer, or boat - but it is not exactly good news for someone acting in the role of a buddy. The more skilled the buddy partner, the more these duties of care may be assumed to increase, often without legal justification.

Liability waivers are signed whenever a diver interacts with an operative of the diving industry, e.g. the training agent or dive boat. No such waiver is commonplace for the buddy in a buddy team. As case law develops, more precedents become established for situations where buddy action may make them particularly liable. It has been recommended by DAN-SA that buddy divers carry insurance that provides coverage of themselves against legal actions by buddies, particularly if diving takes place in those countries where a culture of litigation may exist. This is particularly necessary for scuba diving professionals who earn a living in the recreational diving industry, when they "buddy-up". More experienced or more qualified divers may also unreasonably be expected to bear a higher duty of care for their less qualified buddies, and therefore a serious burden can be placed on a vacationing diver asked to buddy up with a stranger, especially in litigious jurisdictions, and specially if either diver is not as competent as their certification and experience may suggest.

According to a US law firm, it is necessary to establish fault in any liability claim. There are four conditions that must be proved to establish a claim for negligence: That there was a duty of care, that there was a breach of that duty, that there was harm caused by that breach of duty, and that a value can be attributed to the damage caused by that harm. Different conditions may apply in other jurisdictions.

== Training, competence and certification ==
Buddy diving skills appropriate to each level of certification are included in the training standards, and should be included in the training and assessment for that certification, building on the skills required for the relevant prerequisite certification, which should be already in place.

== See also ==
- Buddy breathing – Technique for sharing breathing gas from a single mouthpiece
- Buddy check – Pre-dive safety checks carried out by two-diver dive teams
- Buddy system – Procedure in which two people operate together as a single unit
- Civil liability in recreational diving – Legal duty of care, negligence and liability in recreational diving
- Dive leader – Recreational diving certification and role
- Dive planning – Process of planning an underwater diving operation
- Diving procedures – Standard underwater diving protocols
- Diving safety – Risk management of underwater diving activities
- Diving team – Group of people working together to enhance dive safety and achieve a task
- Duty of care – Type of legal obligation
- Rescue Diver – Recreational scuba certification emphasising emergency response and diver rescue
- Solo diving – Recreational diving without a dive buddy
- Standby diver – Diver who is ready to go to the assistance of the working diver
