= American Canadian Underwater Certifications =

Recreational diver training and certification agency

ACUC American & Canadian Underwater Certifications, Inc.
- Abbreviation: ACUC
- Predecessor: Association of Canadian Underwater Councils
- Formation: 1986
- Headquarters: Ontario, Canada
- Official language: English, French, Spanish
- President: Juan Rodriguez
- Affiliations: RSTC Canada; RSTC Europe
- Website: https://acucinternational.com

ACUC, American and Canadian Underwater Certifications Inc. is an international recreational diving membership and diver training organization. Formerly known as the Association of Canadian Underwater Councils, it was formed as a not for profit collective of regional dive councils to create a national forum for their common interest and concerns. It soon began developing a training curriculum better suited to the Canadian conditions that many other training agencies neglected. It was later incorporated in 1986 in Canada by Robert Cronkwright. Cronkwright was a National Association of Underwater Instructors (NAUI) instructor from 1969 to 1971. In 1971 he crossed over to the Association of Canadian Underwater Councils and became a Training Director, Secretary/Treasurer and later Vice President of the Association (1972–1984). He was also Training Director for the Ontario Underwater Council (OUC) in the 1970s.

Cronkwright's long-time friend and ACUC Instructor Trainer Evaluator, Juan Rodriguez, purchased shares in the company in the mid-1990s. Since becoming an ACUC Instructor, Rodriguez was instrumental in expanding ACUC's business interests in the global marketplace. In May 2003 Juan Rodriguez became the sole owner and President when Cronkwright retired. Nancy Cronkwright, Cronkwright's daughter, continues as vice president and Director of the corporation. She has been with the company since its beginning in 1986, and she was Office Manager for the Association of Canadian Underwater Councils (1982–1986).

== Corporate offices and delegate offices ==
ACUC's corporate head offices are divided into two regions. North America head office is in Ontario, Canada. Eur-Asia head office is in Madrid, Spain.

ACUC has numerous delegate offices worldwide, including Argentina, Latin America, Cuba, India, Italy/Croatia & Italian Switzerland, and South Korea.

== Associations and standards development ==
ACUC is a member of RSTC Canada and RSTC Europe. Juan Rodriguez is a technical advisor for AENOR (Spanish Association for Standardisation and Certification) and Nancy Cronkwright is a technical advisor for the SCC (Standards Council of Canada). The company is working with AENOR and SCC in the development of ISO - TC228 recreational diving standards.

== Training system ==
The ACUC training system is composed of theory and practical training modules. Students learn the theoretical aspects of the program directly from an ACUC instructor supplemented with training manuals, handouts, presentations, and videos. Practical training is provided in a pool or confined water environment by a certified ACUC instructor. Students are certified once they have completed a theory exam and practical evaluation. Practical evaluations are performed in the open water by a certified ACUC instructor. The number of dives required for practical evaluation and instructor-to-student ratios are based on the current ACUC standard for the level of certification.

ACUC training courses range from "Snorkel Diving" and entry levels such as "Scuba Diver" and "Open Water Diver" to "Master Diver", as well as numerous specialty diver programs. Leadership level programs start from "Divemaster", and progress to "Instructor Trainer Evaluator", which is the highest level within the ACUC training ladder. Through affiliation with LifeGuard Systems, based in Shokan, New York, USA, they also provide public safety diving and surface ice rescue certifications used by numerous fire and police service groups internationally.

The company also has a long-standing agreement with the Canadian Forces and the Spanish National Guard to recognize numerous military dive training programs and provide equivalent civilian dive certification cards for military personnel in Canada and Spain.

== Recreational diving levels ==
=== Snorkel diving ===
- Snorkel Diver Level I - Beginner award
- Snorkel Diver Level II - Intermediate award
- Snorkel Diver Level III - Advanced award
- Snorkel Diver Level IV - Leadership award

=== Entry level diver programs ===
- Scuba Experience (non-certification program)
- Scuba Diver (supervised diver)
- Open Water Diver

=== Advanced level diver programs ===
- Nitrox Diver
- Advanced Diver
- Rescue Diver

=== Entry level and intermediate diver specialty programs ===
- Night Diving
- Underwater Navigation
- Deep Diving (40 meters/130 feet)
- Underwater Photography
- Wreck Diving (non penetration)
- Underwater Archeology
- Dry Suit Diving
- Cavern Diving

=== Advanced level diver specialty programs ===
- Dive Guide
- Teaching Assistant
- Wreck Penetration
- Technical Deep Diving/Advanced Decompression
- Ice Diving
- Cave Diving

=== Non-diver specialty programs ===
- First Aid Provider
- Surface Controller
- Equipment Maintenance
- Visual Inspection Technician

=== Additional specialties ===
In addition to the certifications listed above, ACUC instructors may apply to ACUC for approval to teach their own distinctive specialty programs.

== Leadership level programs ==
- Divemaster
- Snorkel Diving Instructor
- Assistant Instructor
- Entry Level Instructor
- Open Water Instructor
- Advanced Instructor
- Instructor Trainer
- Instructor Trainer Evaluator
