= Professional Diving Instructors Corporation =

Recreational diver training and certification agency

- Abbreviation: PDIC
- Formation: 1969
- Type: NGO
- Purpose: Scuba Instructor training and recreational diving certification
- Location: 1623 W Jackson Street Muncie IN 47303 USA
- Region served: Global
- Website: http://www.pdic-intl.com/

The Professional Diving Instructors Corporation (PDIC) is an international SCUBA training and certification agency. It has an estimated 5 million active recreational divers.

Founded in 1969, PDIC was established out of the need to properly train SCUBA instructors. After more than ten years of training exclusively instructors, the decision was made to offer training starting at the open water level.

PDIC is a founding member of the (United States) Recreational Scuba Training Council and is recognised as a scuba training and certification provider by several state and national organisations in the USA.
