= World Recreational Scuba Training Council =

Scuba diving standards body

- Abbreviation: WRSTC
- Formation: 1999
- Type: INGO
- Purpose: Development of worldwide minimum training standards
- Headquarters: PO Box 11083, Jacksonville, FL 32239-1083 USA
- Region served: Global
- Members: Regional & National RSTCs
- Website: www.wrstc.com

The World Recreational Scuba Training Council (WRSTC) was founded in 1999 and is dedicated to creating minimum recreational diving training standards for the various recreational scuba diving certification agencies across the world. The WRSTC restricts its membership to national or regional councils. These councils consist of individual training organizations who collectively represent at least 50% of the annual diver certifications in the member council's country or region. A national council is referred to as a RSTC (Recreational Scuba Training Council).

Significant training organisations which are not associated with WRSTC via membership of its regional RSTCs include Confédération Mondiale des Activités Subaquatiques (CMAS).

== Member Councils ==
=== United States RSTC ===
On the basis of the experience of past attempts within the United States (US) to control various aspects of recreational diving activity by legislation, the US RSTC was created in 1986 as a permanent body to sustain a relationship between various recreational diving training organisations. In 1991, it replaced the Diving Equipment Manufacturers Association (DEMA) (renamed as the Diving Equipment and Marketing Association in 1998) as the secretariat for the then American National Standards Institute (ANSI) committee for Underwater Safety (also known as the Z86 Committee). The Z86 committee was subsequently replaced by the committee for Diving Instructional Standards and Safety (also known as the Z375 committee). In 2007 it retained its appointment as the ANSI Accredited Standards Developer (ASD) for the Z375 committee.

The US RSTC has been responsible for the development of a standard medical statement (in conjunction with the Undersea and Hyperbaric Medical Society) and minimum training standards for diving hand signals and the following recreational diver grades - Introductory Scuba Experience, Supervised Diver, Open Water Diver, Enriched Air Nitrox Certification, Entry level Rescue Diver, Dive Supervisor, Assistant Instructor, Scuba Instructor and Scuba Instructor Trainer.

In 2020 the revised 'RSTC Medical Declaration Form' and 'Notes for Physicians' (diving medical guidance) were published, following a three-year review by the 'Diver Medical Screen Committee'. (DMSC) comprises a team of internationally respected diving medicine experts; Dr Nick Bird, Dr Oliver Firth, (the late) Professor Tony Frew, Dr Alessandro Marroni, Professor Simon Mitchell, Associate Professor Neal Pollock and Dr Adel Taher.

Membership of a US RSTC council member is one of the recognition criteria used by Boy Scouts of America (BSA) for the selection of recreational scuba diving instructors for the training of its members in order to receive the BSA Scuba Diving merit badge.

As of 2025, the following agencies are members:

- IANTD - International Association of Nitrox and Technical Divers
- NAUI - National Association of Underwater Instructors
- PADI - Professional Association of Diving Instructors
- PDIC - The Professional Diving Instructors Corporation
- SDI - Scuba Diving International
- SEI - Scuba Educators International
- SSI - Scuba Schools International
- SNSI - Scuba and Nitrox Safety International
- RAID – Rebreather Association of International Divers
- NASE – National Academy of SCUBA Educators

=== RSTC Canada ===
The following agencies are currently members:

- ACUC Canada
- PADI Canada
- SDI North America

=== RSTC Europe ===
RSTC Europe currently is a member of the European Underwater Federation. The following agencies are currently members:

- ACUC International
- Divers Alert Network Europe
- International Aquanautic Club (IAC)
- International Diving Association
- International Disabled Divers Association
- IDEA Europe
- National Association of Scuba Diving Schools (NASDS)
- PADI EMEA
- Professional Diving Association
- Professional Scuba Schools
- SDI Germany
- Scuba Nitrox Safety International
- SSI Europe
- Verband Internationaler Tauchschulen

=== RSTC Japan ===
As of 2018, the following agencies were members:

- BSAC Japan
- National Association of Underwater Instructors
- PADI Japan
- SDI Japan
- SNSI Japan
- SSI Japan
