= Scuba Schools International =

Recreational scuba and freediving training and certification agency

- Abbreviation: SSI
- Formation: 1970
- Founder: Bob Clark, Ed Brawley, Jim Brown, Chuck Nicklin, Bud Smith
- Type: GmbH
- Legal status: Company
- Headquarters: Wendelstein, Germany
- Region served: Worldwide
- Official language: English, Arabic, Brazilian, Bulgarian, Catalan, Chinese-Simplified, Chinese-Traditional, Croatian, Czech, Danish, Dhivehi, Dutch, Farsi-Persian, Finnish, French, German, Greek, Hebrew, Hindi, Hungarian, Icelandic, Indonesian, Italian, Japanese, Korean, Malay, Norwegian, Polish, Portuguese, Romanian, Russian, Serbian, Slovak, Slovenian, Spanish, Swahili, Swedish, Tagalog, Thai, Turkish, Ukrainian, Vietnamese, Zulu
- Key people: Guido Waetzig - CEO
- Parent organization: HEAD NV
- Affiliations: the United States RSTC; RSTC Canada; RSTC Europe; C-Card Council (Japan); EUF
- Website: www.divessi.com

Scuba Schools International (SSI) Scuba Schools International (SSI) was established in 1970 with the vision of making it possible for anyone to learn how to dive safely. Today, SSI is the world's largest professional business-based training agency, with 4,000+ Training Centers and over 100,000 SSI Professionals in 150+ countries.

SSI offers training programmes in recreational scuba diving, extended-range diving, freediving, mermaid diving, swimming and lifeguarding. Its courses range from beginner to instructor-trainer level, with materials available in more than 40 languages.

== History ==
SSI was founded by Robert Clark in 1970. SSI headquarters was in Fort Collins, Colorado, and it is owned by Concept Systems International, Inc. In 2008, it was acquired by Doug McNeese, owner of the National Association of Scuba Diving Schools (USA) until its merger with SSI in 1999, and Robert Stoss, manager of Scubapro and Seemann Sub. On January 1, 2014, SSI was acquired by HEAD, which also includes the Mares brand of diving equipment, HEAD NV, for €4.9m. The current SSI headquarters is located in Wendelstein, Bavaria.

== Training ==
SSI offers internationally recognized recreational diver training programs - starting with snorkeling and entry level scuba diving courses up to instructor certifications. The most common programs are: SSI Open Water Diver (OWD) and Advanced Open Water Diver (AOWD). There are more than 30 different specialty courses. Dive leader training programs start with the Assistant Instructor followed by Open Water Instructor and above. SSI's training program for children aged 8–12 years is called SSI Explorers. The training program for technical divers is called Extended Range and includes decompression diving, trimix and other courses that exceed the limit for recreational divers. Furthermore, SSI offers courses in Freediving, Mermaiding, Swimming & Lifegaurd.

SSI scuba certifications are recognized throughout the world (such as RSTC - Recreational Scuba Training Council, EUF - European Underwater Federation, CUA - China Underwater Association and others).

The main difference to other dive training organizations is that SSI instructors are only allowed to teach at SSI Dive Centers or SSI accredited dive clubs that adopt a franchise-like concept.

SSI is a member of the following councils of the World Recreational Scuba Training Council - the United States RSTC (no longer listed on the RSTC website as a member of the US council as of June 25, 2026), the RSTC Europe and C-Card Council (Japan). It is also a member of the European Underwater Federation. SSI obtained CEN certification from the EUF certification body in 2005. It received their first ISO certification on June 1, 2010.

Current ISO-certified programs within SSI:

- ISO 11121 for Basic Diver
- ISO 24801-1 for Scuba Diver
- ISO 24801-2 for Open Water Diver
- ISO 24801-3 for Dive Guide
- ISO 21417 for SSI Marine Guide
- ISO 11107 for Enriched Air Nitrox
- ISO 13293 for Gas Blender
- ISO 24802-1 for Assistant Instructor
- ISO 24802-2 for Open Water Instructor
- ISO 13970 for Snorkel Instructor
- ISO 24804 for CCR Diving
- ISO 24805 for CCR Extended Range and CCR Extended Range Trimix
- ISO 24806 for CCR Technical Extended Range
- ISO 24807 for CCR Hypoxic Trimix
- ISO 24808 for CCR Instructor Levels

== Scuba & Extended Range Training ==
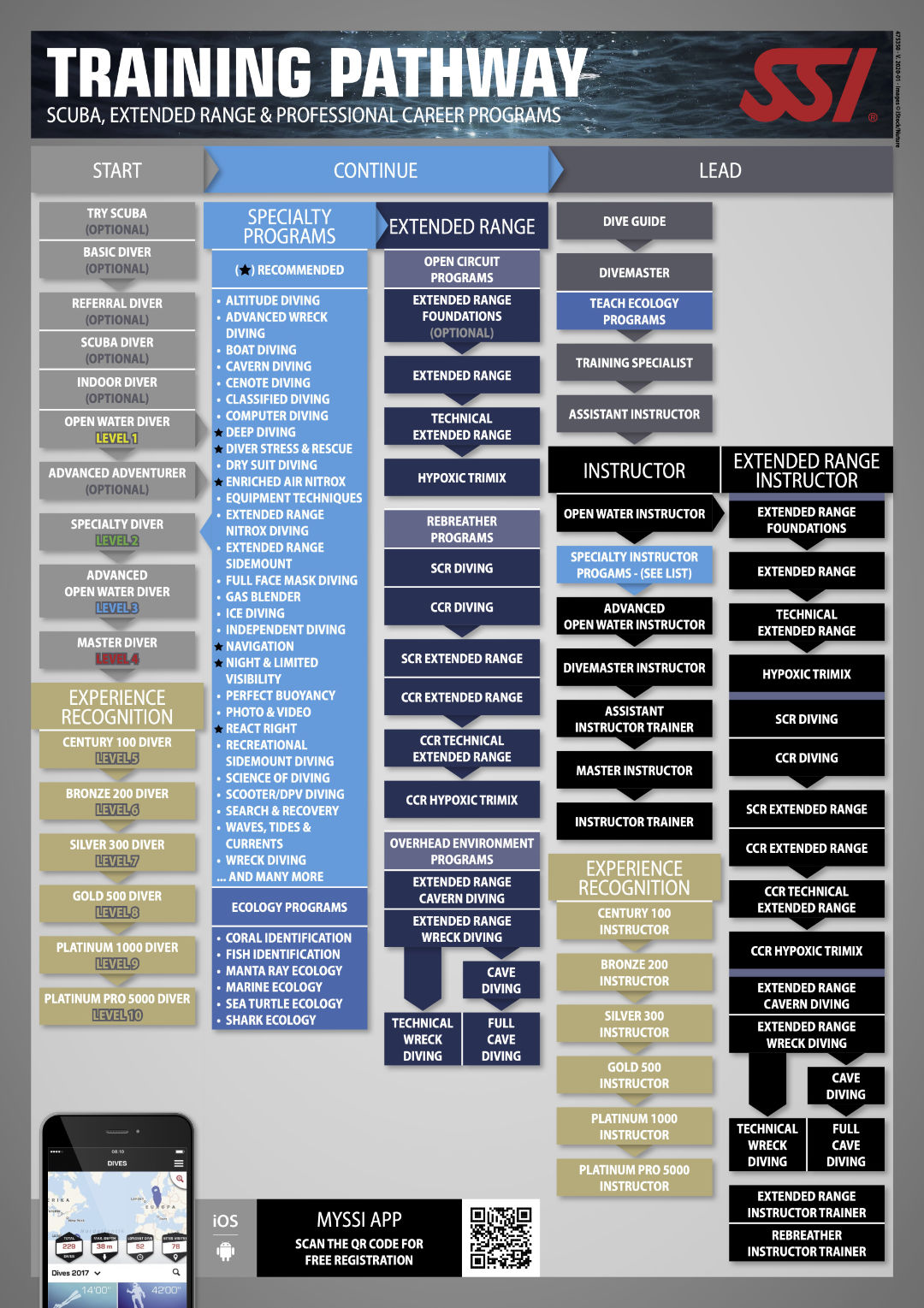

The SSI Training Standards outline the offered programs, their prerequisites and certification progression.

=== Non-certification programs ===
- Try Scuba

=== Entry-level scuba diving certification ===
In addition to the industry standard Open Water Diver (including Junior Open Water Diver for under 15s) qualification, SSI offers the following (which can be upgraded to Open Water certification with some additional training).

- Basic Diver (ISO 11121)
- Referral Diver
- Indoor Diver
- Scuba Diver (ISO 24801-1) (including Junior Scuba Diver for under 15s)

The Open Water Diver complies with Autonomous diver, ISO 24801-2. The Autonomous diver level is variously described as the best, and most popular, introductory scuba qualification.

=== Progression beyond Open Water ===
After Open Water certification, progression mainly depends on completing Scuba Specialty Programs and logging certain numbers of dives.

- Advance Adventurer: a program of five adventure dives and an introduction to the theory of 12 specialties. Considered equivalent to PADI's Advanced Open Water certificate.
- Specialty Diver: automatically awarded upon completion of 12 logged dives and two specialty programs.
- Advanced Open Water Diver: automatically awarded upon completion of 24 logged dives and four specialty programs.
- Diver Stress & Rescue: special training to recognize and handle with stress, prevent accidents and act correctly in an emergency. Considered equivalent to PADI's Rescue Diver program.
- Master Diver: the highest recreational rating, automatically awarded after completing four specialties, Diver Stress and Rescue, and 50 logged dives.

=== Scuba specialty programs ===
Below are some of the speciality courses that can be completed as part of the above certifications.

- Altitude diver - planning, procedures and equipment for diving at altitudes above 300 metres (1,000 ft) with reference to the modified decompression procedures required.
- Boat diving - boat diving techniques, choosing a travel agency and diving operator and what equipment to take when travelling.
- Deep diving - planning and conducting recreational dives below 18 metres (59 ft)
- Underwater photography - introduction to underwater photography, using a digital camera system, composition and editing of underwater photos
- Diver stress and rescue - how to avoid, recognize and deal with problems on the surface and underwater.
- Dry suit diving - advantages of dry suit diving, types of suits, valves, underwear and accessories, dry suit diving techniques and suit maintenance
- EAN Nitrox - planning dives with Nitrox and using Nitrox safely, including analyzing the mix before use.
- Decompression Diving - planning dives with a stage tank for faster decompression. Allows accumulated Deco time up to 15 minutes.
- Equipment techniques - choice of diving equipment to suit needs, and how to fit, adjust, maintain and make minor repairs to equipment.
- Navigation - using a compass and using environmental clues, how to estimate distances, navigate search patterns, find waypoints, and return to the exit point.
- Night and limited visibility - comparison of night and limited visibility diving, preparing for the dive, and the appropriate equipment and procedures.
- Perfect buoyancy - understanding the principles of buoyancy control and applying them in the water to reduce diver impact on the environment.
- Recreational sidemount diving - background, history, benefits and equipment of sidemount diving and how to configure the equipment and manage it in the water.
- River diving - peculiarities of diving in rivers, identifying and assessing hazards an how to manage river diving equipment.
- Science of diving - physics, physiology, decompression theory, marine life and diving equipment.
- Search and recovery - various search patterns using ropes and compasses, planning of search and recovery operations in a team, and the correct handling of lifting bags.
- Shark ecology - biology, ecology and identification of sharks, and procedures for diving with sharks.
- Waves, tides and currents - basics concepts of waves, tides and currents, and suitable equipment and procedures for diving in them from the shore and from boats.
- Wreck diving - how to get information on wrecks, to locate them, to prepare for a wreck dive, use appropriate wreck diving techniques, and identify and avoid hazards while diving on wrecks.

=== Professional diving certifications ===
The SSI Training Standards outline the professional qualifications and progression.

- Dive Guide (Dive leader, ISO 24801-3): prerequisites are certification for the specialities of Navigation, Deep Diving, and Night & Limited Visibility, plus Diver Stress & Rescue and 40 logged dives totaling at least 25 hours. To qualify, requires training, exams, and logging at least 50 open water dives totaling 32 hours.
- Divemaster: awarded to certified Dive Guides completing the Science of Diving speciality and logging 60 open water dives totaling at least 40 hours.
- Snorkel Instructor (ISO 13970)
- Assistant Instructor (Level 1 instructor, ISO 24802-1): prerequisite Divemaster.
- Open Water Instructor (Level 2 instructor, ISO 24802-2): prerequisite Divemaster. The qualified instructor can teach courses up to the level of Dive Guide.
- Divemaster Instructor (OWI + Deep Diving Instructor + Dive Guide Instructor + Diver Stress & Rescue Instructor + Navigation Instructor + Night & Limited Visibility Instructor + issued 25 certifications in different programs)
- Assistant Instructor Trainer (AIT)
- Master Instructor (MI = AIT + 250 dives + issued 150 certifications in different levels)
- Instructor Trainer
- Instructor Certifier

=== Extended Range ===
==== Extended Range certifications ====
- XR Nitrox Diver
- XR Advanced Wreck Diver
- XR Cavern Diver
- XR Sidemount Diving
- XR Gas Blender

==== Technical Extended Range certifications ====
- XR Extended Range Foundations
- XR Extended Range / XR Extended Range Limited Trimix
- XR Technical Extended Range Diver / XT Technical Extended Range Trimix Diver
- XR Hypoxic Trimix Diver
- XR Technical Wreck Diver
- XR Cave Diver
- XR Full Cave Diver

==== Professional certifications ====
- XR Nitrox Instructor
- XR Extended Range Instructor
- XR Cavern Diving Instructor
- XR Advanced Wreck Diving Instructor
- XR Technical Extended Range Instructor
- XR Hypoxic Trimix Diving Instructor
- XR Technical Wreck Diving Instructor
- XR Cave Diving Instructor
- XR Full Cave Diving Instructor
- XR Gas Blender Instructor
- XR Nitrox Instructor Trainer
- XR Extended Range Instructor Trainer
- XR Technical Extended Range Instructor Trainer
- XR Hypoxic Trimix Instructor Trainer
- XR International Training Director

== Classified Diving ==
The SSI Classified Diving program provides adaptive training for students with limited mobility and/or sensory disorders, allowing them to dive with one or more Classified Dive Buddies, or a Classified Dive Professional. Through this program, individuals with disabilities or limited mobility who are medically cleared by a physician can experience the thrill of scuba diving. First in a pool/confined water environment, then potentially in the open water.

- Level 1 – Must dive with a certified Classified Dive Buddy.
- Level 2 – Must dive with two (2) certified Classified Dive Buddies.
- Level 3 – Must dive with two (2) certified Classified Dive Buddies and one (1) Classified Dive Professional

== Public Safety Diving ==
Public Safety Divers are trained to provide critical services to the public, including search and rescue/recovery procedures, often in adverse conditions to include zero visibility. A Public Safety Diver is often involved in search, rescue, and recovery missions of water accident victims, assists law enforcement with investigations, and is often employed by local or national emergency services.

== Freediving and Mermaid ==
=== Freediving programs ===
- Try Freediving
- Freediving Explorer
- Basic Freediving
- Pool Freediver
- Freediver
- Advanced Pool Freediver
- Advanced Freediver
- Performance Freediver
- Freediving Specialty Programs such as:
  - No-Fins Freediving
  - Monofin
  - Free Immersion
  - Variable Weight
  - Training Tables

=== Freediving Professional Programs ===
- Snorkel Instructor
- Freediving Specialty Instructor
- Basic Freediving Instructor
- Freediving Assistant Instructor
- Freediving Instructor
- Advanced Freediving Instructor
- Performance Freediving Instructor
- Freediving Assistant Instructor Trainer
- Freediving Instructor Trainer

=== Mermaid Programs ===
- Try Mermaid
- Mermaid Explorer
- Mermaid
- Underwater Model
- Ocean Mermaid
- Underwater Dance

=== Mermaid Professional Programs ===
- Mermaid Instructor
- Model Mermaid Instructor
- Underwater Dance Instructor
- Mermaid Instructor Trainer

== Swim and Lifeguard ==
=== Swim Programs ===
- Baby Swim I, II, III
- Aquatike I, II, III
- Preschool I, II, III
- Beginner I, II, III
- Intermediate I, II
- Advanced I, II
- Swim Team Prep
- Adult 1
- Adult 2

=== Swim Professional Programs ===
- Assistant Swim Teacher
- Baby Swim Teacher
- Level 1 Swim Teacher
- Level 2 Swim Teacher
- Adult Swim Teacher
- Swim Teacher Instructor
- Swim Teacher Instructor Trainer

=== Lifeguard Programs ===
- Water Safety Attendant
- Pool Lifeguard
- Inland Open Water Lifeguard
- Beach Lifeguard

=== Lifeguard Professional Programs ===
- Level 1 Lifeguard Instructor
- Level 2 Lifeguard Instructor
- Lifeguard Instructor Trainer

== See also ==
- List of diver certification organizations – Agencies which issue certification for competence in diving skills
