= Scuba Educators International =

Recreational diver training and certification agency

- Abbreviation: SEI
- Predecessor: YMCA SCUBA, PDIC SCUBA
- Formation: 2008
- Type: NGO
- Purpose: Underwater diver training
- Headquarters: Casper, WY, USA
- Location: P.O.Box 3821 Casper, WY 82602
- Region served: World
- CEO: Jim Gunderson
- Main organ: Board of Directors
- Website: https://www.scubaeducators.org/

Scuba Educators International (SEI) is an underwater diving training organization established in the United States during 2008 to continue the underwater diving training program known as the YMCA SCUBA Program which ceased operation in 2008 and the PDIC Diving program becoming Scuba Educators International (SEI) in 2008.

== Origins ==
Scuba Educators International was founded in 2008 by a group of former senior YMCA SCUBA instructors following the announcement of the closure of the YMCA Scuba Program by the YMCA of the USA with the intention of continuing the YMCA Scuba Program under a new banner. The new agency was conceived as being an organization that would operate world-wide and in complete independence of the YMCA of the US, “but will continue to share philosophies and dedication to the highest quality education in the (diving) industry”.

== Recognition ==
During 2010, Scuba Educators International entered in an agreement with the Underwater Society of America (USOA) to issue CMAS International Diver Training Certificates. Scuba Educators International is a member of the Diving Equipment and Marketing Association (DEMA) with its CEO, Jim Gunderson, serving on the DEMA Board of Directors.

== Qualifications ==
The SEI Qualification System was structured as of July 2014.

=== Snorkel ===
- Snorkeling for Families

=== Scuba ===
- Try Scuba
- Open Water Diver
- Junior Open Water Diver
- Diver Refreshed
- Advanced Open Water Diver Level 2
- Advanced Open Water Diver Level 3
- Master Scuba Diver Level 4

=== Leadership ===
- Divemaster
- Assistant Instructor
- Instructor
- Instructor Trainer

=== Specialities ===
- DRAM (Dive Rescue & Accident Management) Rescue Diver
- Nitrox Diver
- Equipment Service
- Ice Diver
- Full Face Mask Diver
- Reef Ecology
- Search and Recovery
- Dry Suit Diver
- Underwater Photography
- Underwater Archaeology
- Hunting and Collecting
- Night/Limited Visibility
- Diving Comfort
- Diving Science
- Navigation

=== CMAS Equivalencies ===
The following equivalencies were agreed by the USOA and SEI during 2010.

CMAS	SEI
CMAS 1 Star Diver	SEI Open Water Diver (minimum age 15)
CMAS 2 Star Diver	SEI Advanced Open Water Diver (minimum age 15 with 20 logged dives)
CMAS 3 Star Diver	SEI Advanced Plus Diver with (minimum age 16 with 50 logged dives)
CMAS 4 Star Diver	SEI Master Diver with DRAM Rescue Diver and 100 logged dives
CMAS 1 Star Instructor	SEI Divemaster (minimum age 18 with 40 logged dives)
CMAS 2 Star Instructor	SEI Instructor (minimum age 19 with 100 logged dives)
CMAS 3 Star Instructor	SEI Instructor Trainer (minimum age 21 with 200 logged dives)
