= Advanced Open Water Diver =

Recreational scuba diving certification slightly above minimum entry level

Advanced Open Water Diver (AOWD) is a recreational scuba diving certification level provided by several diver training agencies. Agencies offering this level of training under this title include Professional Association of Diving Instructors (PADI), and Scuba Schools International (SSI). Other agencies offer similar training under different titles. Advanced Open Water Diver is one step up from entry level certification as a beginner autonomous scuba diver. A major difference between Autonomous diver equivalent Open Water Diver (OWD) certification and AOWD is that the depth limit is increased from 18 to 30 metres (60 to 100 ft).

Prerequisite certification level for AOWD training is OWD or a recognized equivalent (ISO 24801-2). Certification requirements for AOWD includes theory learning and assessment, practical training and assessment, and a minimum requirement for number of logged dives, that varies between agencies. SSI requires 24 logged dives. PADI requires 5 dives on course, and the prerequisite is OWD which requires 4 open water dives. No additional logged dives are specified.

Scuba diving education levels as used by ISO, PADI, CMAS, SSI and NAUI

== Equivalent certification ==
The equivalent course offered by National Association of Underwater Instructors (NAUI) is the Advanced Scuba Diver. As a second level qualification, the AOWD certification level is aimed somewhere between the CMAS* Diver and CMAS** Diver qualifications, or between the British Sub-Aqua Club (BSAC) Ocean Diver and Sports Diver qualifications, although some differences occur. For example, BSAC Ocean Divers are trained in basic rescue skills for recreational diving, but only need five open water dives to qualify. Scuba Diving International (SDI) and SSI both offer an Advanced Adventure Diver course similar to the PADI Advanced Open Water Diver courses.

The World Underwater Federation, CMAS, recognizes four main levels of dive education indicated by a one star, two star, three star, or four star designation. One star indicates an ability to dive in the company of an experienced diver, two star indicates additional skills and the ability to dive with a diver of the same grade, three star indicates the additional skill in leading a group of divers of any grade in open water. Four star diver is an award issued by a national technical committee to a diver competent to use divers and diving in order to achieve major tasks or project objectives.

== Purpose ==
The whole PADI training system.

The AOWD is the second level qualification offered by several diving agencies following the American ANSI standard. At the first level, Open Water Diver, divers gain basic knowledge of skills, equipment and theory for diving to a recommended depth of about 18 metres (60 ft). The AOWD is described by PADI as refining these skills, allowing the diver to explore a broader variety of diving to a maximum depth of 30 metres (100 ft). Prior to starting an AOWD course, some organizations have prerequisites for a particular number of logged dives. The course usually contains some mandatory dives and knowledge while another portion of the course consists of free elective topics such as drift diving or search and recovery.

== Certification standards ==
The PADI Advanced Open Water Diver course requires a single instance of an Underwater navigation and a Deep diving activity as well as a single instance of three of the remaining topics from a list of approximately 18 possible specialties (referred to as "Adventure Dives"). The specialties that can be chosen from vary according to the facilities of the instructors. The common specialties are: Altitude Diving, Boat Diving, Digital Underwater Imaging, Drift Diving, Dry Suit Diving, Fish Identification, Night Diving, Peak Performance Buoyancy, Search & Recovery, Underwater Naturalist, and Wreck Diving. If the PADI Instructor meets additional prerequisites and other requirements, others may be offered, including: Cavern Diving, Delayed Surface Marker Buoy (DSMB) Diving, Dive Against Debris, Diver Propulsion Vehicle (DPV) Diving, Enriched Air Nitrox Diving, Full Face Mask Diving, Ice Diving, Rebreather Diving, Self-Reliant Diving, Shark Conservation, Sidemount Diving.

Until 1998, night diving was also mandatory, but this is no longer the case. It was dropped at the request of the Scandinavian countries, for whom there is almost no night during the summer months when most of the diving is done, as it created an unreasonable restriction on certifying advanced divers (which is a prerequisite for further training). Most other countries still recommend the night diver course.

According to PADI, the Advanced Open Water Diver course is for divers who want to gain more underwater experience while diving with a PADI Professional, or have fun learning new things. In addition to logging more dives, the student can improve skills learned during their open water diver course, such as navigation and buoyancy.

The SSI Advanced Open Water program requires training and diving experience. To be certified as a SSI AOWD one needs to have completed four specialty courses and minimum of 24 logged dives. In the absence of a logged dives requirement, it is possible to become certified as AOW with some other agencies while having less than 10 lifetime dives.

== Issues ==
The name of this specific training level has been a topic of controversy within the diving community for many years. The crux of this debate is in the interpretation of the word 'Advanced' in its title, and what is the proper application or use of this adjective.

Those organisations offering training and certification under the title Advanced Open Water Diver defend the use of the word Advanced, claiming that it describes the training accurately as being more comprehensive (i.e., more advanced) than the basic entry-level training.

The opposing school of thought is that the use of the word 'Advanced' is essentially deceptive marketing, as graduates of the class very commonly then refer to themselves as "Advanced Divers". However, the training standards are not sufficient to raise a recreational diver (particularly the novice diver to whom the class is frequently marketed) to traditional expectations of general recreational diving skill mastery. This is relevant because in the USA the diving community continues to equate 'advanced' with 'expert.' As such, while it is agreed that the training is indeed more than the minimum basic requirement, it is insufficient to develop an objectively advanced (i.e., expert) diver.

Specifically with regard to the PADI 'Advanced' certification standard, a 2006 coroner's court in the United Kingdom heard expert evidence to the effect that "I do not believe that someone with eight dives should be classified as an advanced diver. It is madness."

A related matter is NAUI's name changes from "Open Water II" to "Advanced Scuba Diver." NAUI's program was, at the time, a 38 hr. Open Water I course, followed by a six dive Open Water II course (aka "Sport Diver"), followed by the third course in the sequence, "Advanced Diver." At the time, PADI had a similar progression. Then, PADI eliminated its upper level course (Advanced Open Water Diver) and repurposed the title for its middle course to gain a competitive advantage. NAUI followed suit, in an unsuccessful attempt to maintain market share. Publicly, NAUI claimed that this change was intended to address customer confusion as to the comparative rigors of training required to earn specific certifications.
