= Rescue Diver =

Recreational scuba certification emphasising emergency response and diver rescue

Rescue Diver is a scuba diving certification level provided by several diver training agencies, such as PADI, SSI, SDI, and NAUI, which emphasises emergency response and diver rescue.

Scuba diving education levels as used by ISO, PADI, CMAS, SSI and NAUI.

The certification level is loosely equivalent the CMAS ** Diver qualification and the BSAC sports diver, although the European courses tend to be longer and more intensive than their U.S. counterparts.

Most organizations have a minimum age requirement of 15 to undertake the Rescue Diver course, although PADI does permit certification of "Junior" Rescue Divers.

== Background ==
The whole PADI training system.

The Rescue Diver course is the third level qualification in the American international system, following the Advanced Open Water Diver qualification (AOWD). Historically the course was treated as a separate "speciality" rather than a mainstream certification in itself (and arguably it still is in many organization's certification structure), but most advanced training is contingent upon having previously completed the Rescue Diver certification, and thus it effectively becomes a tier in the training.

The European International dive education system CMAS recognises only three main levels of dive education indicated by a one star, two star, or three star system. One star indicates an ability to dive, two star indicates additional skill of rescuing divers, and three star indicates the additional skill in leading a group of divers.

== Training ==
The course usually covers most of the following topics:

- Self-rescue and diver stress
- Emergency management and equipment
- Panicked diver response
- In-water rescue breathing protocols
- Egress (exits)
- Dive accident scenarios

In many training agencies, these dives represent introductory knowledge and skills that may be further refined in a speciality course.
