= History of scuba diving =

Origins and development of diving using breathing gas carried by the diver

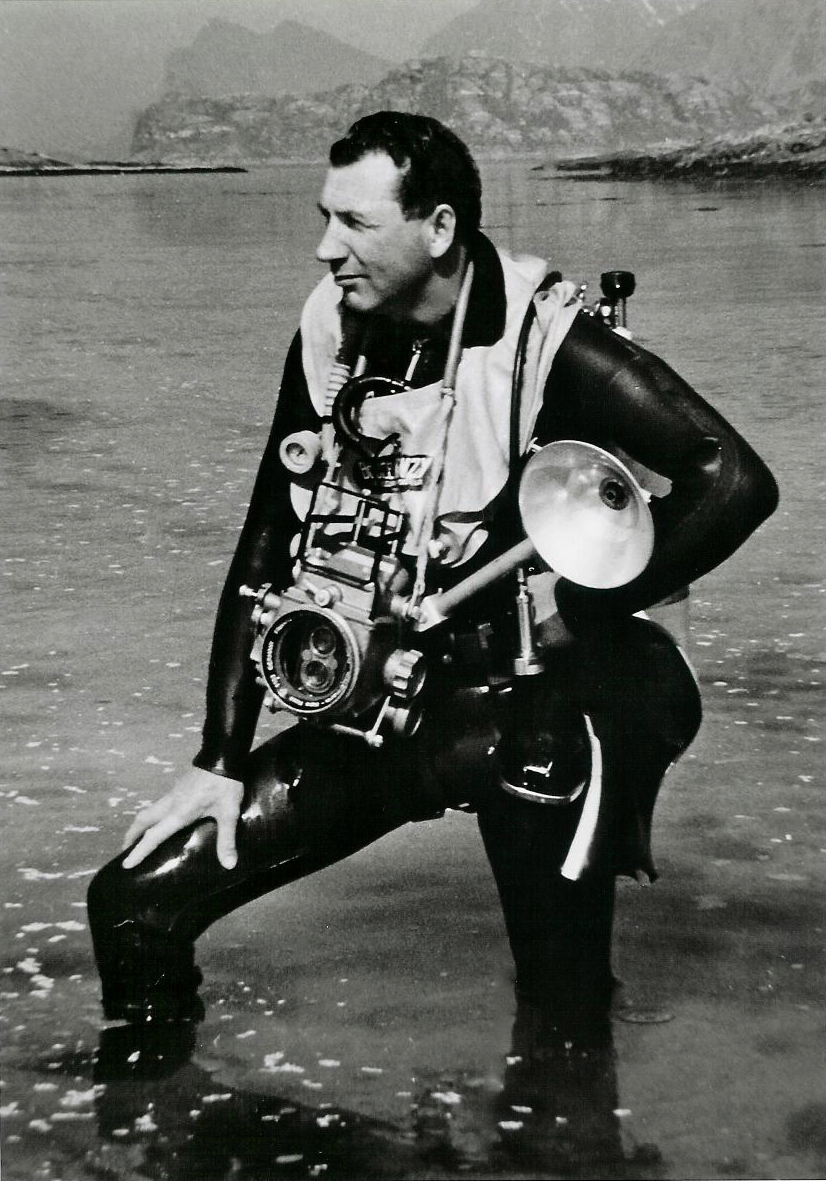
Scuba diver of the late 1960s

The history of scuba diving is closely linked with the history of diving equipment. By the turn of the twentieth century, two basic architectures for underwater breathing apparatus had been pioneered; open-circuit surface supplied equipment where the diver's exhaled gas is vented directly into the water, and closed-circuit breathing apparatus where the diver's carbon dioxide is filtered from the exhaled breathing gas, which is then recirculated, and more gas added to replenish the oxygen content. Closed circuit equipment was more easily adapted to scuba in the absence of reliable, portable, and economical high pressure gas storage vessels. By the mid-twentieth century, high pressure cylinders were available and two systems for scuba had emerged: open-circuit scuba where the diver's exhaled breath is vented directly into the water, and closed-circuit scuba where the carbon dioxide is removed from the diver's exhaled breath which has oxygen added and is recirculated. Oxygen rebreathers are severely depth limited due to oxygen toxicity risk, which increases with depth, and the available systems for mixed gas rebreathers were fairly bulky and designed for use with diving helmets. The first commercially practical scuba rebreather was designed and built by the diving engineer Henry Fleuss in 1878, while working for Siebe Gorman in London. His self contained breathing apparatus consisted of a rubber mask connected to a breathing bag, with an estimated 50–60% oxygen supplied from a copper tank and carbon dioxide scrubbed by passing it through a bundle of rope yarn soaked in a solution of caustic potash. During the 1930s and all through World War II, the British, Italians and Germans developed and extensively used oxygen rebreathers to equip the first frogmen. In the U.S. Major Christian J. Lambertsen invented a free-swimming oxygen rebreather. In 1952 he patented a modification of his apparatus, this time named SCUBA, an acronym for "self-contained underwater breathing apparatus," which became the generic English word for autonomous breathing equipment for diving, and later for the activity using the equipment. After World War II, military frogmen continued to use rebreathers since they do not make bubbles which would give away the presence of the divers. The high percentage of oxygen used by these early rebreather systems limited the depth at which they could be used due to the risk of convulsions caused by acute oxygen toxicity.

Although a working demand regulator system had been invented in 1864 by Auguste Denayrouze and Benoît Rouquayrol, the first open-circuit scuba system developed in 1925 by Yves Le Prieur in France was a manually adjusted free-flow system with a low endurance, which limited the practical usefulness of the system. In 1942, during the German occupation of France, Jacques-Yves Cousteau and Émile Gagnan designed the first successful and safe open-circuit scuba, a twin hose system known as the Aqua-Lung. Their system combined an improved demand regulator with high-pressure air tanks. This was patented in 1945. To sell his regulator in English-speaking countries Cousteau registered the Aqua-Lung trademark, which was first licensed to the U.S. Divers company, and in 1948 to Siebe Gorman of England.

Early scuba sets were usually provided with a plain harness of shoulder straps and waist belt. Many harnesses did not have a backplate, and the cylinders rested directly against the diver's back. Early scuba divers dived without a buoyancy aid. In an emergency they had to jettison their weights. In the 1960s adjustable buoyancy life jackets (ABLJ) became available, which can be used to compensate for loss of buoyancy at depth due to compression of the neoprene wetsuit and as a lifejacket that will hold an unconscious diver face-upwards at the surface. The first versions were inflated from a small disposable carbon dioxide cylinder, later with a small direct coupled air cylinder. A low-pressure feed from the regulator first-stage to an inflation/deflation valve unit an oral inflation valve and a dump valve lets the volume of the ABLJ be controlled as a buoyancy aid. In 1971 the stabilizer jacket was introduced by ScubaPro. This class of buoyancy aid is known as a buoyancy control device or buoyancy compensator. A backplate and wing is an alternative configuration of scuba harness with a buoyancy compensation bladder known as a "wing" mounted behind the diver, sandwiched between the backplate and the cylinder or cylinders. This arrangement became popular with cave divers making long or deep dives, who needed to carry several extra cylinders, as it clears the front and sides of the diver for other equipment to be attached in the region where it is easily accessible. Sidemount is a scuba diving equipment configuration which has basic scuba sets, each comprising a single cylinder with a dedicated regulator and pressure gauge, mounted alongside the diver, clipped to the harness below the shoulders and along the hips, instead of on the back of the diver. It originated as a configuration for advanced cave diving, as it facilitates penetration of tight sections of cave, as sets can be easily removed and remounted when necessary. Sidemount diving has grown in popularity within the technical diving community for general decompression diving, and has become a popular specialty for recreational diving.

In the 1950s the United States Navy (USN) documented procedures for military use of what is now called nitrox, and in 1970, Morgan Wells, of NOAA, began instituting diving procedures for oxygen-enriched air. In 1979 NOAA published procedures for the scientific use of nitrox in the NOAA Diving Manual. In 1985 IAND (International Association of Nitrox Divers) began teaching nitrox use for recreational diving. After initial resistance by some agencies, the use of a single nitrox mixture has become part of recreational diving, and multiple gas mixtures are common in technical diving to reduce overall decompression time. Oxygen toxicity limits the depth when breathing nitrox mixtures. In 1924 the U.S. Navy started to investigate the possibility of using helium and after animal experiments, human subjects breathing heliox 20/80 (20% oxygen, 80% helium) were successfully decompressed from deep dives, Cave divers started using trimix to allow deeper dives and it was used extensively in the 1987 Wakulla Springs Project and spread to the north-east American wreck diving community. The challenges of deeper dives and longer penetrations and the large amounts of breathing gas necessary for these dive profiles and ready availability of oxygen sensing cells beginning in the late 1980s led to a resurgence of interest in rebreather diving. By accurately measuring the partial pressure of oxygen, it became possible to maintain and accurately monitor a breathable gas mixture in the loop at any depth. In the mid-1990s semi-closed circuit rebreathers became available for the recreational scuba market, followed by closed circuit rebreathers around the turn of the millennium. Rebreathers are currently (2018) manufactured for the military, technical and recreational scuba markets.

== Early history ==
A scuba set is characterized by full independence from the surface during use, by providing breathing gas carried by the diver. Early attempts to reach this autonomy were made in the 18th century by the Englishman John Lethbridge, who invented and successfully built his own underwater diving machine in 1715, but though the air supply was carried in the diving apparatus, it relied on surface tenders to deploy and move around under the water, and was effectively an atmospheric pressure diving bell.

An early diving dress using a compressed air reservoir was designed and built in 1771 by Sieur Fréminet from Paris. He conceived an autonomous breathing machine equipped with a reservoir, dragged behind the diver or mounted on his back. Fréminet called his invention machine hydrostatergatique and used it successfully for more than ten years in the harbors of Le Havre and Brest, as stated in the explanatory text of a 1784 painting.

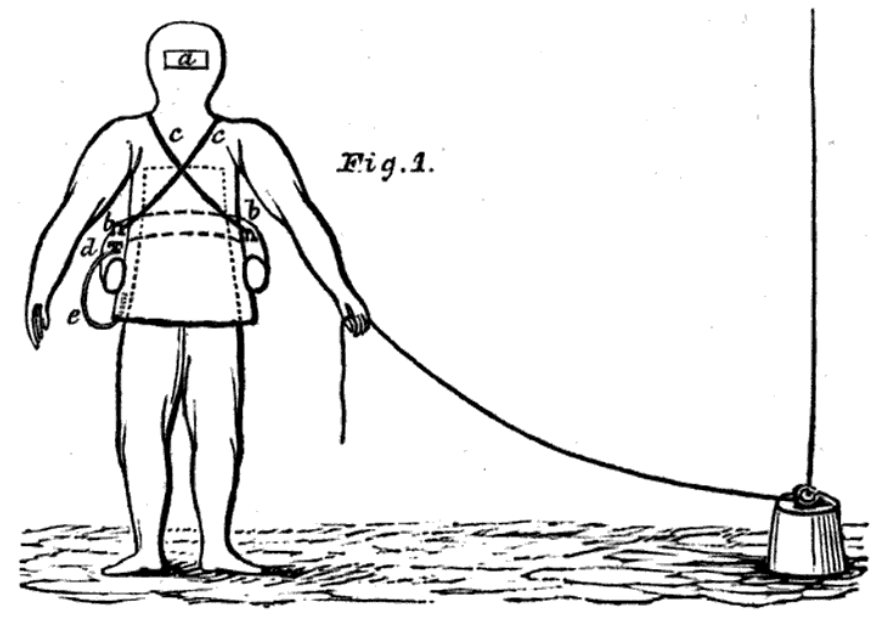
Diagram of the diving suit invented by Charles Condert of Brooklyn, N.Y.: a. Glass viewport; b. Copper pipe bent into arc with closed ends to hold air; c. Slings to support air tank; d. Valve to let air out as needed; e. Pipe to supply air into the suit

The Frenchman Paul Lemaire d'Augerville built and used autonomous diving equipment in 1824, as did the British William H. James in 1825. James' helmet was made of "thin copper or sole of leather" with a plate window, and the air was supplied from an iron reservoir. A similar system was used in 1831 by the American Charles Condert, who died in 1832 while testing his invention in the East River at only 20 feet (6 m) deep. The oldest known oxygen rebreather was patented on June 17, 1808, by Sieur Touboulic from Brest, mechanic in Napoleon's Imperial Navy, but there is no evidence of any prototype having been manufactured. This early rebreather design worked with an oxygen reservoir, the oxygen being delivered progressively by the diver himself and circulating in a closed circuit through a sponge soaked in limewater.

After having travelled to England and discovered William James' invention, the French physician Manuel Théodore Guillaumet, from Argentan (Normandy), patented in 1838 the oldest known regulator mechanism. Guillaumet's invention was air-supplied from the surface and was never mass-produced due to problems with safety. The oldest practical rebreather relates to the 1849 patent from the Frenchman Pierre Aimable De Saint Simon Sicard.

== First successful scuba equipment ==
These early inventions were mostly based on a constant-flow supply of the air, and could produce the high pressures needed to supply compressed air to the diver. The compression and storage technology was not advanced enough to allow compressed air to be stored in containers at sufficiently high pressures to allow useful dive times.

By the turn of the twentieth century, two basic templates for a scuba had emerged; open-circuit scuba where the diver's exhaled gas is vented directly into the water, and closed-circuit scuba where the diver's carbon dioxide is filtered from unused oxygen, which is then recirculated.

=== Open circuit ===
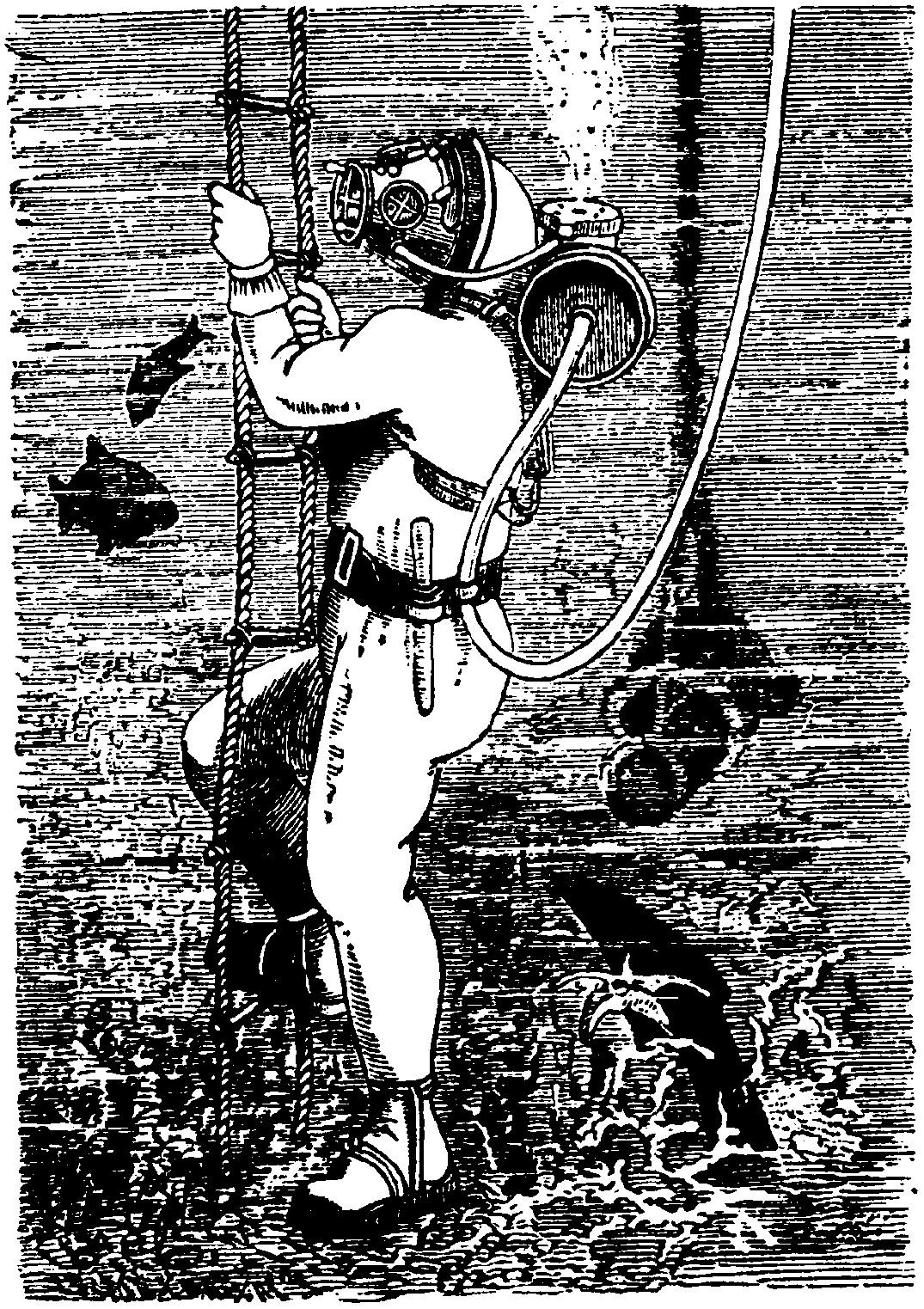
The Rouquayrol-Denayrouze apparatus was the first regulator to be mass-produced (from 1865 to 1965). In this picture the air reservoir presents its surface-supplied configuration.

The first systems that became widely popular with recreational divers were open circuit demand scuba. They were safer than early rebreather systems, less expensive to operate, and allowed dives to greater depths.

An important step for the development of open circuit scuba technology was the invention of the demand regulator, a mechanism that conserves breathing gas supply by providing flow only when the outlet pressure is reduced when the diver inhales. In 1864, the French engineers Auguste Denayrouze and Benoît Rouquayrol designed and patented their "Rouquayrol-Denayrouze diving suit" after adapting a pressure regulator and developing it for underwater use. This would be the first diving suit that could automatically supply air to the diver on demand by adjusting the flow of air from the tank to meet the diver's breathing and pressure requirements. The system still had to use surface supply to provide useful endurance, as the pressure cylinder provided was only a low capacity accumulator.

The first open-circuit scuba system was devised in 1925 by Yves Le Prieur in France. Inspired by the simple ambient pressure supply valve apparatus of Maurice Fernez and the freedom it allowed the diver, he made it independent of surface supply by using three litre Michelin cylinders containing air compressed to 150 kilograms per square centimetre (2,100 psi; 150 bar). The "Fernez-Le Prieur" diving apparatus was demonstrated at the swimming pool of Tourelles in Paris in 1926. The unit consisted of a cylinder of compressed air carried on the back of the diver, connected to a pressure regulator designed by Le Prieur which was adjusted manually by the diver, with two gauges, one for tank pressure and one for output (supply) pressure. Air was supplied continuously through the mouthpiece and exhausted through a short tube fitted with a non-return exhaust valve as in the Fernez design. The continuous flow of air and the consequent low endurance of the apparatus limited the practical use of LePrieur's device.

Fernez had previously invented a noseclip, a mouthpiece fitted with a one-way valve for exhalation and diving goggles, and Le Prieur just added a manually controlled regulator and a compressed air cylinder to those elements. Fernez's goggles did not cover the nose, which allows the diver to equalise the internal pressure by letting air flow into the goggles through the nose, so they did not allow a dive deeper than ten metres due to "mask squeeze". In 1933, Le Prieur replaced the goggles, noseclip and valve by a full face mask, directly supplied with constant flow air from the cylinder. Le Prieur's design was the first autonomous breathing device used by the first scuba diving clubs in history – Racleurs de fond founded by Glenn Orr in California in 1933, and Club des sous-l'eau founded by Le Prieur himself in Paris in 1935.

In 1942, during the German occupation of France, Jacques-Yves Cousteau and Émile Gagnan designed the first reliable and commercially successful open-circuit scuba, known as the Aqua-Lung. Their system combined an improved demand regulator with high-pressure air tanks. Émile Gagnan, an engineer employed by the Air Liquide company, miniaturized and adapted the regulator manufactured for use with gas generators in response to the constant fuel shortage that was a consequence of German requisitioning. Gagnan's boss, Henri Melchior, knew that his son-in-law Jacques-Yves Cousteau was looking for an automatic demand regulator to increase the useful endurance of the underwater breathing apparatus invented by Le Prieur, so he introduced Cousteau to Gagnan in December 1942. On Cousteau's initiative, Gagnan's regulator was adapted to diving, and the new Cousteau-Gagnan patent was registered some weeks later in 1943.

=== Closed circuit ===
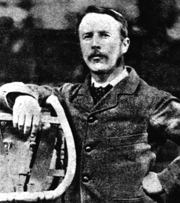
Henry Fleuss (1851–1932) improved the rebreather technology.

The alternative concept, developed in roughly the same time frame was closed-circuit scuba. The body normally consumes and metabolises only a small fraction of inhaled oxygen – the situation is even more wasteful of oxygen when the breathing gas is compressed as it is in ambient pressure breathing systems underwater. The rebreather recycles the exhaled breathing gas, while constantly replenishing it from an oxygen-rich supply so that the oxygen level is not depleted. The apparatus also has to remove the exhaled carbon dioxide, as a buildup of CO_{2} levels would result in respiratory distress and hypercapnia.

The first commercially practical scuba rebreather was designed and built by the diving engineer Henry Fleuss in 1878, while working for Siebe Gorman in London. His self contained breathing apparatus consisted of a rubber mask connected to a breathing bag, with an estimated 50–60% oxygen supplied from a copper tank and carbon dioxide scrubbed by passing it through a bundle of rope yarn soaked in a solution of caustic potash, the system giving a dive duration of up to about three hours. Fleuss tested his device in 1879 by spending an hour submerged in a water tank, then one week later by diving to a depth of 5.5 metres (18 ft) in open water, on which occasion he was slightly injured when his assistants abruptly pulled him to the surface. This apparatus was first used under operational conditions in 1880 by Alexander Lambert, the lead diver on the Severn Tunnel construction project, who was able to travel 1,000 feet (300 m) in the darkness to close several submerged sluice doors in the tunnel; this had defeated the best efforts of standard divers due to extremely long distance, along which their air supply hoses became fouled on submerged debris, and the strong water currents in the workings.

Fleuss continually improved his apparatus, adding a demand regulator and tanks capable of holding greater amounts of oxygen at higher pressure. Sir Robert Davis, head of Siebe Gorman, improved the oxygen rebreather in 1910 with his invention of the Davis Submerged Escape Apparatus, the first rebreather to be made in quantity. While intended primarily as an emergency escape apparatus for submarine crews, it was soon also used for diving, being a handy shallow water diving apparatus with a thirty-minute endurance, and as an industrial breathing set.

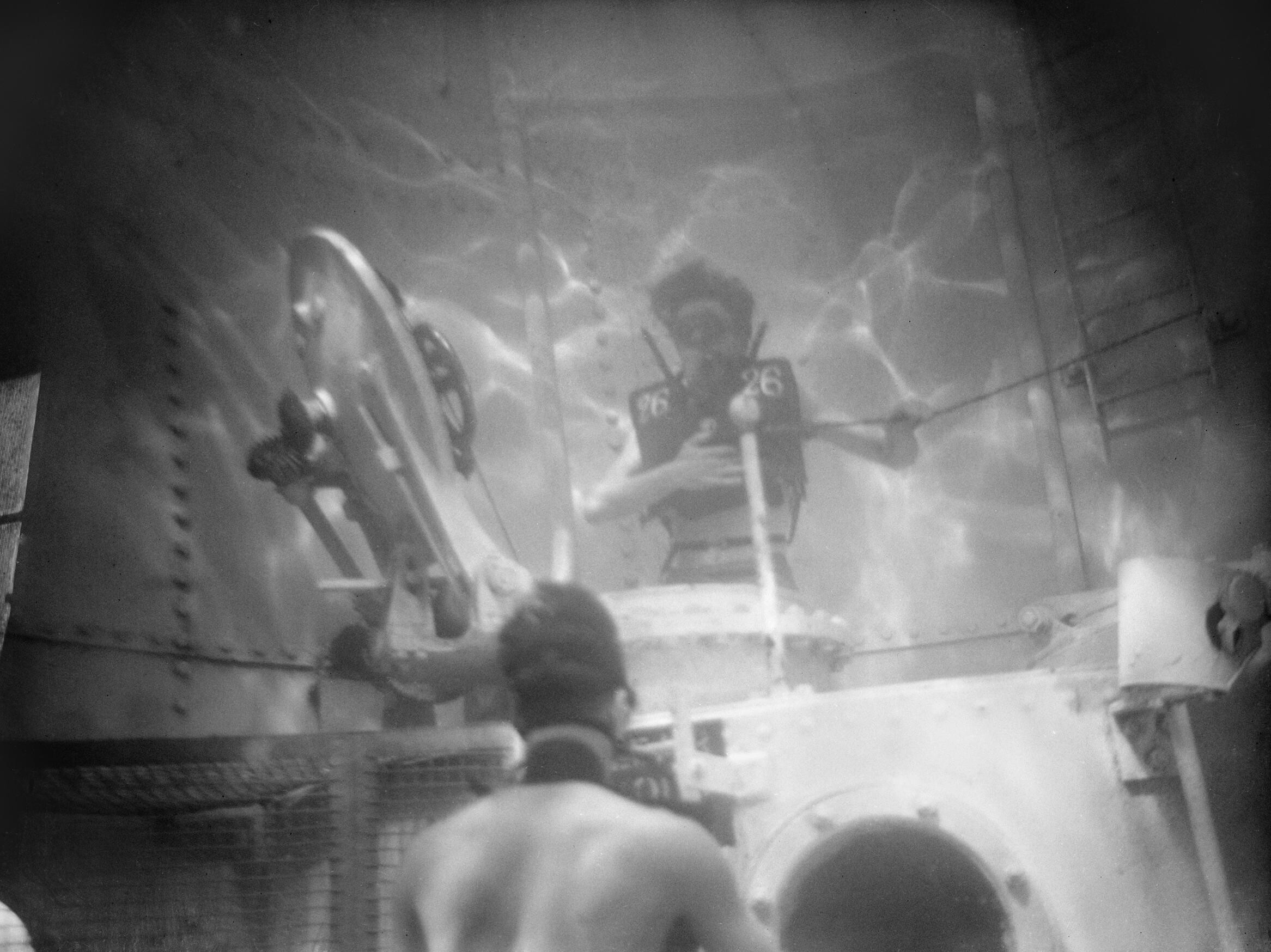
Davis Submerged Escape Apparatus being tested at the submarine escape test tank at HMS Dolphin, Gosport, 14 December 1942.

The rig comprised a rubber breathing/buoyancy bag containing a canister of barium hydroxide to absorb exhaled carbon dioxide and, in a pocket at the lower end of the bag, a steel pressure cylinder holding approximately 56 litres (2.0 cu ft) of oxygen at a pressure of 120 bars (1,700 psi) which was equipped with a control valve and connected to the breathing bag. Opening the cylinder's valve admitted oxygen to the bag at ambient pressure. The rig also included an emergency buoyancy bag on its front to help keep the wearer afloat. After further development by Davis in 1927 the DSEA was adopted by the Royal Navy.

In 1911 Dräger of Lübeck tested a self-contained rebreather system for standard diving equipment, which used an injector system to circulate the breathing gas through the breathing loop and scrubber. This was put into service soon thereafter and was available in two versions, an oxygen rebreather DM20 for depths shallower than 20 m, and a nitrox rebreather DM40 for depths up to 40 m.

During the 1930s and all through World War II, the British, Italians and Germans developed and extensively used oxygen rebreathers to equip the first frogmen. The British adapted the Davis Submerged Escape Apparatus and the Germans adapted the Dräger submarine escape rebreathers, for their frogmen during the war. The Italians developed similar rebreathers for the combat swimmers of the Decima Flottiglia MAS, especially the Pirelli ARO. In the U.S. Major Christian J. Lambertsen invented an underwater free-swimming oxygen rebreather in 1939, which was accepted by the Office of Strategic Services. In 1952 he patented a modification of his apparatus, this time named SCUBA,(an acronym for "self-contained underwater breathing apparatus"), which later became the generic English word for autonomous breathing equipment for diving, and later for the activity using the equipment. After World War II, military frogmen continued to use rebreathers since they do not make bubbles which would give away the presence of the divers. The high percentage of oxygen used by these early rebreather systems limited the depth at which they could be used due to the risk of convulsions caused by acute oxygen toxicity.

== Post WWII ==
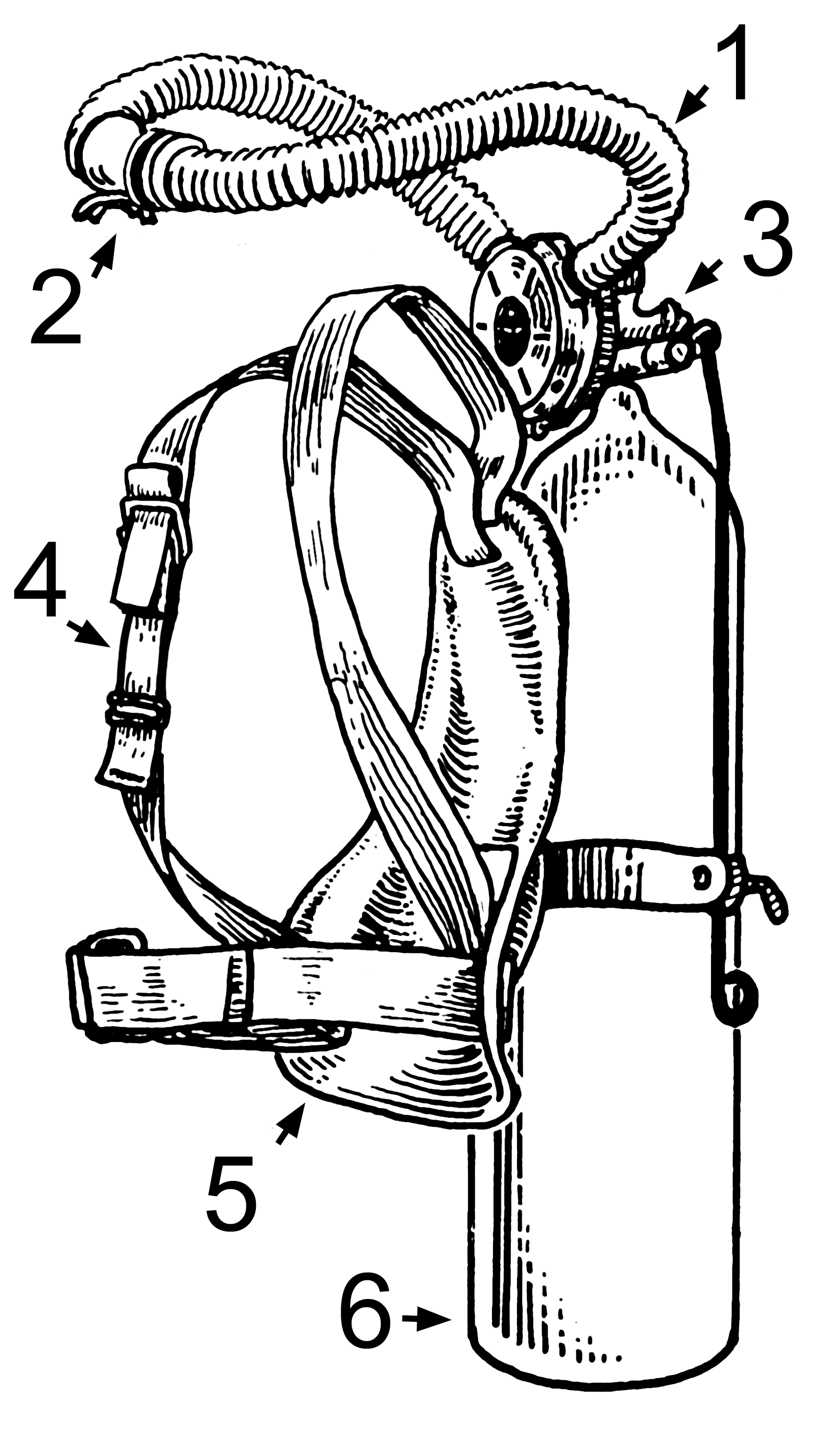
Mistral twin-hose regulator mounted on a diving cylinder. The regulator comprises the mouthpiece and the regulator body, connected by the supply and exhaust hoses. The regulator is connected to the outlet valve of the high-pressure cylinder.: 1. Hose; 2. Mouthpiece; 3. Valve; 4. Harness; 5. Backplate; 6. Cylinder

Air Liquide started selling the Cousteau-Gagnan regulator commercially in 1946 under the name of scaphandre Cousteau-Gagnan or CG45 ("C" for Cousteau, "G" for Gagnan and 45 for the 1945 patent). The same year Air Liquide created a division called La Spirotechnique, to develop and sell regulators and other diving equipment. To sell his regulator in English-speaking countries Cousteau registered the Aqua-Lung trademark, which was first licensed to the U.S. Divers company.(the American division of Air Liquide) and later sold with La Spirotechnique and U.S. Divers to finally become the name of the company, Aqua-Lung/La Spirotechnique, currently located in Carros, near Nice.

In 1948 the Cousteau-Gagnan patent was also licensed to Siebe Gorman of England, Siebe Gorman was allowed to sell in Commonwealth countries, but had difficulty in meeting the demand and the U.S. patent prevented others from making the product. This patent was circumvented by Ted Eldred of Melbourne, Australia, who had been developing a rebreather called the Porpoise. When a demonstration of this rebreather resulted in a diver passing out, he developed the single-hose open-circuit scuba system, which separates the first stage and demand valve of the pressure regulator by a low-pressure hose, puts the demand valve at the diver's mouth, and releases exhaled gas through the demand valve casing. Eldred sold the first Porpoise Model CA single hose scuba early in 1952.

Early scuba sets were usually provided with a plain harness of shoulder straps and waist belt. The waist belt buckles were usually quick-release, and shoulder straps sometimes had adjustable or quick release buckles. Many harnesses did not have a backplate, and the cylinders rested directly against the diver's back.

Early scuba divers dived without a buoyancy aid. In an emergency they had to jettison their weights. In the 1960s adjustable buoyancy life jackets (ABLJ) became available, which can be used to compensate for loss of buoyancy at depth due to compression of the neoprene wetsuit and as a lifejacket that will hold an unconscious diver face-upwards at the surface, and that can be quickly inflated. The first versions were inflated from a small disposable carbon dioxide cylinder, later with a small direct coupled air cylinder. A low-pressure feed from the regulator first-stage to an inflation/deflation valve unit lets the volume of the ABLJ be controlled as a buoyancy aid. In 1971 the stabilizer jacket was introduced by ScubaPro. This class of buoyancy aid is known as a buoyancy control device or buoyancy compensator.

A backplate and wing is an alternative configuration of scuba harness with a buoyancy compensation bladder known as a "wing" mounted behind the diver, sandwiched between the backplate and the cylinder or cylinders. Unlike stabilizer jackets, the backplate and wing is a modular system, in that it consists of separable components. This arrangement became popular with cave divers making long or deep dives, who needed to carry several extra cylinders, as it clears the front and sides of the diver for other equipment to be attached in the region where it is easily accessible. This additional equipment is usually suspended from the harness or carried in pockets on the exposure suit.

In 1911 Dräger of Germany tested an injector operated rebreather backpack for a standard diving suit. This concept was produced and marketed as the DM20 oxygen rebreather system and the DM40 nitrox rebreather system, in which air from one cylinder and oxygen from a second cylinder were mixed during injection through a nozzle which circulated the breathing gas through the scrubber and the rest of the loop. The DM40 was rated for depths up to 40m. In the 1950s the United States Navy (USN) documented enriched oxygen gas procedures for military use of what we today call nitrox, in the USN Diving Manual, and in 1970, Morgan Wells, who was the first director of the National Oceanographic and Atmospheric Administration (NOAA) Diving Center, began instituting diving procedures for oxygen-enriched air. In 1979 NOAA published Wells' procedures for the scientific use of nitrox in the NOAA Diving Manual. In 1985 Dick Rutkowski, a former NOAA diving safety officer, formed IAND (International Association of Nitrox Divers) and began teaching nitrox use for recreational diving. This was considered dangerous by some, and met with heavy skepticism by the diving community. Nevertheless, in 1992 NAUI became the first existing major recreational diver training agency to sanction nitrox, and eventually, in 1996, the Professional Association of Diving Instructors (PADI) announced full educational support for nitrox. The use of a single nitrox mixture has become part of recreational diving, and multiple gas mixtures are common in technical diving to reduce overall decompression time.

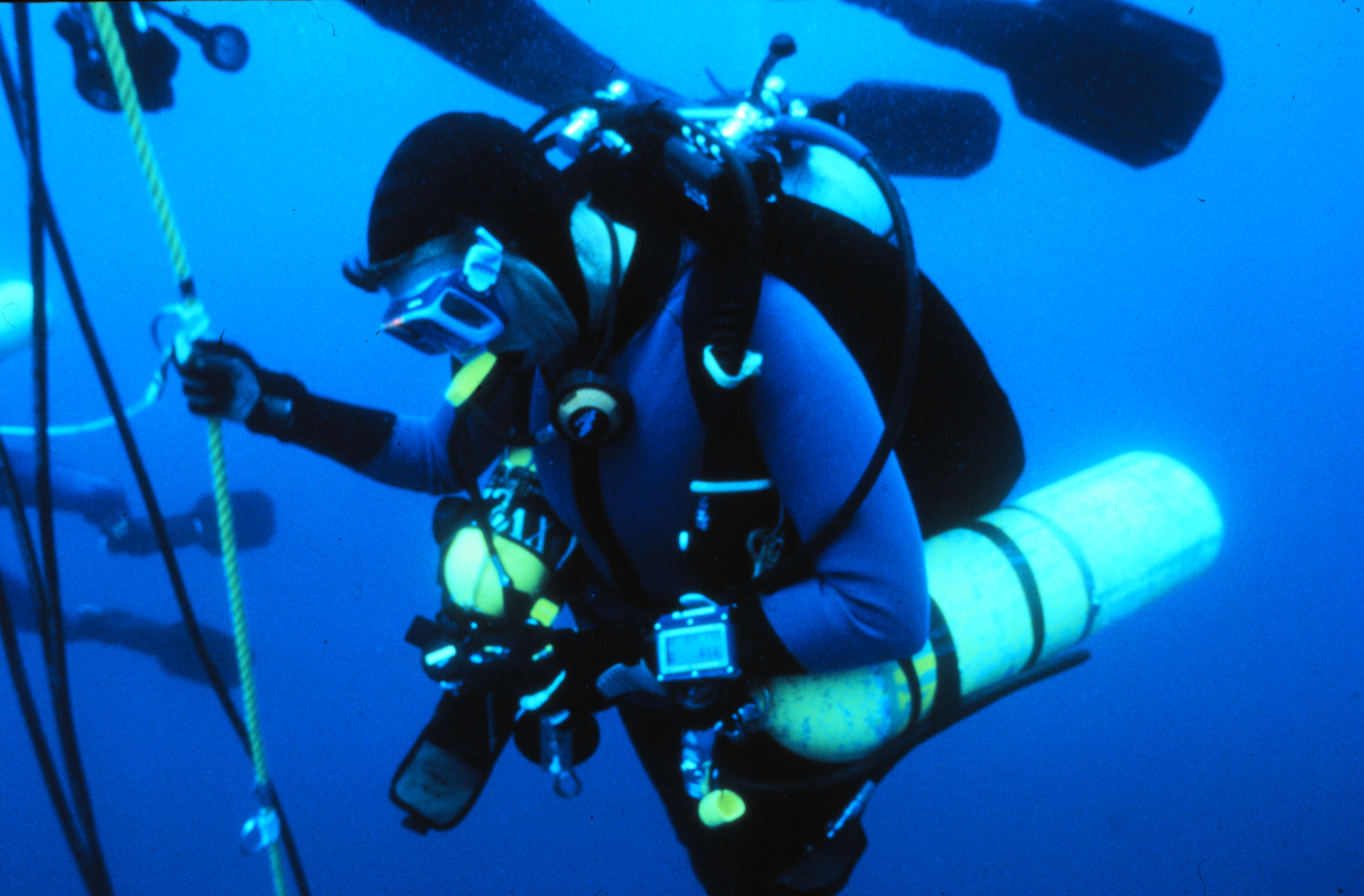
Technical diver during a decompression stop

Technical diving is recreational scuba diving that exceeds the generally accepted recreational limits, and may expose the diver to hazards beyond those normally associated with recreational diving, and to greater risks of serious injury or death. These risks may be reduced by appropriate skills, knowledge and experience, and by using suitable equipment and procedures. The term technical diving has been credited to Michael Menduno, who was editor of the (now defunct) diving magazine aquaCorps Journal. The concept and term are both relatively recent advents, although divers had already been engaging in what is now commonly referred to as technical diving for decades. In his 1989 book, Advanced Wreck Diving, author and leading technical diver, Gary Gentile, commented that there was no accepted term for divers who dived beyond agency-specified recreational limits for non-professional purposes. Revised editions use the term technical diving, and Gentile published a further book in 1999 entitled The Technical Diving Handbook.

There is some professional disagreement as to what exactly technical diving encompasses. Nitrox diving and rebreather diving were originally considered technical, but this is no longer universally the case as several certification agencies now offer recreational nitrox and recreational rebreather training and certification. Even those who agree on the broad definitions of technical diving may disagree on the precise boundaries between technical and recreational diving. One reasonably widely held definition is that any dive in which at some point of the planned profile it is not physically possible or physiologically acceptable to make a direct and uninterrupted vertical ascent to surface air is a technical dive. The equipment often involves breathing gases other than air or standard nitrox mixtures, multiple gas sources, and different equipment configurations. Over time, some equipment and techniques developed for technical diving have become more widely accepted for recreational diving.

Oxygen toxicity limits the depth reachable by underwater divers when breathing nitrox mixtures. In 1924 the US Navy started to investigate the possibility of using helium and after animal experiments, human subjects breathing heliox 20/80 (20% oxygen, 80% helium) were successfully decompressed from deep dives, followed by salvage diver Max Nohl's dive to 127 meters in 1937. and the 1939 US Navy salvage of USS Squalus. In 1963 saturation dives using trimix were made during Project Genesis, and in 1979 a research team at the Duke University Medical Center Hyperbaric Laboratory started work which identified the use of trimix to prevent High Pressure Nervous Syndrome symptoms. Cave divers started using trimix to allow deeper dives and it was used extensively in the 1987 Wakulla Springs Project and spread to the north-east American wreck diving community, and by 1994 John Chatterton and Gary Gentile, dived on the RMS Lusitania expedition to a depth of 100 meters using trimix.

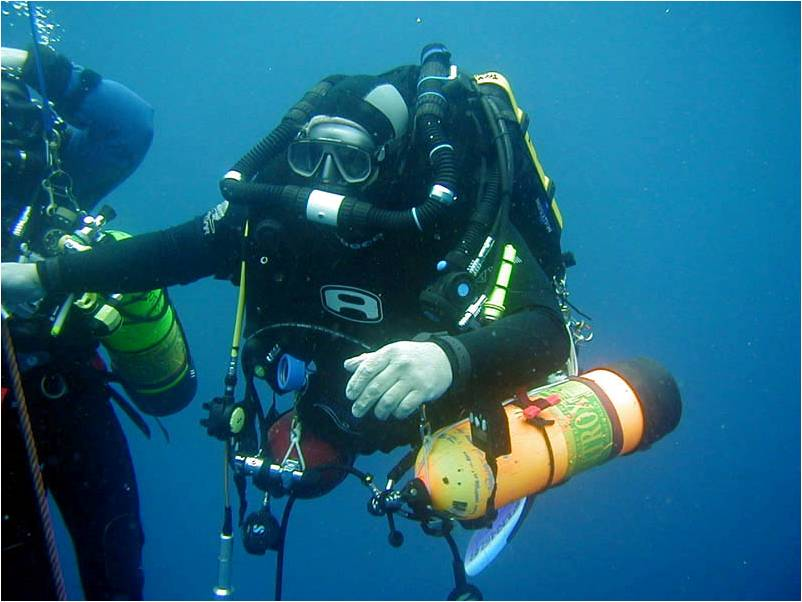
Rebreather diver returning from a 600 ft (183 m) dive

The challenges of deeper dives and longer penetrations and the large amounts of breathing gas necessary for these dive profiles reawakened interest in rebreathers. The ready availability of oxygen sensing cells beginning in the late 1980s led to a resurgence of interest in rebreather diving. By accurately measuring the partial pressure of oxygen, it became possible to maintain and accurately monitor a breathable gas mixture in the loop at any depth. In the mid-1990s semi-closed circuit rebreathers became available for the recreational scuba market, followed by closed circuit rebreathers around the turn of the millennium. Rebreathers are currently (2018) manufactured for the military, technical and recreational scuba markets.

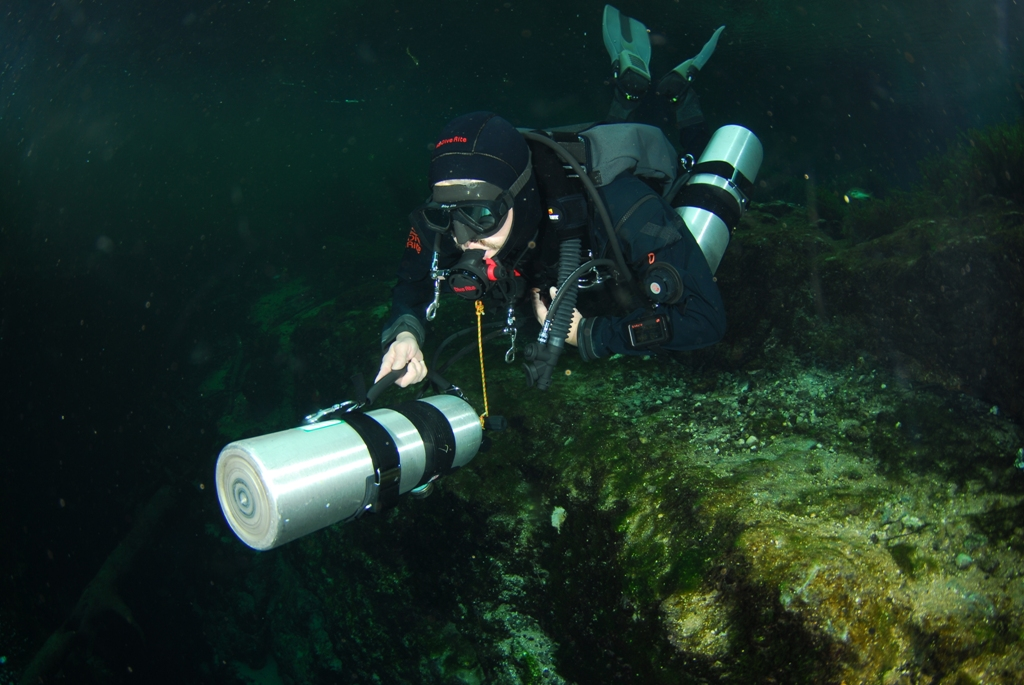
Sidemount diver pushing a cylinder in front

Sidemount is a scuba diving equipment configuration which has basic scuba sets, each comprising a single cylinder with a dedicated regulator and pressure gauge, mounted alongside the diver, clipped to the harness below the shoulders and along the hips, instead of on the back of the diver. It originated as a configuration for advanced cave diving, as it facilitates penetration of tight sections of cave, as sets can be easily removed and remounted when necessary. The configuration allows easy access to cylinder valves, and provides easy and reliable gas redundancy. These benefits for operating in confined spaces were also recognized by divers who made wreck diving penetrations. Sidemount diving is now growing in popularity within the technical diving community for general decompression diving, and has become a popular specialty for recreational diving, with several diver certification agencies offering recreational and technical level sidemount training programs.

=== Dive computers ===
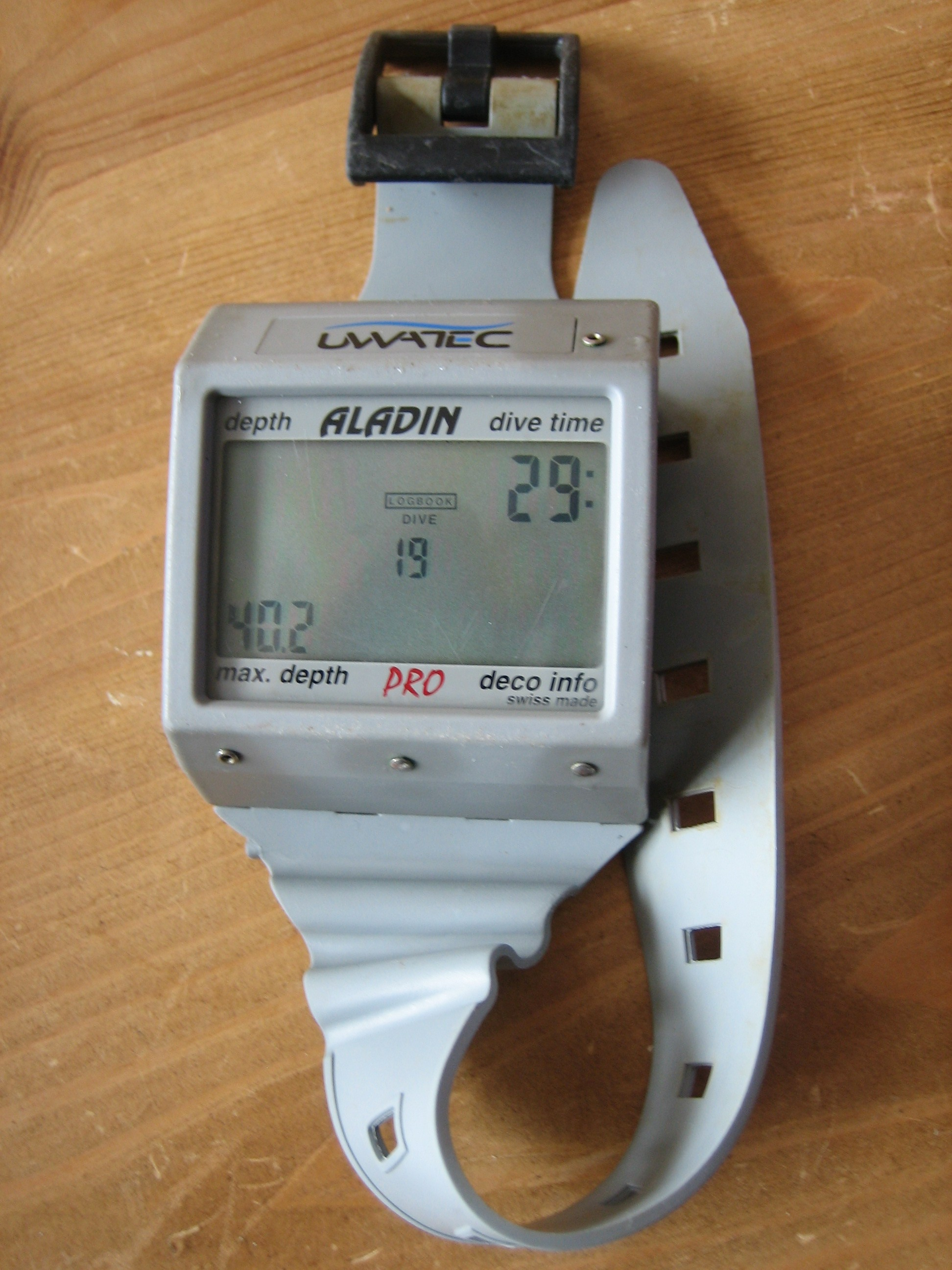
Uwatec Aladin Pro dive computer showing the log of a previous dive

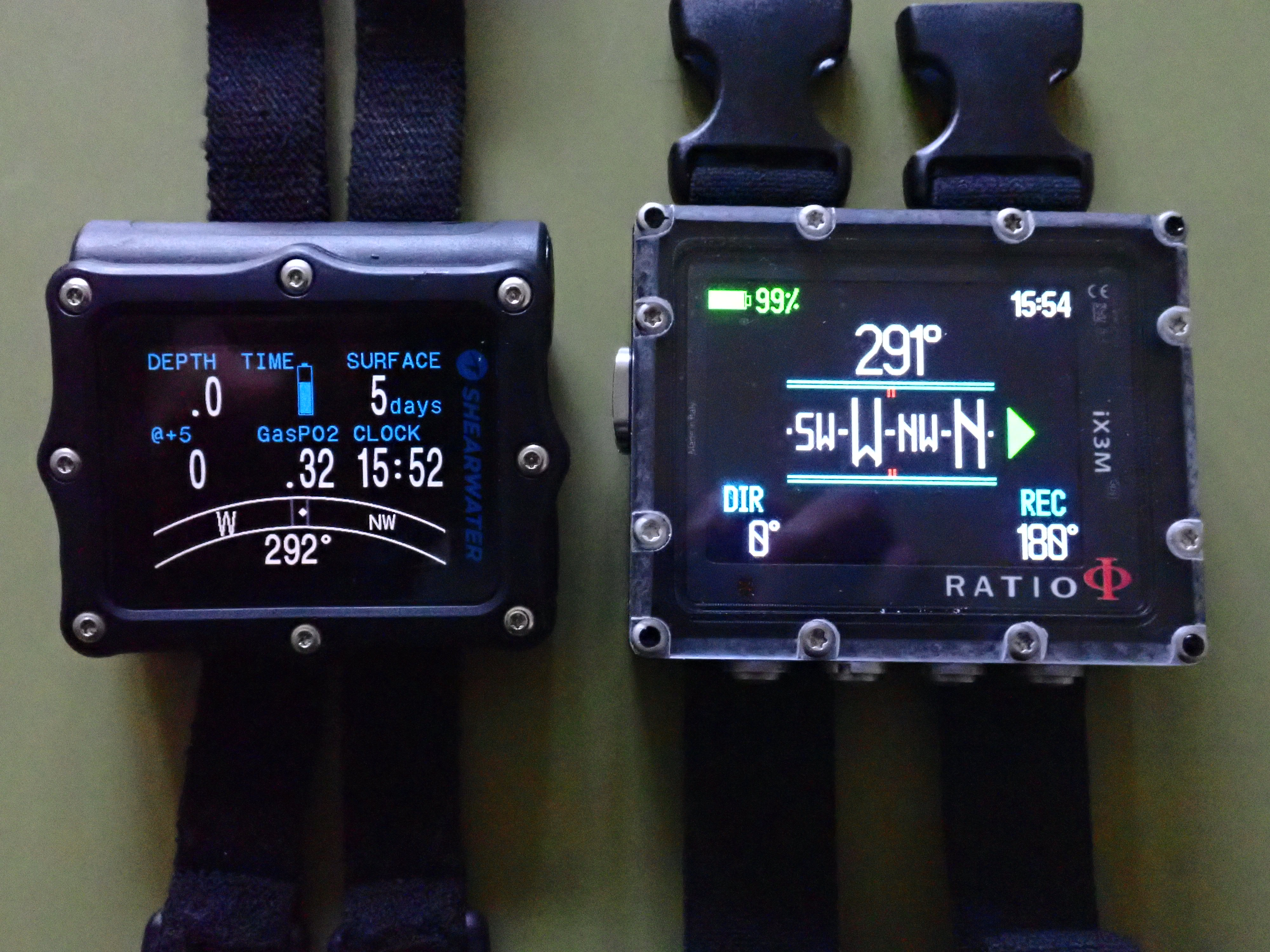
Shearwater Perdix and Ratio iX3M GPS dive computers in compass mode

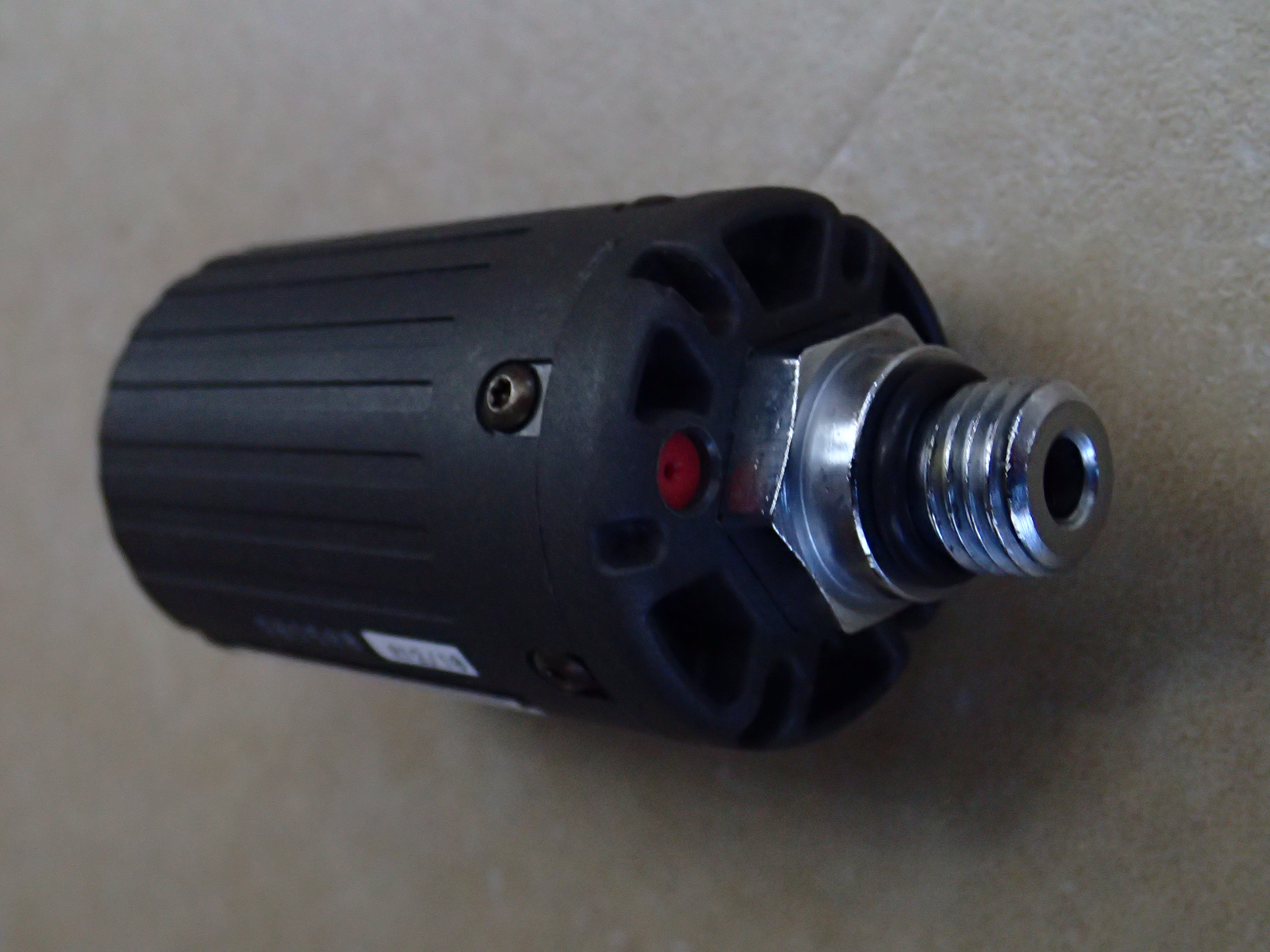
Submersible wireless pressure transducer for remote dive computer display

Scuba decompression planning originally based on printed decompression tables developed for surface supplied air diving. This was inefficient for multi-level dives, and the custom of multilevel diving using tables was not supported by formal experimental testing, but seemed to work reasonably well in practice in accordance with the theoretical models.

The Office of Naval Research funded a project with the Scripps Institute of Oceanography for the theoretical design of a prototype decompression analog computer. The Foxboro Decomputer, Mark I was manufactured by the Foxboro Company and evaluated by the US Navy Experimental Diving Unit in 1957. It was not successful.

The first recreational mechanical analogue dive computer, the "decompression meter" was designed by the Italians De Sanctis & Alinari in 1959 and built in their factory named SOS, which also made depth gauges. The device functioned so poorly that it was eventually nicknamed "bendomatic". In 1965, Stubbs and Kidd applied their decompression model to a pneumatic analogue decompression computer. Several analogue decompression meters were subsequently made, some with several bladders for illustrating the effect on various body tissues, but they were sidelined with the arrival on the scene of electronic computers.

In 1983, the Hans Hass-DecoBrain, designed by Divetronic AG a Swiss start-up, became the first digital electronic diving computer, capable of displaying the information that became the industry basic standard. The DecoBrain was based on Bühlmann's 16 compartment (ZHL-12) tissue model In 1984 development of the US Navy diving computer which was based on a 9 tissue mixed gas model used for the US Navy tables for the MK-15 rebreather was completed by Divetronic AG by adapting the Deco Brain under an R&D contract.

The 1984 Orca EDGE was produced. The EDGE displayed the ceiling or the so-called "safe-ascent-depth". A drawback was that divers faced by a ceiling did not know how long they would have to decompress, but the display featuring the saturation level of 12 tissue bars permitted experienced users to make a reasonable estimate of their decompression obligation. Orca Industries continued to refine their technology with the release of the Skinny-dipper in 1987 to do calculations for repetitive diving. They later released the Delphi computer in 1989 that included calculations for diving at altitude as well as profile recording.

Even by the late 1980s, dive computers were not widely accepted. There was a general mistrust of relying on electronics that your life might depend upon underwater. Objections ranged from dive resorts fearing the increased bottom time would upset their schedules, to divers feeling that the increased bottom time would result in many more cases of decompression sickness. A workshop held under the auspices of the American Academy of Underwater Sciences brought together a diverse group that included most of the dive computer designers and manufacturers, some of the best known hyperbaric medicine theorists and practitioners, representatives from the recreational diving agencies, the cave diving community and the scientific diving community." This workshop produced a set of consensus recommendations for the design and safe use of dive computers that was generally accepted by the scuba diving community, and consequently the opposition to dive computers dissipated, numerous new models were introduced, the technology dramatically improved and dive computers became the standard scuba diving decompression monitoring equipment.

In 2001, the US Navy approved the use of Cochran NAVY decompression computer with the VVAL 18 Thalmann algorithm for Special Warfare operations.

In 2008, the Underwater Digital Interface (UDI) was released to the market. This dive computer, based on the RGBM model, includes an underwater communication system that enables divers to transmit text messages, also featuring SOS and homing capabilities, and digital 3D compass.

Training agencies have introduced the use of dive computers as part of standard training. Wireless gas pressure displays and consumption rate calculations have been incorporated into some dive computers, which can estimate the remaining bottom time to provide easier gas management. This reduces the risk of out of gas emergencies for single mix no-stop dives. Later developments include multiple wireless transducers which can be set to the specific gas mixture in the associated cylinder, and adjust the decompression algorithm accordingly. Various other software and hardware features may be available depending on the model.

=== Industry growth ===
The recreational scuba diving industry diving experienced major growth at the end of the 20th century. The number of new divers per year has stabilised since then. Estimated 1 million new divers were certified in 2012.

Scuba diving remains a dynamic recreation – there is continuous development of equipment and practices.

Many recreational divers are trained every year, but most do not appear to dive very often. There is a large dropout rate after initial and advanced training.

Industry sectors:

- Diver training – commercialisation of training, breaking training down into smaller components for diver convenience and industry profit
- Equipment sales – wide range of equipment, catering for fashion and personal preferences as well as technical necessity, safety and effectiveness
- Consumables sales and equipment maintenance – supporting the established diver as well as the novice and occasional diver.
- Dive charters, guided dives – targeting vacationers and travellers to exotic destinations.

Professional scuba industry has much lower numbers, but higher levels of training, and a lower dropout rate. Diver motivation is greater as it is part of a job. Professional scuba numbers may be insignificant to the industry as a whole. Slightly different equipment is used. Military scuba supports some manufacturers of specialised equipment.

== Scuba training ==
Scuba training of professional and recreational divers has been separate from the earliest days, but has developed in parallel as the equipment and many of the procedures are common regardless of application. The main factor separating the two applications is occupational health and safety, which applies to professional diving, but generally not to recreational diving.

=== Professional scuba training and certification ===
Professional diving is done as a part of the work the diver is employed to do, and as such is generally subject to occupational health and safety regulation. This extends to training, certification and the associated training standards. Commercial diver training is often regulated by national or state government, so details and standards tend to vary internationally, but there are systems in place for recognition of minimum standards between jurisdictions, allowing some international portability of commercial diver certification. In some jurisdictions a distinction is made between industrial commercial diving and professional diving as part of scientific or public safety occupations, where a variety of regulatory exemptions may apply. In situations where exemptions apply, the training and certification through recreational agencies may be recognised for professional diving activities where this is not permitted for industrial commercial diving. Military diving is frequently independent of commercial diving regulation, and military diver training is usually controlled by the armed forces which employ the divers. In some cases there is recognition of military diver qualifications for work in the civilian industry, in other cases not.

The American Academy of Underwater Sciences (AAUS) is a group of scientific organizations and individual members who conduct scientific and educational activities underwater. It was organized in 1977 and incorporated in the State of California in 1983. The purpose of the AAUS is to facilitate the development of safe and productive scientific divers and scientific diving procedures through education, research, advocacy, and the advancement of the AAUS Standards for Scientific Diving Certification and Operation of Scientific Diving Programs. These are the consensual guidelines for scientific diving programs in the US, and are recognized by Occupational Safety and Health Administration as the "Standard" for scientific diving. These standards are followed by all AAUS Organizational Members allowing for reciprocity between institutions. Each institution is responsible for upholding the standards within its program and among its divers. The AAUS peer reviews the standards on a regular basis, so they represent the consensus of the scientific diving community and state-of-the-art technologies.

The CMAS Scientific committee compiled and edited the UNESCO Code of Practice for Scientific diving between 1977 and the publication of the document as Unesco technical papers in marine science 53 in 1988.

The International Diving Schools Association (IDSA) was formed in 1982 with the primary purpose of developing common international standards for commercial diver training. The Association has published basic tables for international comparison of training standards for commercial divers and some specialist non-diving qualifications such as diving supervisors, diving medical technicians and life support technicians based on consensus of members.

The International Diving Regulators Forum (IDRF) confirmed its principles and purpose at their meeting in London in September 2009. The statement of principles and purpose states "The forum has agreed to work together towards mutual recognition to identify and implement best practice in diver training and assessment with the objective of harmonising cross-border diver training outside Europe." The organisation has since changed its name to International Diving Regulators and Certifiers Forum (IDRCF) Members of the IDRF include ADAS (Australia), DCBC (Canada), HSE (UK), PSA (Norway), and the Secretariat General to the Sea Progress Committee (France).

=== Recreational scuba training and certification ===
The need for formalised training was recognised due to the high number of recreational scuba accidents. This started with informal training and led to the creation of training and certification agencies. BSAC was formed in 1953, CMAS in 1959, NASDS in 1960 NAUI in 1960 and PADI in 1966.

The sport of scuba diving had its roots among the multitude of small enthusiastic snorkelling and spearfishing clubs in the decades just before and after the Second World War. After the invention of the "aqualung" by Cousteau and Gagnan, the first commercially marketed underwater breathing apparatus became available for sale for sporting purposes in the late 1940s. In 1951, Jim Auxie Jr and Chuck Blakeslee started a magazine called The Skin Diver (later renamed Skin Diver Magazine). Neal Earl Hess, who had been teaching divers for two years, contributed to its column "The Instructors Corner", to inform readers about scuba. He soon established a column called "The National Diving Patrol" as a section to name new skin and scuba diving "instructors". Still, no official training and certifying agency existed, except for the training and resources provided by the military (Underwater Demolition Teams) and dive clubs.

Graduate students Conrad Limbaugh and Andy Rechnitzer used two of the first aqualungs brought to the US in 1948 on the California coast and enrolled at Scripps Institution of Oceanography in 1950, where they informally tutored some of their colleagues. After a student diver at another university died in a scuba accident in 1952, Scripps administration got Limbaugh to produce the first formal scuba training manual and course in the US. Training and emergency procedures such as the buddy system, buddy breathing, and scuba ditch and recovery were introduced and developed by Limbaugh and Rechnitzer. They workshopped possible emergencies and developed workable responses, which became standard practice for professional and recreational scuba diving. Ditching scuba equipment and recovering it from the bottom were done as psychological preparation for emergencies. Stress training by subjecting the trainee to emergencies by knocking off masks and mouthpieces underwater and closing off air supplies were used as a way to assess reaction to stress and accustom the diver to responding promptly and usefully to an emergency. The buddy system was established as a useful way to help manage an emergency by having a competent person to assist. Rechnitzer claims to have suggested the buddy system to Hanauer, and they followed up by developing a workable buddy breathing system for the twin-hose regulator. Some of these practices were later modified or dropped from training when equipment changed, or they were seen as obstacles to expanding the recreational diving industry. Others remained, or were retained by some training organisations as they were considered to produce a more resilient diver.

In 1952, Al Tillman, the director of sports for the Los Angeles County Department of Parks and Recreation, wrote a letter to Parks and Recreation director Paul Gruendyke stating that: "A new sport—skin diving—is becoming popular in the area. Recently while diving in Palos Verdes, I ran into several divers in the water with me who didn't know what they were doing. One had one of the new underwater breathing units that allows divers to stay under for long periods of time... I propose that my department get involved in this sport and provide training classes. I believe that diving will grow in the future and we have an obligation to make the sport as safe as possible."

On 15 October 1953, the British Sub-Aqua Club (BSAC) was founded by Oscar Gugen, Peter Small, Mary Small, and Trevor Hampton.

The Los Angeles County Department of Parks and Recreation sent three representatives—Al Tillman, Bev Morgan and Ramsey Parks—to take Limbaugh's course in 1954. They subsequently started training recreational scuba divers, making this the first scuba instructor training in America. In 1955, Tillman and L.A. County lifeguard Bev Morgan created the L.A. County Parks and Recreational Underwater Instructor Certification Course (1UICC) in an effort to respond to the growing number of diver requests. It was the world's first civilian training program to certify recreational divers, and soon began granting Provisional Certification to instructors across the country.

As the new sport of scuba diving rapidly expanded through the 1950s, several sporting organisations – notably the YMCA – began programmes to train swimming enthusiasts in this new aquatic pastime and began to codify what were believed to be the proper practices needed for this expanding amateur sport. The YMCA formed a committee to produce a training manual—"The New Science of Skin and Scuba Diving", which was first published in 1957, and in 1959 conducted the first national instructor training program.

In the 1960 May issue of Skin Diver Magazine, The National Diving Patrol was announced as an official, national organization. Its purpose and function was "to insure competent underwater instruction and to reduce diving accidents through education." In 1959, its name changed to the National Association of Underwater Instructors (NAUI). In October 1961, NAUI was incorporated in the State of California as a non-profit educational organization, with Al Tillman as the President and Neal Hess as the Executive Secretary. In 1966 Ralph Ericson and John Cronin formed the Professional Association of Diving Instructors (PADI) in response to a perception that the existing system was not sufficiently responsive to the needs of inland diving instructors. A further split occurred in 1960 with the creation of the National Association of Scuba Diving Schools (NASDS) by John Gaffney and a group of diving equipment retailers, followed by a split from NASDS led by Bob Clark to form Scuba Schools International (SSI) in 1970.

The Florida Skin Divers Association was formed from a group of local scuba diving clubs in 1952. In 1976 their scuba training committee split from FSDA to form the International Diving Educators Association (IDEA).

Early scuba training included a large component of theory provided by classroom instruction, which could include more than 30 hours of physics, equipment mechanics and other theoretical aspects of diving knowledge. The skills training included fitness, watermanship skills and stress-management training, where staff would put the trainee through in-water situations simulating the most likely emergency situations, so that the divers would be more likely to manage real-life emergencies with composure. Much of this training was, and still is, part of commercial and military diver training. This training required the diver to show competence at both routine procedures and managing reasonably foreseeable emergencies—much the same requirement that persists for certification of professional divers. This approach could be justified by the unsophisticated equipment in use, which could be, and often was, serviced by the diver, and was more prone to malfunctions than later generation equipment. Current standard equipment such as submersible pressure gauges, buoyancy compensators and decompression computers were not available, and the recreational diver was obliged to avoid decompression illness by planning the dive and monitoring the planned dive using a diving watch, simple depth gauge, and decompression tables, sometimes shared with a companion. In the event of an equipment malfunction, the diver was unsupported except by a diving companion. This required a level of competence and discipline that is no longer considered essential for recreational diving by most certification agencies.

By the late 1960s equipment was becoming more reliable, and the recreational diver was less likely to experience malfunctions, but the training remained much the same. An increased interest in diving among the general public, and the commercial drive to sell more equipment and training began to change the content and methods of training to a more widely marketable model in the mid-1970s. This included expanding the training to include open-water experience, which was previously not a universal requirement. By the 1970s a second open-water checkout was standard, and more were subsequently added in recognition that training in the actual environment where the skills will be used is important to develop competence. By the 1980s the current minimum requirement for open water diving of four training dives was well established.

At the same time, classroom and confined water instruction changed to adapt to the changes on equipment, and to de-emphasise fundamental theory in favour of practical applications more likely to be useful in the expected range of experience for a recreational diver. The general acceptance of the buoyancy compensator, submersible pressure gauge, and alternate air supply in the form of a secondary demand valve as standard equipment changed the preferred emergency procedures for handling out-of-air emergencies, which were simpler to learn as well as reducing the risk. The buoyancy compensator also allowed training to focus on better buoyancy control and alternative methods of establishing appropriate buoyancy. Stress management was de-emphasised, and skills training concentrated on learning the standardised skill set known to be effective most of the time. These changes helped to allow a wider range of potential divers to enter the market.

The buddy system had been thought to be a useful corollary to the "never swim alone" edicts of the YMCA swimming and lifesaving programmes. Cousteau himself independently implemented a buddy system from the earliest days of exploratory diving after a number of diving incidents. The buddy system did indeed have some very useful aspects: the cross checking of equipment before dives, the facilitating of assistance for possible entanglement problems or equipment failures, and the enhancement of the social nature of diving. The YMCA continued as a major force in the development of diver certification during the first 50 years of this new sport. When these programmes were adopted by the emerging scuba certification agencies such as BS-AC, NAUI and PADI, the practice of buddy diving led to one of the two main mantras of recreational scuba: "never hold your breath" and "never dive alone".

An international congress of fifteen diving federations representing all underwater disciplines met in Brussels on 28 September 1958. National delegates attended from Belgium, Brazil, France, Federal Republic of Germany, Greece, Italy, Monaco, Portugal, Switzerland, the United Kingdom, the United States of America and the former Yugoslavia. Following a decision at that congress, a meeting was held in Monaco on 9–11 January 1959, which officially established the World Underwater Federation, with an acronym CMAS based on its French title Confédération Mondiale des Activités Subaquatiques.

The Professional Association of Diving Instructors (PADI) is a recreational diving membership and diver training organization founded in 1966 by John Cronin and Ralph Erickson. Cronin was originally a NAUI instructor who decided to form his own organization with Erickson, and to break diver training down into several modular courses instead of the single universal course then prevalent. Diving Science and Technology Corporation (DSAT), the development arm for the Recreational Dive Planner and PADI's Tec-Rec program, was founded in November 1986.

Dick Rutkowski, previously a dive supervisor for the National Oceanic and Atmospheric Administration (NOAA), formed the International Association of Nitrox Divers (IAND) in 1985 to teach the use of nitrox, which had been pioneered by NOAA, to recreational divers. In 1992 the name was changed to the International Association of Nitrox and Technical Divers (IANTD).

Technical Diving International (TDI) was founded in 1994 by Bret Gilliam, and others after a split from IANTD in 1993 to provide training for specialized diving situations. TDI courses include open circuit Nitrox, Trimix and Rebreather courses, and training for overhead environments like caves and wrecks. In 1998, International Training started a sister organization to TDI known as Scuba Diving International (SDI) focusing on recreational scuba and in 2000, Emergency Response Diving International (ERDI) to teach public safety diving.

Following the recognition that solo diving does occur, is acceptably safe to many divers, and is a relatively common practice, Scuba Diving International (SDI) started Solo diving training and certification in 1999.

In 2006 BSAC was the first recreational diving agency to introduce Nitrox diving as part of core training.

Internationally recognised minimum training standards for recreational divers have been published by: RSTC, WRSTC, CMAS, ISO etc.(Rebreather training council?)

The US Recreational Scuba Training Council (RSTC) was created in 1986 as a permanent body to sustain a relationship between various recreational diving training organisations. In 1991, it replaced the Diving Equipment Manufacturers Association (DEMA) (renamed as the Diving Equipment and Marketing Association in 1998) as the secretariat for the then American National Standards Institute (ANSI) committee for underwater safety (also known as the Z86 Committee). The Z86 committee was subsequently replaced by the committee for Diving Instructional Standards and Safety (also known as the Z375 committee). In 2007 it retained its appointment as the ANSI Accredited Standards Developer (ASD) for the Z375 committee.

The US RSTC has been responsible for the development of a standard medical statement (in conjunction with the Undersea and Hyperbaric Medical Society) and minimum training standards for diving hand signals and the following recreational diver grades—Introductory Scuba Experience, Supervised Diver, Open Water Diver, Enriched Air Nitrox Certification, Entry level Rescue Diver, Dive Supervisor, Assistant Instructor, Scuba Instructor and Scuba Instructor Trainer for member agencies.

The World Recreational Scuba Training Council (WRSTC) was founded in 1999 to create minimum recreational diving training standards for the various scuba diving certification agencies across the world which are members. The WRSTC restricts its membership to national or regional councils. These councils consist of individual training organizations who collectively represent at least 50% of the annual diver certifications in the member council's country or region. A national council is referred to as a RSTC (Recreational Scuba Training Council).

The International Organization for Standardization (ISO) published minimum standards in 2007 (superseded by 2014 revisions) for:

- ISO 24801-1:2014 Recreational diving services – Requirements for the training of recreational scuba divers – Part 1: Level 1 – Supervised diver,
- ISO 24801-2:2014 Recreational diving services – Requirements for the training of recreational scuba divers – Part 2: Level 2 – Autonomous diver,
- ISO 11107 – 'Nitrox diving'
- ISO 24801-3:2014 Recreational diving services – Requirements for the training of recreational scuba divers – Part 3: Level 3 – Dive leader,
- ISO 24802-1:2014 Recreational diving services – Requirements for the training of scuba instructors – Part 1: Level 1, and ISO 24802-2:2014 Recreational diving services – Requirements for the training of scuba instructors – Part 2: Level 2

== Research into scuba diver safety ==
The non-profit Divers Alert Network (DAN) was founded at Duke University in 1980 to promote safe diving. and has expanded into a global group of not-for-profit organisations providing safety and insurance services to members and maintaining databases on diving accidents. They publish research results and collaborate with other organizations on projects of common interest, mostly regarding scuba diving safety.

Project Stickybeak was a privately run collation of data on diving fatalities in the Asia Pacific region run by Douglas Walker for several years, with annual reports on fatality statistics. In 2007 Project Stickybeak was incorporated into the DAN Asia-Pacific data collection and dive accident reporting project.

The British Sub-Aqua Club publishes an annual report of diving incidents.

== History of specific fields of application for scuba diving ==
=== Military diving ===
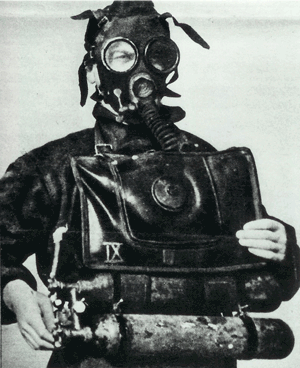
Italian World War II frogman of "Gruppo Gamma"

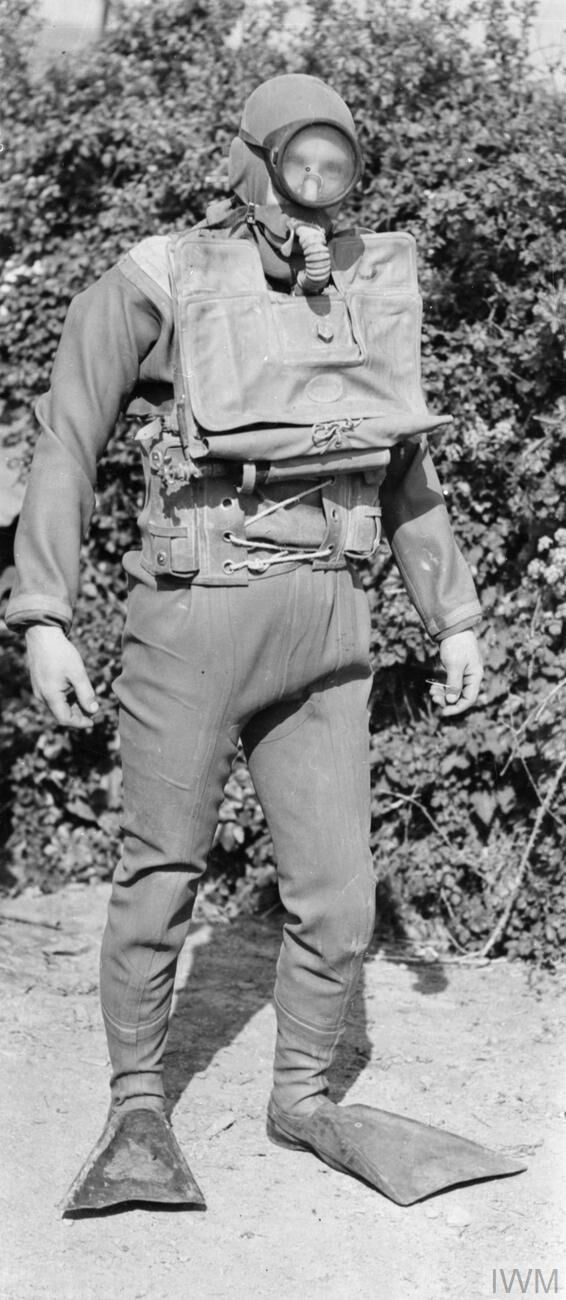
A 1945 British navy frogman with complete gear, including the Davis apparatus, a rebreather originally conceived in 1910 by Robert Davis as an emergency submarine escape set.

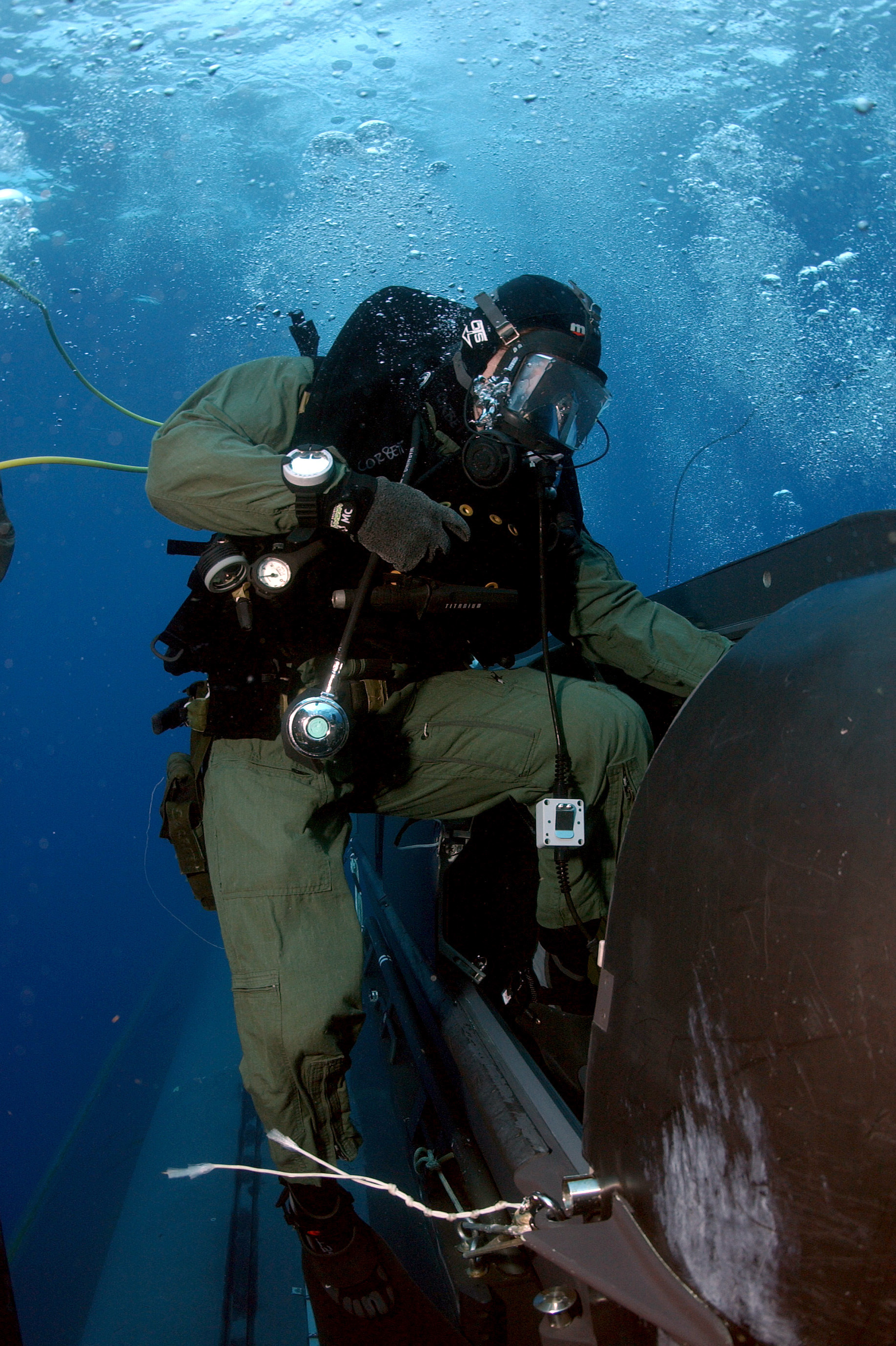
A SEAL Delivery Team member climbs aboard a delivery vehicle before launching from the back of the submarine USS Philadelphia.

The first modern military scuba divers were the World War II Italian commando frogmen, of Decima Flottiglia MAS (now "ComSubIn": Comando Raggruppamento Subacquei e Incursori Teseo Tesei) which formed in 1938 and was first in action in 1940. Originally these divers were called "Uomini Gamma" because they were members of the top secret special unit called "Gruppo Gamma", which originated from the kind of Pirelli rubber skin-suit nicknamed muta gamma used by these divers. Later they were nicknamed "Uomini Rana", Italian for "frog men" This special corps used an early oxygen rebreather scuba set, the Auto Respiratore ad Ossigeno (A.R.O), a development of the Dräger oxygen self-contained breathing apparatus designed for the mining industry and of the Davis Submerged Escape Apparatus made by Siebe, Gorman & Co and by Bergomi, designed for escaping from sunken submarines. The Italian frogmen trained in La Spezia, Liguria, using swimfins, rubber dry suit, and the new A.R.O. scuba unit. After Italy declared war, the Decima Flottiglia MAS (Xª MAS) attempted several attacks on British naval bases in the Mediterranean between June 1940 and July 1941, but none was successful, because of equipment failure or early detection by British forces. On September 10, 1941, eight Xª MAS frogmen were inserted by submarine close to the British harbour at Gibraltar, where using human torpedoes to penetrate the defences, sank three merchant ships with limpet mines before escaping through neutral Spain. An even more successful attack, the Raid on Alexandria, was mounted on 19 December on the harbour at Alexandria, again using human torpedoes. The raid resulted in disabling the battleships HMS Queen Elizabeth and HMS Valiant together with a destroyer and an oil tanker, but all six frogmen were captured.

The British Royal Navy had captured an Italian human torpedo during a failed attack on Malta; they developed a copy called the Chariot and formed a unit called the Experimental Submarine Flotilla, which later merged with the Special Boat Service. A number of Chariot operations were attempted, most notably Operation Title in October 1942, an attack on the German battleship Tirpitz, which had to be abandoned when a storm hit the fishing boat which was towing the Chariots into position. The last and most successful British operation resulted in sinking two liners in Phuket harbour in Thailand in October 1944.

An oxygen rebreather set called the Lambertsen Amphibious Respirator Unit (LARU) was invented in the United States 1939 by Christian Lambertsen, and was patented in 1940. Lambertsen later renamed it the Self Contained Underwater Breathing Apparatus, which, contracted to SCUBA, eventually became the generic term for both open circuit and rebreather autonomous underwater breathing equipment. Lambertson demonstrated it to the Office of Strategic Services (OSS) after being rejected by the U.S. Navy OSS not only bought into the concept, they hired Dr. Lambertsen to lead the program and build-up the dive element of their maritime unit. The OSS was the predecessor of the Central Intelligence Agency and the maritime element still exists inside their Special Activities Division.

The Shayetet 13 commandos of the Israeli Navy have carried out a number of underwater raids on harbors. They were initially trained by veterans of Xª MAS and used Italian equipment. As part of Operation Raviv in 1969, eight frogmen used two human torpedoes to enter Ras Sadat naval base near Suez, where they destroyed two motor torpedo boats with mines.

During the 1982 Falklands War, the Argentinian Naval Intelligence Service planned an attack on British warships at Gibraltar. Code named Operation Algeciras, three frogmen, recruited from a former anti-government insurgent group, were to plant mines on the ships' hulls. The operation was abandoned when the divers were arrested by Spanish police and deported.

In 1985, the French nuclear weapons tests at Moruroa in the Pacific Ocean was being contested by environmental protesters led by the Greenpeace campaign ship, Rainbow Warrior. The Action Division of the French Directorate-General for External Security devised a plan to sink the Rainbow Warrior while it was berthed in harbor at Auckland in New Zealand. Two divers from the Division posed as tourists and attached two limpet mines to the ship's hull; the resulting explosion sank the ship and killed a Netherlands citizen on board. Two agents from the team, but not the divers, were arrested by the New Zealand Police and later convicted of manslaughter. The French government finally admitted responsibility two months later.

In 1989, during the U.S. invasion of Panama, a team of four U.S. Navy SEALs using rebreathers conducted a combat swimmer attack on the Presidente Porras, a gunboat and yacht belonging to Manuel Noriega. The commandos attached explosives to the vessel as it was tied to a pier in the Panama Canal, escaping only after being attacked with grenades. Three years later during Operation Restore Hope, members of SEAL Team One swam to shore in Somalia to measure beach composition, water depth, and shore gradient ahead of a Marine landing.

=== Scientific diving ===
Before the development of scuba, scientists were making underwater observations of the marine environment using snorkels, freediving, and surface-supplied diving equipment. By the middle of the 20th century, scientific diving was being done around the U.S. in surface-supplied shallow water helmets and standard diving dress. During WWII Jacques Cousteau and Frédéric Dumas used the Aqua-Lung for underwater archaeology to excavate a large mound of amphorae near Grand Congloué, an island near Marseilles.

In 1949 Conrad Limbaugh introduced scientific scuba diving at Scripps Institution of Oceanography. While a doctoral student in 1954 he became Scripps' first diving safety officer, his research diving course was the first civilian diver training programme in the U.S. and he wrote the first scientific diving manual. Limbaugh and researcher Andreas Rechnitzer purchased an Aqua-lung when they became available, and taught themselves to use it, as no formal training was available. They introduced the equipment to Scripps researchers in 1950, and it was found suitable for making direct observations and to conduct experiments underwater. In 1951, after the death of two of their scientific divers, Scripps decided that there was a need for formalized scientific diver training, and in 1954 instituted the first formal scientific diving program in the U.S. At the request of the University of California Office of the President, the divers at Scripps developed the first "University Guide for Diving Safety," which was initially published in March 1967.

In the 1950s through 1970s scientific diving in the U.S. was conducted by various organizations using similar but informal self-regulated standards. In 1975 the United Brotherhood of Carpenters and Joiners of America petitioned for an emergency temporary standard be issued with respect to occupational diving operations. The ETS issued on June 15, 1976, was to be effective from July 15 but was challenged in the U.S. Court of Appeals by several diving contractors, and was withdrawn in November 1976. A permanent standard for commercial diving became effective on 20 October 1977, but it did not consider the needs of scientific diving. The scientific diving community was unable to operate as previously, and in 1977 united to form the American Academy of Underwater Sciences (AAUS) After extensive negotiation and congressional hearings, a partial exemption to the commercial diving standards was issued in 1982, and was re-examined in 1984, leading to the final guidelines for the exemption which became effective in 1985 (Federal Register, Vol. 50, No. 6, p. 1046)

Dr Richard Pyle has pioneered US development of diving standards for scientific projects at greater depths since the 1990s, using closed circuit rebreathers, which has opened up learning about an extended range of ecological zones and their biota.

=== Recreational diving ===
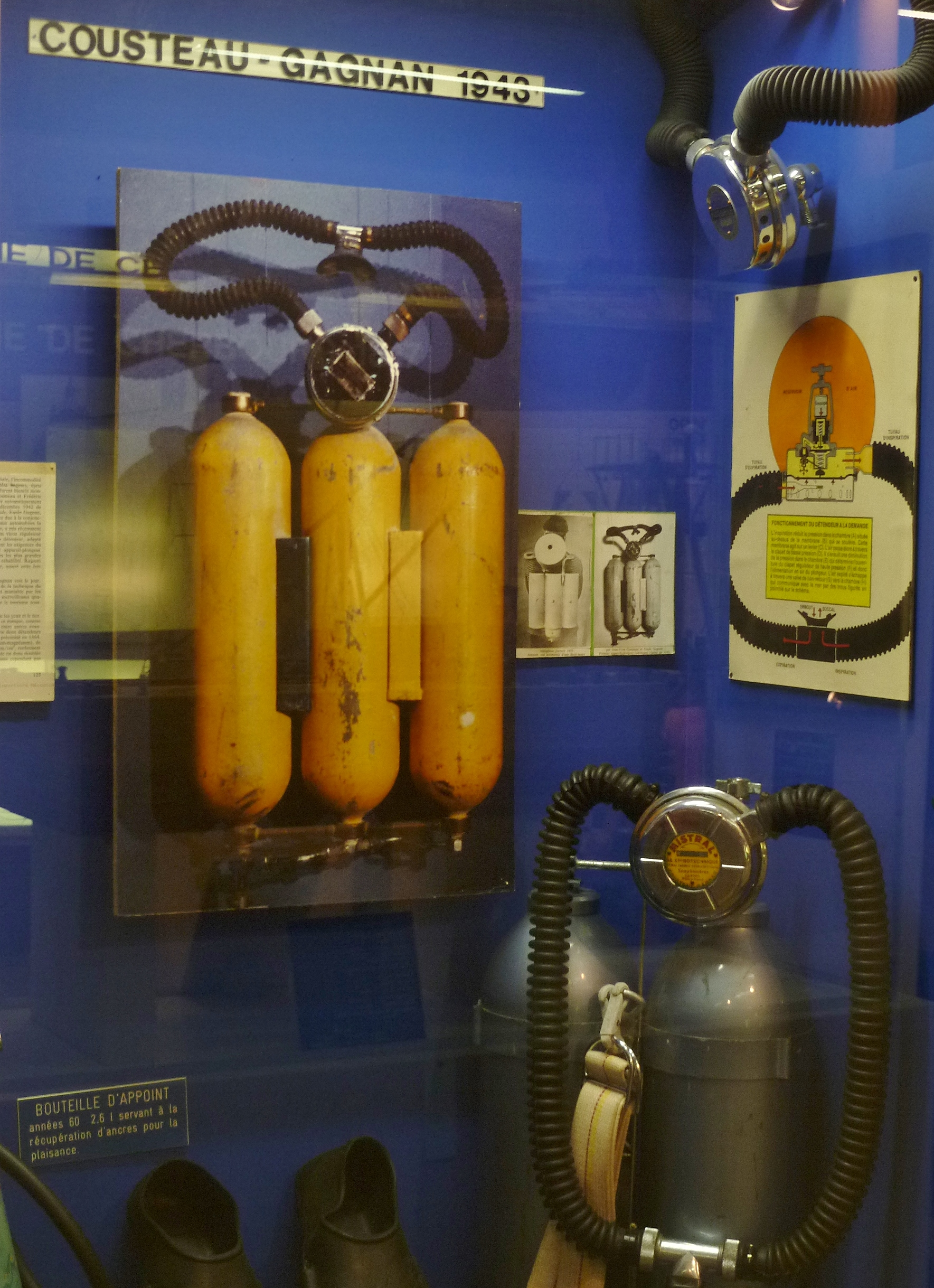
The invention of the aqua-lung in 1943 led to modern recreational diving

Recreational scuba diving grew out of related activities such as snorkeling and underwater hunting. For a long time, recreational underwater excursions were limited by breath-hold time. The invention of the aqualung in 1943 by Émile Gagnan and Jacques-Yves Cousteau and the wetsuit in 1952 by University of California, Berkeley physicist, Hugh Bradner and its development over subsequent years led to a revolution in recreational diving. However, for much of the 1950s and early 1960s, recreational scuba diving was a sport limited to those who were able to afford or make their own kit, and prepared to undergo relatively intensive training to use it.

As the sport became more popular, manufacturers became aware of the potential market, and equipment began to appear that was easier to use, more affordable and more reliable. Continued advances in scuba technology, such as buoyancy compensators, improved diving regulators, wetsuits and improved dry suits, and dive computers, increased the safety, comfort and convenience of the equipment, and less intensive training programmes encouraged more people to learn to use it.

Until the early 1950s, navies and other organizations performing professional diving were the only providers of diver training, and only for their own personnel and only using their own types of equipment. There were no formal training courses available to civilians who bought the early scuba equipment. The first recreational scuba diving school was opened in France to train the owners of the Cousteau and Gagnan designed twin-hose scuba. The first school to teach single hose scuba was started in 1953, in Melbourne, Australia, at the Melbourne City Baths. Royal Australian Navy Commander Batterham organized the school to assist the inventor of the single hose regulator, Ted Eldred. However, neither of these schools was international in nature.

Some of the first civilian training started in 1952 at the Scripps Institution of Oceanography where Andy Rechnitzer, Bob Dill and Connie Limbaugh taught the first scuba courses in the United States, then in 1953 Trevor Hampton started the first British diving school, the British Underwater Centre and in 1954 when Los Angeles County created an Underwater Instructor Certification Course based on the training that they received from the scientific divers of the Scripps Institution of Oceanography. Early instruction developed in the format of amateur teaching within a club environment, as exemplified by organizations such as the Scottish Sub Aqua Club and the British Sub Aqua Club from 1953, Los Angeles County from 1954 and the YMCA from 1959.

Professional instruction started in 1959 when the non-profit NAUI was formed, which later effectively was split, to form the for-profit PADI in 1966. The National Association of Scuba Diving Schools (NASDS) started with their dive center based training programs in 1960 followed by SSI in 1970. Professional Diving Instructors College was formed in 1965, changing its name in 1984 to Professional Diving Instructors Corporation (PDIC).

In 2009 PADI alone issued approximately 950,000 diving certifications. Approximately 550,000 of these certifications were "entry level" certifications and the remainder were more advanced certifications.

Scuba-diving has become a popular leisure activity, and many diving destinations have some form of dive shop presence that can offer air fills, equipment sale, rental and repair, and training. In tropical and sub-tropical parts of the world, there is a large market for 'holiday divers'; people who train and dive while on holiday, but rarely dive close to home.

Technical diving and the use of rebreathers are increasing, particularly in areas of the world where deeper wreck diving is the main underwater attraction. Generally, recreational diving depths are limited by the training agencies to a maximum of between 30 and 40 meters (98 and 131 ft), beyond which a variety of safety issues such as oxygen toxicity and nitrogen narcosis significantly increase the risk of diving using recreational diving equipment and practices, and specialized skills and equipment for technical diving are needed.

=== Solo diving ===
The history of solo diving stands in stark contrast to the relatively new concept of buddy diving that was developed for scientific and recreational diving in the mid-20th century. Artifacts dating back some 4,500 years provide evidence of solo diving for food and commerce by the ancient people of Mesopotamia.

Freedivers traditionally dive alone or with an attendant on the surface to assist with the harvest; many of the early diving bells were only large enough for a single occupant. When surface supplied diving was first developed, it was common to have only one diver unless the work required more. Those early traditions continue and customarily now include a standby diver, and a working diver who is in constant communication with the surface control crew. The sport of scuba diving is rooted in a multitude of small enthusiastic snorkeling and spearfishing clubs that date back to the decades just before and after World War II. In the late 1940s, after the invention of the Aqua-lung by Cousteau and Gagnan, the first retail underwater breathing apparatus for sport was commercially marketed. As the sport expanded through the 1950s, several sporting organisations – notably the Young Men's Christian Association (YMCA) – began scuba training programmes for swimming enthusiasts, thus began the codification of what was believed to be proper practices for the expanding amateur sport of scuba diving. The buddy system was thought to be a useful corollary to the "never swim alone" edicts of the YMCA swimming and lifesaving programmes. Cousteau independently implemented a buddy system after a number of harrowing diving incidents that date back to the earliest days of exploratory scuba diving. The buddy system's useful aspects have long been established, including the cross-checking of equipment before dives, the facilitating of assistance for possible entanglement problems or equipment failures, and enhancement of the social nature of diving. The YMCA was a substantial influence in the development of diver certification during the first 50 years of the sport. As various scuba programmes were adopted by emerging scuba certification agencies, such as the National Association of Underwater Instructors (NAUI), Professional Association of Diving Instructors (PADI), and British Sub-Aqua Club (BSAC), the practise of buddy diving inspired one of the two main mantras of recreational scuba: "never hold your breath" and "never dive alone".

By the early to mid-1990s, solo divers became more visible and increasingly open about their alternative dive safety philosophy, despite the recreational industry's established adherence to the buddy system. It wasn't until 2001 that Scuba Diving International (SDI) initiated formal certification training specifically for solo diving. Several other agencies eventually followed suit with certificates titled Self-reliant Diver and variations of that theme; all with the intention of improving diver competence without necessarily going solo, and recognising that the buddy system does not always comply with the ideal. At the 2012 "Rebreather Forum 3", a significant minority of attendees were of the opinion that, in some circumstances, it would be acceptable to dive solo on rebreathers.

=== Cave diving ===
The exploration of underwater parts of caves was started using surface supplied equipment before scuba became available. Jacques-Yves Cousteau, co-inventor of the first commercially successful open circuit scuba equipment, is claimed to have been the world's first open circuit scuba cave diver.The first self-contained cave divers were Graham Balcombe and Jack Shepherd, two founding members of Britain's Cave Diving Group (CDG) which is the oldest remaining diving organization in the world. They made the dive in 1936, using an oxygen cylinder and a respirator assembled with bicycle parts.

Two regions have had particular influence on cave diving techniques and equipment due to their very different cave diving environments. These are the United Kingdom, and USA, mainly Florida.

==== UK history ====
The number of sites where standard diving dress could be used is limited and there was little progress before the outbreak of World War II reduced the caving community considerably. The development of underwater warfare made a lot of surplus equipment available after the war. The Cave Diving Group re-formed in 1946 and progress was rapid. Typical equipment at this time was a frogman rubber diving suit for insulation (water temperature in the UK is typically 4 °C), a closed circuit oxygen rebreather and an "Apparatus For Laying Out Line And Underwater Navigation", developed between 1946 and 1949. The "AFLOLAUN" consisted of battery powered lights, line-reel, compass, depth gauge, notebook (for the survey), and occasionally other equipment.

Progress was typically by "bottom walking", as this was considered less dangerous than swimming in the absence of buoyancy control. The use of oxygen put a depth limit on the dives. This was the normal procedure until approximately 1960 when new techniques using wetsuits and open-circuit scuba sets were introduced. The development of side mounting cylinders, helmet-mounted lights and free-swimming with fins increased accessibility, and the increasing capacity and pressure rating of air cylinders extended dive durations. The conception of inflation in dry suits added the buoyancy control to make "bottom walking" obsolete. By 1990, use of mixed nitrox gas further increased acceptable bottom times. A decade later underwater devices like long range scooters were developed, allowing divers to explore caves further than before.

==== US history ====
In the 1970s, cave diving greatly increased in popularity among divers in the United States. However, there were very few experienced cave divers and almost no formal classes to handle the surge in interest. The result was a large number of divers trying to cave dive without any formal training. This resulted in more than 100 fatalities over the course of the decade. The state of Florida came close to banning SCUBA diving around the cave entrances. The cave diving organizations responded to the problem by creating training programs and certifying instructors, in addition to other measures to try to prevent these fatalities. This included posting signs, adding no-lights rules, and other enforcements.

The cave diving pioneer Sheck Exley explored many underwater cave systems in Florida, and elsewhere in the US and the rest of the world. On 6 February 1974, Exley became the first chairman of the Cave Diving Section of the National Speleological Society.

Since the 1980s, cave diving education has greatly reduced diver fatalities, and it is now uncommon for a certified cave diver to die in an underwater cave. Also in the 1980s, refinements were made to the equipment used for cave diving, most importantly better lights with smaller batteries. In the 1990s, cave diving equipment configurations became more standardized, due mostly to the adaptation and popularization of the backplate and wing based "Hogarthian Rig", developed in North Florida, which keeps equipment configurations simple and streamlined.

Documentary films made by Wesley C. Skiles, Jill Heinerth and others, have contributed to the increasing popularity of cave diving in the early 21st century.

=== Diving on shipwrecks and other sunken structures ===
Wreck diving is recreational diving where the wreckage of ships, aircraft and other artificial structures are explored. Although most wreck dive sites are at shipwrecks, there is an increasing trend to scuttle retired ships to create artificial reef sites. Diving to crashed aircraft can also be considered wreck diving. The recreation of wreck diving makes no distinction as to how the vessel ended up on the bottom, and the purpose is for the entertainment of the diver.

Some wreck diving involves penetration of the wreckage, making a direct ascent to the surface impossible for a part of the dive.

The scientific discipline of underwater archaeology also involves diving on shipwrecks, but in this field, the intention is to collect data or preserve artifacts.

Marine salvage is the recovery of wreckage, artifacts and material from shipwrecks and other underwater sites, for commercial reasons, to remove a navigational or ecological hazard, or because the artifacts or materials are perceived as having monetary or personal value other than scientific or historical. Commercial marine salvage may be restricted to the use of surface supplied diving equipment in some jurisdictions, but work is also done using scuba.
