= Bret Gilliam =

Pioneering technical diver and author (1951–2023)

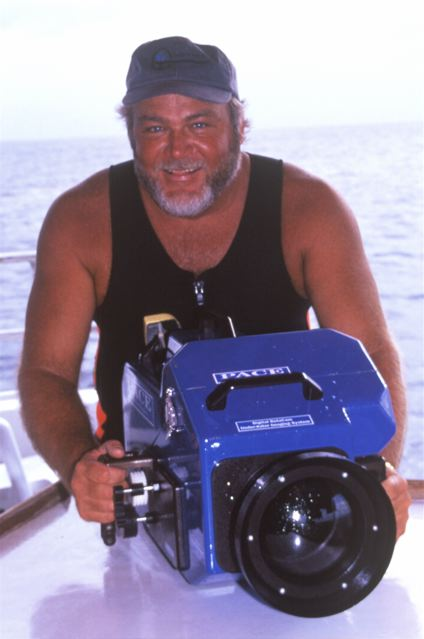
- Gilliam in 1996
- Born: Bret Clifton Gilliam; February 3, 1951; Annapolis, Maryland, U.S.
- Died: October 8, 2023 (aged 72)
- Occupations: Author, businessman, expert witness, explorer

Bret Clifton Gilliam (February 3, 1951 – October 8, 2023) was an American pioneering technical diver. He was most famous as co-founder of the certification agency Technical Diving International along with Mitch Skaggs, and as the one time holder of the world record for deep diving on air. He is also one of diving's most popular writers. Gilliam is the author or coauthor of 72 books, over 1500 feature magazine articles, and over 100 magazine cover photos. In his diving career he has logged over 19,000 dives since 1959.

Gilliam was a multimillionaire from the sale of several businesses that included Technical Diving International (TDI), V. I. Divers Ltd., AMF Yacht Charters, Ocean Quest Cruise Lines, G2 Publishing (Fathoms Magazine), Sea Ventures Ltd., and Uwatec. Several of his companies grew into multi-national conglomerates and two were taken public in major sales while others were sold to private investment groups. The aggregate value of his companies when he sold them was over $80 million.

Gilliam formed the consulting service Ocean Tech in 1971 and provided expert witness testimony for diving and maritime related legal cases. Since 1973, he has appeared in over 400 legal cases nearly exactly evenly divided between defense and plaintiff litigation. (A case in which he appeared as the maritime and diving expert witness for the plaintiffs resulted in a $12 million settlement in May 2015.) Gilliam has also testified in criminal trials and been Congressionally appointed to military court martial proceedings for the U.S. Marine Corps. Special Consultant in various capacities for the U.S. Navy, U.S. Coast Guard (USCG), Naval Criminal Investigative Service (NCIS), Federal Bureau of Investigation (FBI), and the Central Intelligence Agency (CIA).

== Background ==
Bret Gilliam was born at the United States Naval Academy in Annapolis, Maryland, to Commander Gill Gilliam (retired as Captain) and Jeanne Gilliam. He was the first of three children. His younger brother Chris was murdered on February 18, 1971, at the age of 16 while attending an outdoor concert in Puerto Rico.

== Education ==
In 1959, the YMCA developed the first nationally organized course and certified their first skin and scuba diving instructors, and Gilliam began his diving training with Lt. Chuck Brestle while his family was stationed at the Naval Air Station Key West that same year.

From 1965 to 1967 he attended Virginia Beach High School until the school system split students to attend the newly created First Colonial High School. He remained at First Colonial High School until 1967 when his father was transferred to Brunswick Naval Air Station as Senior Executive Officer. He graduated from Brunswick High School in Brunswick, Maine, in 1969. While in high school, he was a stand-out athlete playing football, ice hockey, and baseball while also swimming and running track. He also was sponsored as a surfing competitor for Hobie and Hansen surfboards and participated in contest events on the east and west coasts (and Caribbean) as well as promotional sales activities for those manufacturers from 1965 to 1970.

Gilliam then went on to attend the University of Maine and Bowdoin College where he studied history and political science. He won a National ROTC Scholarship in 1968 and was scheduled to be commissioned as an Army officer when he was recruited to do alternate service on a Navy deep diving project filming nuclear fast attack submarines. Gilliam left his undergraduate studies early to join the Navy project and then went on to pursue a business career by starting Ocean Tech.

== Career ==
Gilliam held several diving jobs and competed as a semi-professional surfer while in high school and college.

In 1971, Gilliam was a diving Supervisor for Vocaline Air Sea Technology (VAST Inc.). The VAST Inc. contract took him to the Caribbean where he worked to develop nitrox and decompression procedures for their dive teams. It was here that Gilliam's interest in underwater photography began. Their work was to record the "visible wake vortex that came off the propeller" of submarines. In 1972 off the island of St. Croix, Gilliam's dive buddy Rod Temple was attacked by oceanic whitetip sharks during a project and was killed. Gilliam was cited for heroism by the Virgin Islands' Governor for his attempt to save Temple when he broke off his decompression and swam back into the attack. Both divers were dragged to depths in excess of 350 feet during the struggle before Temple was torn from Gilliam's grasp. Gilliam survived an out-of-air free ascent from extreme depth and had to be evacuated to Puerto Rico to be treated for decompression sickness. That same year, he also created his consulting company Ocean Tech in the U.S. Virgin Islands.

V.I. Divers Ltd. was founded by Gilliam in 1973 in St. Croix as a dive resort that not only catered to recreational divers but also scientific divers. The company (and others that followed) also had a filming and studio support division that provided location services for boats, diving, equipment, helicopter & aircraft, stunt persons, and local logistics for Hollywood movies, television series, documentaries, and tourism promotions. Film work included movies such as "Pleasure Island", "The Deep", "The Island of Dr. Moreau", "The Man Without A Face", "Dreams of Gold", "Going Overboard", "The Island", "Having A Ball", "Abyss", "The Dive", "Message In A Bottle", "Head Above Water", as well as television productions such as "Miami Vice", "Greatest American Hero", "ABC Sports", "Undersea World of Jacques Cousteau", "HBO", "Showtime", "Discovery Channel", "National Geographic Explorer", "Travel Channel", "Cinemax", "Today", "NBC's live broadcasts of the 1983 America's Cup Races", "Encore Productions", "BBC", and "The Playboy Channel". In 1977, Gilliam served as the founder and president of AMF Yacht Charters Ltd. providing luxury motor yacht charters on vessels up to 380 feet in length. Both companies were sold in 1985 and after a short break, Gilliam resumed his work with the formation of cruise ship lines as the Vice President & CEO Vice President, chief executive officer (CEO) and Director of Ship Operations for Ocean Quest International in 1988. He served as Senior officer aboard their 550-ft., 28,000 ton flagship Ocean Spirit. This was the world's largest sport diving operation in history. Gilliam also began conducting research on dive computer safety during this time and remained with Ocean Quest until the company was sold to Sea Escape Cruise Lines in the fall of 1990.

Gilliam performed a deep air dive on February 14, 1990, at a site named "Mary's Place" in Roatán to 452 feet (138 m). Gilliam later reached 475 feet (145 m) in October 1993 to better his own record.

From 1990 to 1992, Gilliam was the President of SEA VENTURES LTD as well as CEO and Master of the 142-foot (43 m) motor yacht P'zzaz.

In 1993 Gilliam was elected as a Fellow of The Explorers Club, an international organization dedicated to the advancement of field exploration and scientific inquiry which is headquarter in New York city.

=== International Association of Nitrox and Technical Divers ===
In 1991, Gilliam joined Dick Rutkowski, Tom Mount and Billy Deans on the board of directors for International Association of Nitrox and Technical Divers (IANTD). During this time, Gilliam also served as the vice-president of the company. Gilliam co-authored two books over this time period in addition to his work on the training materials used in IANTD courses. He remained in this position with IANTD until 1994 when he joined Mitch Skaggs and Tanya Burnett and formed the training agency Technical Diving International (TDI) as part of the corporation International Training Inc. TDI quickly grew to be the largest technical training agency in the world with offices in 26 countries.

=== International Training Inc ===
International Training Inc. is the parent company for Technical Diving International (TDI), Scuba Diving International (SDI), and Emergency Response Diving International (ERDI), diving certification agencies originally headquartered in Topsham, Maine.

TDI was founded in 1992 by Bret Gilliam, Mitch Skaggs and Tanya Burnett along with several other minority shareholders after a disagreement between IANTD directors caused Gilliam to sell his stock and split away to form the agency.

Gilliam remained President and chief executive officer of International Training Inc until February 5, 2004, when it was sold to investors backing Brian Carney who had been serving as the General Manager. The company is now located in Florida.

=== Uwatec ===
Gilliam took over as president and CEO of UWATEC USA in 1996. Gilliam was instrumental in assisting UWATEC's founder and owner, Heinz Ruchti, with the sale of the company to Johnson Outdoors the following year for nearly $50 million. Gilliam stepped down in November 1998 when Johnson Outdoors merged UWATEC USA with ScubaPro and relocated the company to El Cajon, California. Until 2000, Gilliam remained a consultant to the company.

In 2000, Gilliam served as the president and CEO of a medical program for divers, DiveSafe Insurance Inc. and later sold the company in 2004.

=== Publishing ===
Gilliam served as the publisher or editor of several magazines over the years.

- 1992 to 1995 - Senior Editor of Rodale's Scuba Diving magazine
- 1992 to 1999 - Senior Editor of Scuba Times magazine (including Advanced Diver Journal)
- 1996 to 1999 - Publisher of Deep Tech Journal
- 1999 to 2001 - Senior Editor of Rodale's Scuba Diving magazine
- 2001 to 2005 - President of G2 Publishing Inc., publishers of Fathoms magazine
- 2005 to 2009 - Senior Editor Emeritus for Diving Adventure magazine

Gilliam continued to serve as a contributing editor for diving periodicals such as Diver, Journal of Diving History, Tech Diving Mag, Undercurrent, Asian Diver, ADEX, Asian Geographic, International Society of Aquatic Medicine (ISAM) and Unterwasser (Germany).

Gilliam was the author or contributor to 72 books, over 1500 magazine articles, and over 100 magazine cover photos. He also took part in numerous broadcast television interviews.

== Service activities ==
Gilliam was elected to the Board of Directors by the National Association of Underwater Instructors membership in 1992. During his eight years on the board, he served as the chairman from 1994 to 1995. He also formed the philanthropic Diving Legacy Foundation as vehicle to make donations to various worthy recipients and projects in the diving industry.

Professional Board Positions:

President and Board Chairman: Ocean Tech, 1971– President and Board Chairman: The Diving Legacy Foundation, 2006– Founder, President and CEO: International Training Inc. (TDI, SDI, ERDI) 1994–2004 Founder, President and CEO: DiveSafe Inc. 2000–2004 Founder, President and CEO: G2 Publishing Inc./Fathoms Magazine 2000–2005 Vice President and CEO: UWATEC USA INC. 1996–1999 Founder, President: Tech Publishing Inc. 1996–1999 Member of the Board of Advisors to Rodale's SCUBA DIVING magazine 1992–2001 Chairman of the Board of Directors of the National Association of Underwater Instructors (NAUI) 1994–1995, two-term Board Member 1992–2000; (Vice Chairman 1992–1994, 1996–1997) Member of the Board of Directors of the International Association of Nitrox and Technical Divers (IANTD): Vice President 1991–1994 Member of the Board of Directors of the International Underwater Foundation 1992–1995 Vice President, CEO & Director of Ship Operations: Ocean Quest Int'l 1988–1990 Founder, President and CEO: V. I. Divers Ltd., 1973–1985 Founder, President and CEO: AMF Yacht Charters Ltd., 1977–1985 Founder and chairman, Diving Legacy Foundation, 2005– Board of Advisors, Historical Diving Society (Asia) 2014– Board of Advisors, Asian Geographic Magazine, 2014–

== Death ==
Bret Gilliam died from complications of a stroke on October 8, 2023, at the age of 72.

== Certifications ==
=== Diving instructor and medical credentials ===
- Technical Diving International (TDI#0001)
- Scuba Diving International (SDI#0001)
- Emergency Response Diving International (ERDI#0001)
- National Association of Underwater Instructors (NAUI#3234L)
- Professional Association of Diving Instructors (PADI#5929)
- National Association of Scuba Diving Schools (NASDS#0893)
- Undersea Photographers Instructor Association (UPIA#0102)
- American Nitrox Divers Inc. (ANDI#0031)
- Professional Diving Instructors Corporation (PDIC#5367)
- International Association of Nitrox & Technical Divers (IANTD#0051)
- Technical Deep Air (IANTD#0007), Trimix (IANTD#0008)
- Visual Inspector of Scuba Cylinders (NAUI#V1249)
- Hyperbarics International, Recompression chamber supervisor (#0693)
- Emergency Oxygen Administration/Field Management of Diving Accidents
- Diver Medical Technician Instructor Trainer
- Int'l Board of Underwater Medicine Recompression Chamber Supervisor and medical director for Field Treatment Protocols for hyperbaric injuries

=== Licenses ===
- United States Coast Guard Merchant Marine Officer's License as Master.
- Homeland Security/TWIC security credentials issued as Maritime Officer.
- Additional Licenses: (Unlimited tonnage and Ocean Master licenses from Bahamas, Panama, and Liberia, non-current since retirement)
- TWIC credentials (security clearance ID), Dept. of Homeland Security.
- Single engine aircraft pilot
- Submersible pilot, Perry and Kittredge vessels to 3000 fsw depth

== Awards ==
- Recipient of Outstanding Contribution to Diving award from NAUI, 1979 and 1998
- Recipient of Medal of Excellence from Beneath The Sea Diving Conference six times since 1996
- Election to Who's Who in Scuba Diving by Academy of Marine Sciences & Undersea Research 1993
- Election to Who's Who of the World Diving Community Diving Almanac 2008–2009
- Election to Sterling Divers Hall of Fame 2010
- Publisher of the Year in Diving Media 2002
- Fellow National member of The Explorers Club 1993-current
- International Prize For Diving Journalism 2003
- Diver of the Year Beneath the Sea 2004 "Hall of Fame"
- Medal of Excellence for Honors in Education Beneath The Sea 2005
- SSI Platinum Pro 5000 Diver Honors 1998
- Commendation from NBC Television for 1983 America's Cup Filming
- Legend of the Sea, Beneath the Sea, 2005-2013 (Nine years in a row)
- Publishing Academy Grand Prize For Feature Ocean Journalism 1996
- Two Commendations from U.S. Coast Guard for Lifesaving and Rescue, 1977, 1979
- Recipient of the NOGI Award for Sports/Education in 2012 and inducted into the Academy of Underwater Arts and Sciences (AUAS) Hall of Fame

== Publications ==
- Gilliam, Bret C; Von Maier, Robert; Crea, John (1992). Deep diving: an advanced guide to physiology, procedures and systems. Watersport Publishing, Inc. ISBN 0-922769-30-3.
- Gilliam, Bret C; Mount, Tom (1993). Mixed Gas Diving: The Ultimate Challenge for Technical Diving. Watersport Publishing, Inc. ISBN 0-922769-41-9.
- Gilliam, Bret C.; Neal, Jan (1994). Nitrox, A User Friendly Guide to Enriched Air Mixtures. Technical Diving International.
- Gilliam, Bret C (1995). Scuba Times Magazine's Complete Guide to Caribbean Liveboard Dive Boats. GBP, Inc. ISBN 0-9647628-0-3.
- Gilliam, Bret C (2007). Diving Pioneers and Innovators. New World Publications. ISBN 978-1-878348-42-5.
- Bantin, John; Gilliam, Bret, Amazing Diving Stories 2012, Diver Publishing ISBN 978-1-119-96929-7
- McSwain, N. & Gilliam, Bret Pre-Hospital Trauma Life Support 1994, NAEMT ISBN 0-8151-6333-9
- Gilliam, Bret (contributing editor) The Basic EMT: Comprehensive Pre-Hospital Patient Care, Mosby-Lifeline 1996 ISBN 0-323-01116-0
- Snyderman, Marty; Gilliam, Bret, Great Shark Encounters 1998, Key Porter Books ISBN 1-55013-850-2
- Long, John (editor); Gilliam, Bret (contributing editor), Mark of the Shark 2003, The Globe Pequot Press ISBN 0-7627-1163-9
- Gilliam, Bret (Senior Contributing Editor), There's A Cockroach in My Regulator 2010, Undercurrent Publishing ISBN 978-0-615-33301-4
- Grice, Gordon, "Deadly Kingdom" 2010, The Dial Press, (account of Gilliam shark attack survival pgs. 70–72) ISBN 978-0-385-33562-1
- Fuchs, Ditmar (editor) "Fifty Fathoms: The History of Diving" (Gilliam contributed six chapters and is featured in two others) Blancpain 2014
- Lang, Michael (editor); Gilliam, Bret (contributor) "DAN Nitrox Workshop Proceedings" 2000 Divers Alert Network
- Waterman, Stan (author); Gilliam, Bret (Foreword & contributing photographer) "Sea Salt II: More Salt", Waterman Productions 2015 ISBN 1507871163
- Salama, Asser (author); Gilliam, Bret (Foreword and contributing writer) "Deep Into Deco", Best Publishing Company 2015 ISBN 978-1-930536-79-1
- MacCormack, A. & Green, R. (Editors); Gilliam, Bret (contributing writer) "The Mammoth Book of Shark Attacks" 1996; revised 2013, Constable & Robinson Ltd. ISBN 978-1-47210-029-0
- Jaap, Walter (editor); Gilliam, Bret (contributor) "Diving For Science Proceedings" 1990 American Academy of Underwater Sciences
- Ullrich, Art (editor); Gilliam, Bret (contributor) "Sixth International Conference on Underwater Education Proceedings" 1974 NAUI
- Fead, Lou (editor); Gilliam, Bret (contributor) "Eighth International Conference on Underwater Education Proceedings" 1976 NAUI
- Fead, Lou (editor); Gilliam, Bret (contributor) "Ninth International Conference on Underwater Education Proceedings" 1977 NAUI
- Wells, Frank (editor); Gilliam, Bret (contributor) "1991 International Conference on Underwater Education Proceedings" 1991 NAUI
- Hamilton, R.W. (Editor); Gilliam, Bret (contributor) "Evaluating Enriched Air (Nitrox) Diving Technology" 1992 Scuba Diving Resource Group (SDRG)
- Perry, Martyn (editor); Gilliam, Bret (contributor) "1992 International Conference on Underwater Education Proceedings" 1992 NAUI
- Lang, Michael (editor); Gilliam, Bret (contributor) "Repetitive Diving Workshop Proceedings" 1991 American Academy of Underwater Sciences
- NAUI HQ (editor); Gilliam, Bret (contributor) "1994 International Conference on Underwater Education Proceedings" 1994 NAUI
