= Performance Freediving International =

Freediver training agency

- Abbreviation: PFI
- Formation: 2000
- Purpose: Freediving training
- Headquarters: World Headquarters, Stuart, Florida, United States
- Location: 1321 SE Decker Ave Stuart, FL 34994 USA
- Region served: Worldwide
- CEO/President/Founder: Kirk Krack
- Parent organization: International Training
- Subsidiaries: ERDI; SDI; TDI
- Website: www.tdisdi.com/pfi//

Performance Freediving International (PFI) is a freediving training agency founded in 2000 by Kirk Krack. Krack coached World Champion Freedivers and Mandy-Rae Cruickshank. PFI teaches freediving clinics around the world and is involved in both team and athlete development. Since 2004, PFI has hosted DejaBlue, which is an international freediving competition. In July 2019, PFI was purchased by International Training, the owner of companies including Scuba Diving International and Technical Diving International.

== Promotional work ==
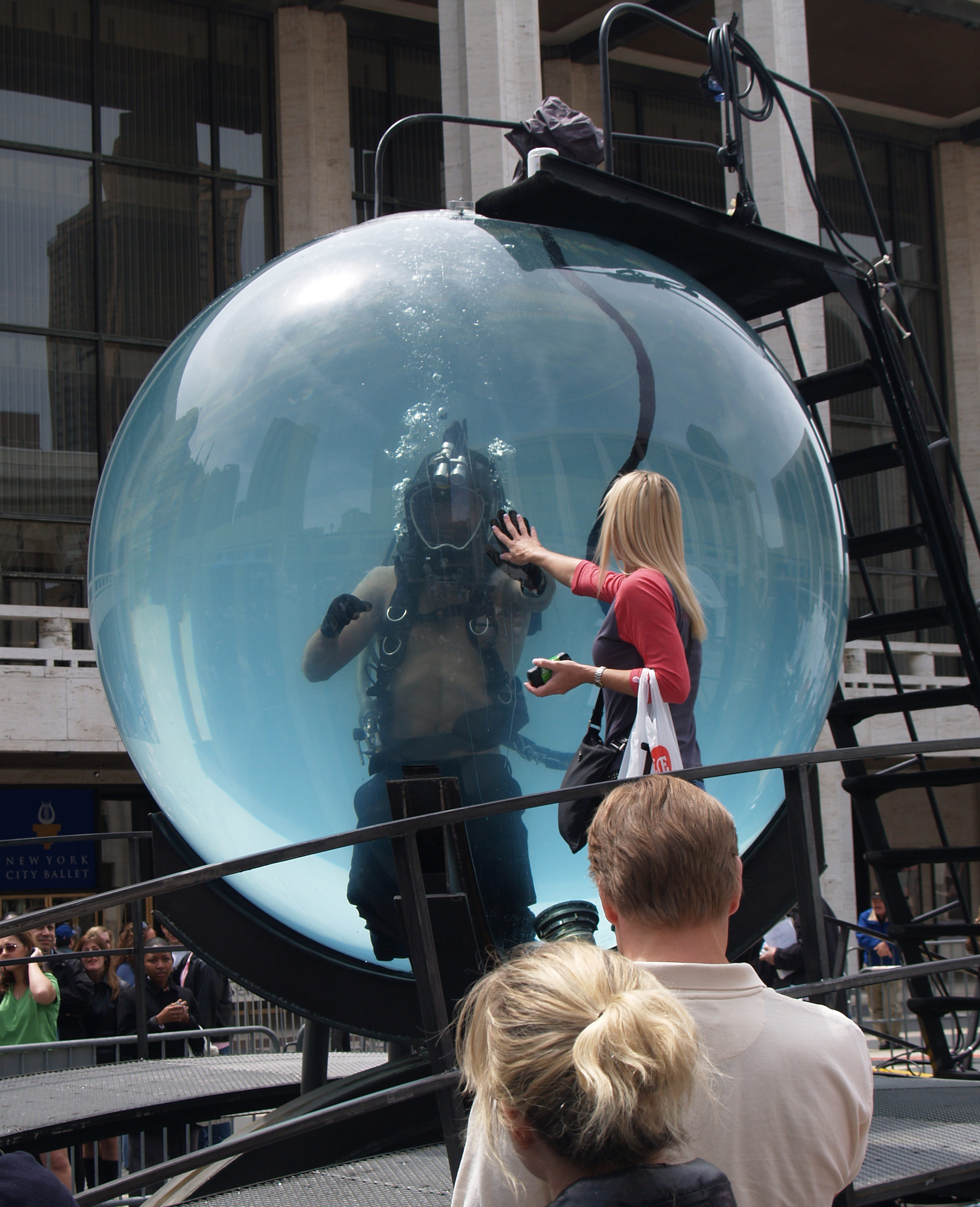
Blaine stunt

In 2008, Cruickshank and Krack trained David Blaine for his appearance on The Oprah Winfrey Show in which he stayed underwater for 17 minutes. PFI Team was responsible for the education and training of David Blaine as well as his safety during the whole event acting as support divers. As David ran into problems with his stunt PFI Team members reacted and pulled him out of the sphere.

In 2017, PFI and TDI began working with James Cameron on the set of Avatar: The Way of Water to train the cast and crew how to both Free Dive and Scuba Dive.

Cruickshank and Krack have also worked with Tiger Woods.

== Training ==
PFI offers the following courses.

=== Diver courses ===
- Snorkeler
- Introduction to Freediving
- Safe Buddy
- Freediver
- Immediate Freediver
- Advanced Freediver
- Safety Freediver

=== Professional courses ===
- Freediver Supervisor
- Assistant Freediver Instructor
- Freediver Instructor
- Assistant Immediate Freediver Instructor
- Immediate Freediver Instructor

== See also ==
- George "Doc" Lopez – Freediver and spearfisherman
