= Bühlmann =

Bühlmann is a surname. Notable people with the surname include:

- Albert A. Bühlmann (1923–1994), Swiss physician at the Laboratory of Hyperbaric Physiology at the University Hospital, Zürich, Switzerland
- Claudia Bühlmann, Swiss bobsledder who competed in the mid-1990s
- Gabriele Bühlmann (born 1964), Swiss rifle shooter who competed at five Olympic Games from 1988 to 2004
- Paul Bühlmann (1927–2000), Swiss actor
- Peter Bühlmann (born 1965), Swiss mathematician and statistician

== See also ==
- Bühlmann decompression algorithm, mathematical model of the way that inert gases enter and leave the body as pressure changes
- Bühlmann model, random effects model used in credibility theory in actuarial science to determine the insurance premiums
