= YMCA SCUBA Program =

Defunct recreational diver training and certification agency

- Successor: Scuba Educators International
- Formation: August 1959
- Dissolved: December 31, 2008
- Type: Program offered by NGO
- Legal status: 501(c)(3) association
- Purpose: Underwater Diver training
- Headquarters: YMCA of the USA; National Head Office
- Location: 101 N Wacker Drive Chicago, IL 60606
- Region served: United States of America and other countries
- Parent organization: YMCA of the USA
- Affiliations: CMAS 1980 - 2008; United States RSTC 1986- 2008
- Staff: 4 (2001)
- Website: http://www.ymca.net/scuba

YMCA SCUBA Program (also known as Y-SCUBA) was an underwater diving training program operated by YMCA of the USA from 1959 to 2008. It was the first nationally organised underwater diving instruction program offered in the United States of America. A program with a similar content is now delivered by Scuba Educators International, an organisation founded by a group of former senior YMCA SCUBA instructors in 2008.

== Origins ==
In 1954, YMCA of the US and other interested parties under the auspices of the Council for National Cooperation in Aquatics commenced a study to look at the safety aspects of underwater diving. Findings of the study were outlined with the view of creating a course of training sufficient to produce 'capable performance in those who elect to participate in… recreational (diving) activity'. A trial course was run during the late 1954 and early 1955 by YMCA of the USA using this outline. The material used in the course was then published in The Science of Skin and SCUBA Diving (or The New Science of Skin and SCUBA Diving as some sources suggest) during 1957. YMCA of the USA then developed its own program of underwater diving instruction for delivery as part of its existing aquatics program. It certified its first snorkelling and scuba diving instructors in August 1959, thereby becoming the first nationally organized underwater diving training program offered in the US.

== Winding up ==
In July 2008, YMCA of the USA announced that the scuba program would cease on December 31, 2008 and that it would continue to replace lost certificate cards for training conducted from 1984 to 2008. In 2008, a group of former YMCA SCUBA instructors created a new organisation called Scuba Educators International (SEI) for the purpose of continuing YMCA SCUBA diver training program under a new banner.

== Recognition ==
In 1980, YMCA SCUBA joined CMAS, thereby gaining access to CMAS International Diver Training Certificates for its divers and instructors. YMCA SCUBA was a member of the Recreational Scuba Training Council (RSTC) from its foundation in 1986 until 2008.

== Qualifications ==
At the time of closure, YMCA SCUBA's qualification system was structured as follows.

=== Snorkel ===
- Snorkeling
- Skin Diver

=== Scuba ===
- Dive Refreshed
- Open Water Diver
- Open Water II Diver
- Advanced Open Water
- Silver Advanced Diver
- Gold Master Diver

=== Leadership ===
- Skin Diving Instructor
- Divemaster
- Assistant Instructor
- Silver Instructor
- Gold Instructor
- Platinum Instructor
- Instructor Trainer

=== Specialities ===
- Aquatic Environmentalist
- Boat Diver
- Cavern Diver
- Computer Assisted Diver
- Dry Suit Diver
- Equipment Service
- Ice Diver
- Night Diver
- Nitrox Diver

=== Specialities continued ===
- Oxygen Provider
- Public Safety Diver
- Reef Ecology
- Research Diver
- Search and Recovery
- SLAM (Scuba Lifesaving & Accident Management) Rescue
- Underwater Archaeology
- Underwater Navigation
- Underwater Photographer
- Wreck Diver

=== CMAS equivalencies ===
The following equivalencies were those in place as of December 2004.

CMAS	Y Scuba
CMAS 1 Star Diver	YMCA Open Water Diver or Advanced Open Water Diver
CMAS 2 Star Diver	YMCA Silver Advanced Diver
CMAS 3 Star Diver	YMCA Divemaster
CMAS 4 Star Diver	YMCA Divemaster and Gold Master diver with 100 logged dives
CMAS 1 Star Instructor	YMCA Assistant Instructor
CMAS 2 Star Instructor	YMCA Silver/Gold/Platinum Instructor
CMAS 3 Star Instructor	YMCA Instructor Trainer
