= Scuba Diving International =

Recreational diver training and certification agency

- Abbreviation: SDI
- Formation: 1998 or 1999
- Type: NGO
- Purpose: Underwater Diver training
- Headquarters: World Headquarters, Stuart, Florida, United States
- Location: 1321 SE Decker Ave Stuart, FL 34994 USA
- Region served: Worldwide
- Parent organization: International Training
- Subsidiaries: ERDI; PFI; TDI
- Affiliations: United States RSTC; RSTC Canada; RSTC Europe
- Website: www.tdisdi.com

Scuba Diving International (SDI) is a Scuba training and certification agency. It is the recreational arm of Technical Diving International, a technical diver training organization.

SDI is a member of the United States RSTC, RSTC Canada and RSTC Europe.

== History ==
SCUBA Diving International, launched in 1998 or 1999, is the sister organization of Technical Diving International. SDI was created by dive professionals from the technical diving field. This gives the organization the perspective of teaching recreational diving through the lens of experienced technical diving.

SDI's philosophy is to improve recreational scuba diving training, enhancing older diving practices by incorporating new diving technology and emphasizing safety. The curriculum is set up to take divers from the beginner level to instructor level and structures its courses around a logged dive and specialty course approach. Divers who progress through SDI's recreational diving courses are then in a position to advance to technical diving with the courses offered by Technical Diving International.

== Training ==
Whereas TDI and ERDI (the two sister companies of SDI) handle technical diving courses and emergency personnel courses respectively, SDI covers the recreational aspect of diving by offering the following courses:

SDI requires students to have access to a modern dive computer on all dives during training from the very start.

SDI is also unusual amongst recreational diver training organisations in that it recognises solo diving as part of recreational diving, and offers a special training course relating to it. Most major recreational diver training organisations mandate diving with a "buddy" at all times.

=== Entry Level Courses ===
These courses are meant for people interested in taking the first steps towards Scuba diving:

- Future Buddies Program - A course designed to provide children between the ages of 8 & 9 an introduction to scuba diving in a controlled environment under the direct supervision of an instructor. Once the future buddy turns 10 they can enroll in the SDI Junior Open Water Diver course.
- Scuba Discovery Program - An introductory program to scuba diving, for people who are not sure they want to proceed with a full scuba course and certification.
- Open Water Scuba Diver Course - Entry-level certification to scuba diving
- Skin Diver Course - A skin diving course.

=== Specialty Courses ===
Advanced Diver Development Program - The aim of this program is for the diver to experience four different specialties to improve comfort level and skills in the water. To qualify as an advanced diver a minimum of 25 logged dives, which may include training dives, is required. These courses are for already certified divers, independent of their skill level, who wish to expand their knowledge of a specific area of interest:

- Advanced Adventure Diver
- Advanced Buoyancy
- Altitude Diver
- Boat Diver
- Computer Diver
- Computer Nitrox Diver
- Deep Diver
- Diver Propulsion Vehicle
- Drift Diver
- Dry Suit Diver
- Equipment Specialist
- Inactive Diver Program
- Full Face Mask Diver Specialty
- Ice Diver
- Marine Ecosystems Awareness
- Night- Limited Visibility Diver
- Research Diver
- Search and Recovery
- Shore/Beach Diver
- Sidemount Diver
- Underwater Hunter & Collector
- Underwater Navigation
- Underwater Photography
- Underwater Video
- Visual Inspection Procedures
- Wreck Diver

=== Advanced courses ===
These courses are for already certified divers, wishing to further progress on their certification level:

- Solo Diver course - One of SDI's most popular courses, the solo diver program teaches experienced recreational divers how to safely dive independently of a dive buddy or strengthen your buddy team skills. This course so far is not offered by any other Underwater diving training organization.
- Rescue Diver course - This course is designed for certified Advanced Divers to develop their knowledge and necessary skills to perform self rescues, buddy rescues and to assist and administer necessary first aid. (This is not a course for professional rescue divers. Such courses are offered by ERDI. A sister company of TDI and SDI)
- Master Scuba Diver development program - This certification is awarded to certified Rescue Divers that have logged 50 dives.

=== Professional Courses ===
The courses below are considered professional courses as they allow the diver to engage in appropriate paid work:

- Divemaster Course
- Assistant Instructor Course
- Instructor Course
- Specialty Instructor
- Course Director Qualifications
- Instructor Trainer Qualifications
- Online Instructor Crossover System - A program for Instructors who are current with another recognized scuba certification agency to crossover to Scuba Diving International.

=== EUF Certification ===
The SDI and the TDI training systems obtained CEN certification from the EUF certification body in 2006 with certificate number S EUF CB 2006002, and is currently certified until 2022.

== Corporate affiliates ==
Scuba Diving International is one of the subsidiaries of International Training whose group includes Emergency Response Diving International, First Response Training International, Performance Freediving International and Technical Diving International.
