= Emergency Response Diving International =

American organisation for training and certification of emergency response divers

- Abbreviation: ERDI
- Formation: 2000,
- Purpose: Public Safety Diver training
- Headquarters: World Headquarters, Stuart, Florida, United States
- Location: 1321 SE Decker Ave Stuart, FL 34994 USA
- Region served: Worldwide
- Parent organization: International Training
- Affiliations: PFI; SDI; TDI
- Website: http://www.tdisdi.com

Emergency Response Diving International claims to be the largest organization devoted to training emergency response divers in public safety diving (PSD). It was founded in Orlando, Florida in 2000 by Scuba Diving International in response to a high accident rate in the training of emergency response divers. The earliest lessons held by it were attended by almost 24 police officers, firefighters, and volunteers from the United States. Mitch Skaggs was one of the instructors at the founding of the organization.

The organization trains public safety officials, including firefighters and policemen for underwater/submerged environments. Its sister organization Technical Diving International, is the world's largest training agency for technical diving.

All ERDI programs are NFPA and OSHA compliant. All materials are written and reviewed by PSD professionals.

== Levels of Training and Certification ==
Awareness - The Awareness level can be completed by doing the online academics, or participating in the associated classroom-based section of education for the ERDI course of interest. Upon completion of any of the online or classroom ERDI Academy courses, an individual will receive an awareness level certificate. For additional insight and understanding of the course, the individual can audit the practical session.

Operations - The Operations level of certification requires the participant to complete the online or classroom academics and also participate in the non-diving practical segments of the course taught by an ERDI Instructor. Depending on the program an individual is completing, this portion of the training shows how to properly perform and/or supervise non-diving emergency response duties.

Technician - The Technician level is the final step and requires the participant to complete the required number of practical training sessions under the supervision of an ERDI Instructor. Here, the individual will apply what he or she has learned during the awareness and skill-development sessions, while learning practical lessons that can only be gained by performing all practical activities associated with the program.

== Licensing ==
ERDI is the only public safety dive training agency licensed by the Florida Department of Education to teach the following programs:

- Assistant Instructor (AI)
- Divemaster (DM)
- Emergency Response Diving Instructor
- ERD Contaminated Water OPS Instructor
- Instructor Development Course (IDC) / Instructor Examination Course (IEC)
- Instructor Trainer (IT)
