= Technical Diving International =

Technical diver training and certification agency

- Abbreviation: TDI
- Formation: 1993
- Type: NGO
- Purpose: Scuba Diver & Instructor training and certification
- Headquarters: World Headquarters, Stuart, Florida, United States
- Location: 1321 SE Decker Ave Stuart, FL 34994 USA
- Region served: Worldwide
- Key people: Brian Carney; Sean Harrison; Bret Gilliam; David Sipperly; Mitch Skaggs
- Parent organization: International Training
- Affiliations: ERDI; PFI; SDI
- Website: http://www.tdisdi.com

Technical Diving International (TDI) claims to be the largest technical diving certification agency in the world, and one of the first agencies to offer mixed gas and rebreather training. TDI specializes in more advanced Scuba diving techniques, particularly diving with rebreathers and use of breathing gases such as trimix and heliox.

TDI provides courses and certification for divers and for instructors.

== TDI history ==
TDI was founded in 1992 by Mitch Skaggs, Bret Gilliam and David Sipperly after a split away from International Association of Nitrox and Technical Divers (IANTD) in 1993. The agency aimed to provide training materials and education for specialized diving situations. Some courses offered by TDI include open circuit courses such as diving with Nitrox as well as Rebreather courses. They also provide training for overhead environments like caves and wrecks, mixed gas training and were one of the first diving agencies to create a comprehensive insurance plan for technical diving instructors.

In 1998, the International Training brand expanded their offerings by starting a sister organization known as Scuba Diving International (SDI) focusing on the sport side of scuba diving. In 2000, another sister organization was launched called Emergency Response Diving International (ERDI) to teach public safety diving to public safety organizations.

One of TDI's main goals since its inception is to be an innovator in the technical diving market, providing the latest programs & techniques and altering the previously held perception that technical diving was too risky. By 1993 a few technical diving organizations had begun to form to prepare professional divers for technical diving situations and TDI joined the market. TDI created a training mission to shed new light on traditional diving limits while offering courses that meet the standards set by the World Recreational Scuba Training Council.

In February 2004 Bret Gilliam sold the conglomerate company, International Training, Inc. to an investment group led by Brian Carney.

== Courses & Training ==
Technical Diving Student Courses/Technical Diving Professional Courses

These courses are offered by TDI for both student and professional certification.

Open Circuit Courses: In open circuit scuba diving, air and mixed gas are used as the gas supply, however air is the primary gas supply. With open circuit systems, a compressed gas supply is attached to a demand regulator, which is the device from which the diver breathes. Divers who plan to use open circuit systems must be properly trained in this equipment. Open circuit courses include Intro to Tech Diving, Nitrox diving and other topics. See below for a full list of Open Circuit Courses offered by TDI.

- Intro to Tech Diving
- Nitrox Diver
- Advanced Nitrox Diver
- Decompression Procedures Diver
- Helitrox Diver
- Extended Range Diver
- Trimix Diver
- Advanced Trimix Diver
- Sidemount Diver
- Overhead Environment Courses
- Service Courses

Overhead Environment Courses: Overhead Environment diving refers to diving situations in which there is not open water above the diver and the diver can't make a direct ascent to the surface. Thus, Overhead Environment divers must take extra preparations and precautions, as they will not be able to escape upward in the case of an emergency. Overhead Environment Diving includes wreck diving and cave diving, which are highly sought after by many divers. See below for a full list of Open Circuit Courses offered by TDI.

- Cavern Diver
- Intro to Cave Diver
- Full Cave Diver
- Advanced Wreck Diver
- Cave DPV Diver
- Stage Cave Diver
- Cave Surveying Diver

Rebreather Courses: A rebreather is a breathing apparatus consisting of a breathing loop, a mouthpiece, a CO_{2} absorbent canister, and a counterlung. There are three types of rebreathers: Oxygen rebreathers, semi-closed rebreathers and closed circuit rebreathers. While rebreathers allow for a greater efficiency of gas use, optimized decompression characteristics and quieter operation, divers must be properly trained in this equipment before their use. TDI offers the courses below to help divers who wish to start using rebreathers.

- Semi-Closed Rebreather Diver (Dolphin, Ray, Submatix ST100, Azmuth, GEM)
- Air Diluent Closed Circuit Rebreather Diver (Copis, Evolution, Inspiration, KISS, Megalodon, Optima, Ouroborus, Pathfinder, Pelegian, Prism II, rEvo, Sentinel, Submatix CCR100, Titan)
- Basic Air Diluent Decompression Rebreather Diver (Copis, Evolution, Inspiration, KISS, Megalodon, Optima, Ouroborus, Pathfinder, Pelegian, Prism II, rEvo, Sentinel, Submatix CCR100, Titan)
- Air Diluent Closed Circuit Rebreather Diver, Unit Specific- Discovery Poseidon MKVI
- Mixed Gas Closed Circuit Rebreather Diver (Copis, Evolution, Inspiration, KISS, Megalodon, Optima, Ouroborus, Pathfinder, Pelegian, Prism II, rEvo, Sentinel, Submatix CCR100, Titan)
- Advanced Mix Gas Closed Circuit Rebreather Diver (Evolution, Inspiration, KISS, Megalodon, Optima, Ouroborus, Pelegian, Prism II, rEvo, Sentinel, Submatix CCR100, Titan)

Service Courses: When it comes to diving, air is not necessarily the best gas to breathe. For this reason, technical divers experiment with blending alternative gases to create a better diving gas. Gas blending is a technique that must be carefully learned, which is why TDI offers service courses to learn how to blend these gases. Students learn the formulas to determine how much of each gas is needed as well as proper techniques for preparing equipment.

- Nitrox Gas Blender
- Advanced Gas Blender
- O_{2} Service Technician

Technical Diving Instructor Trainer Courses TDI offers an instructor trainer workshop which is a 7-day program to achieve the greatest level of certification offered by the agency.

Technical Divemaster Course The Technical Divemaster Course is the first step to achieving Leadership certification. Divemasters learn the physics involved in diving, as well as how to lead groups of divers on safe, enjoyable dives. Divemasters assist Technical Diving Instructors, the highest level of leadership certification.

=== EUF Certification ===
The TDI and the SDI training systems obtained CEN certification from the EUF certification body in 2006.

== Affiliations ==
Technical Diving International is the sister company of SCUBA Diving International, which focuses on the sport side of recreational diving, as well as Emergency Response Diving International, the company's public safety diving branch.
