= Aware (disambiguation) =

Awareness (adjectival form Aware) is the perception of or reaction to an event.

Aware may also refer to:

- Aware, Inc., a biometrics software and services company
- Aware Electronics, a USA designer and manufacturer of Geiger counters and radiation monitors
- Aware Records, a record label owned by Columbia Records
- Aware (Beanie Baby), a Beanie Baby bear marketed to raise funds for breast cancer
- Aware (album), an album by Salvador
- Aware (voluntary organisation)
- Aware (woreda), a district in Ethiopia
  - Aware, Ethiopia, a town in that district
- The Aware, a 2003 novel by Glenda Larke
- Aware, also called mono no aware, a concept in Japanese aesthetics
- Aware Magazine, a quarterly publication of Garrett-Evangelical Theological Seminary
- AWARE: Glimpses of Consciousness, a 2021 documentary film about consciousness

AWARE may be the acronym for:

- Project AWARE, a scuba diving charitable foundation
- Association of Women for Action and Research, an NGO in Singapore
- The AWARE Study (AWAreness during REsuscitation)
- The AWaRe classification for antibiotics by the World Health Organization

Awareness may also refer to:

- Awareness (album), a 1971 album by Buddy Terry
- Awareness (film), a 2023 film
- Brand awareness, a marketing term
- Awareness Records, a record label founded by Andy Ware
- Awareness: The Perils and Opportunities of Reality, a book by Anthony de Mello
- Anesthesia awareness
- Context awareness on context with operational context
- Legal awareness
- Location awareness on context with physical location
- Raising awareness
