= Decompression equipment =

Equipment used by divers to facilitate decompression

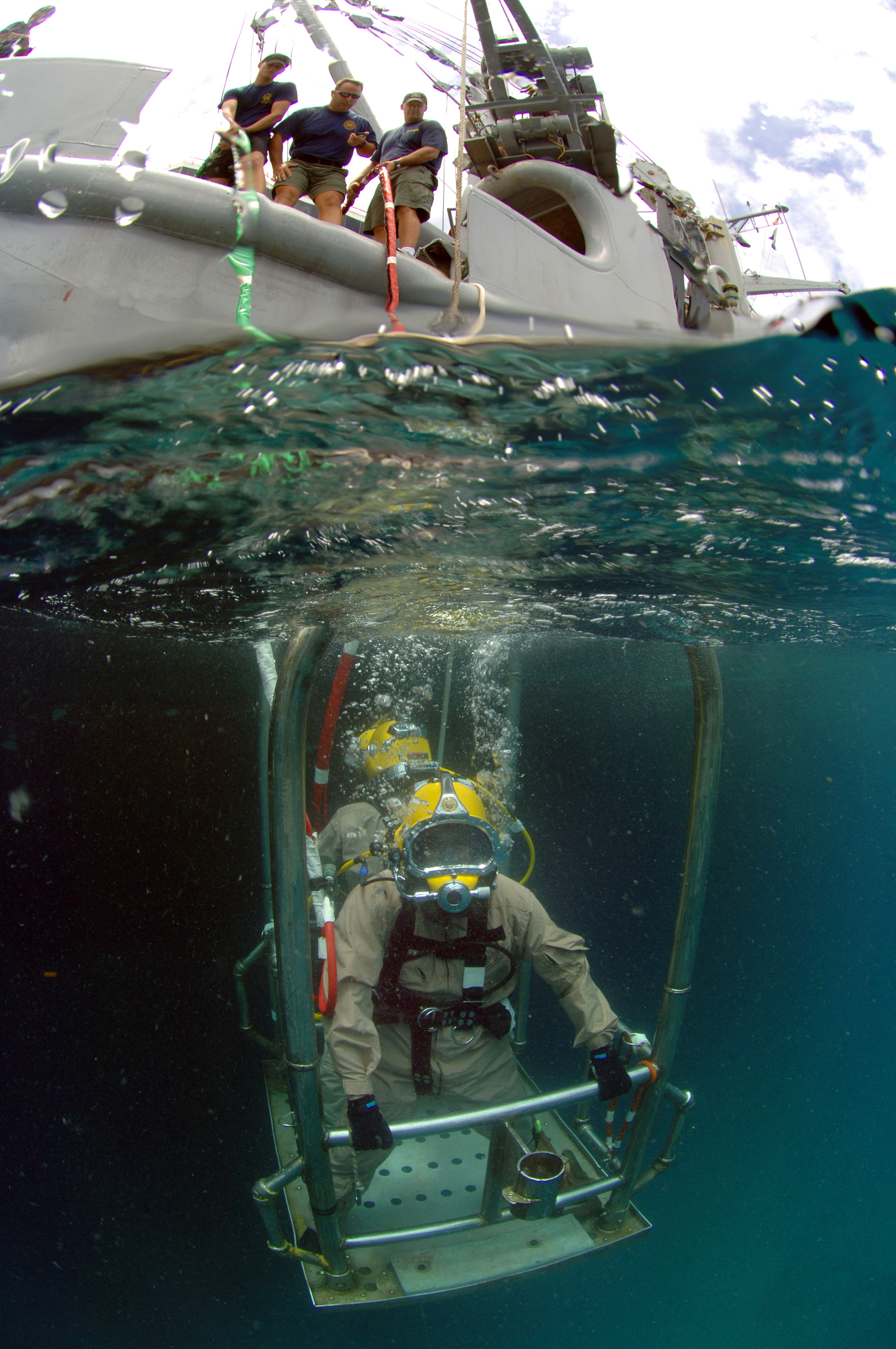
- Surface supplied diver on diving stage
- Uses: Equipment used by divers to facilitate decompression
- Related items: Dive computer, Decompression practice, Diving bell, Diving chamber

There are several categories of decompression equipment used to help divers decompress, which is the process required to allow ambient pressure divers to return to the surface safely after spending time underwater at higher ambient pressures.

Decompression obligation for a given dive profile must be calculated and monitored to ensure that the risk of decompression sickness is controlled. Some equipment is specifically for these functions, both during planning before the dive and during the dive. Other equipment is used to mark the underwater position of the diver, as a position reference in low visibility or currents, or to assist the diver's ascent and control the depth.

Decompression may be shortened ("accelerated") by breathing an oxygen-rich "decompression gas" such as a nitrox blend or pure oxygen. The high partial pressure of oxygen in such decompression mixes produces the effect known as the oxygen window. This decompression gas is often carried by scuba divers in side-slung cylinders. Cave divers who can only return by a single route, can leave decompression gas cylinders attached to the guideline ("stage" or "drop cylinders") at the points where they will be used. Surface-supplied divers will have the composition of the breathing gas controlled at the gas panel.

Divers with long decompression obligations may be decompressed inside gas filled hyperbaric chambers in the water or at the surface, and in the extreme case, saturation divers are only decompressed at the end of a project, contract, or tour of duty that may be several weeks long.

== Planning and monitoring decompression ==
Equipment for planning and monitoring decompression includes decompression tables, depth gauges, timers, surface computer software, and personal decompression computers. There is a wide range of choice.

=== Decompression algorithms ===
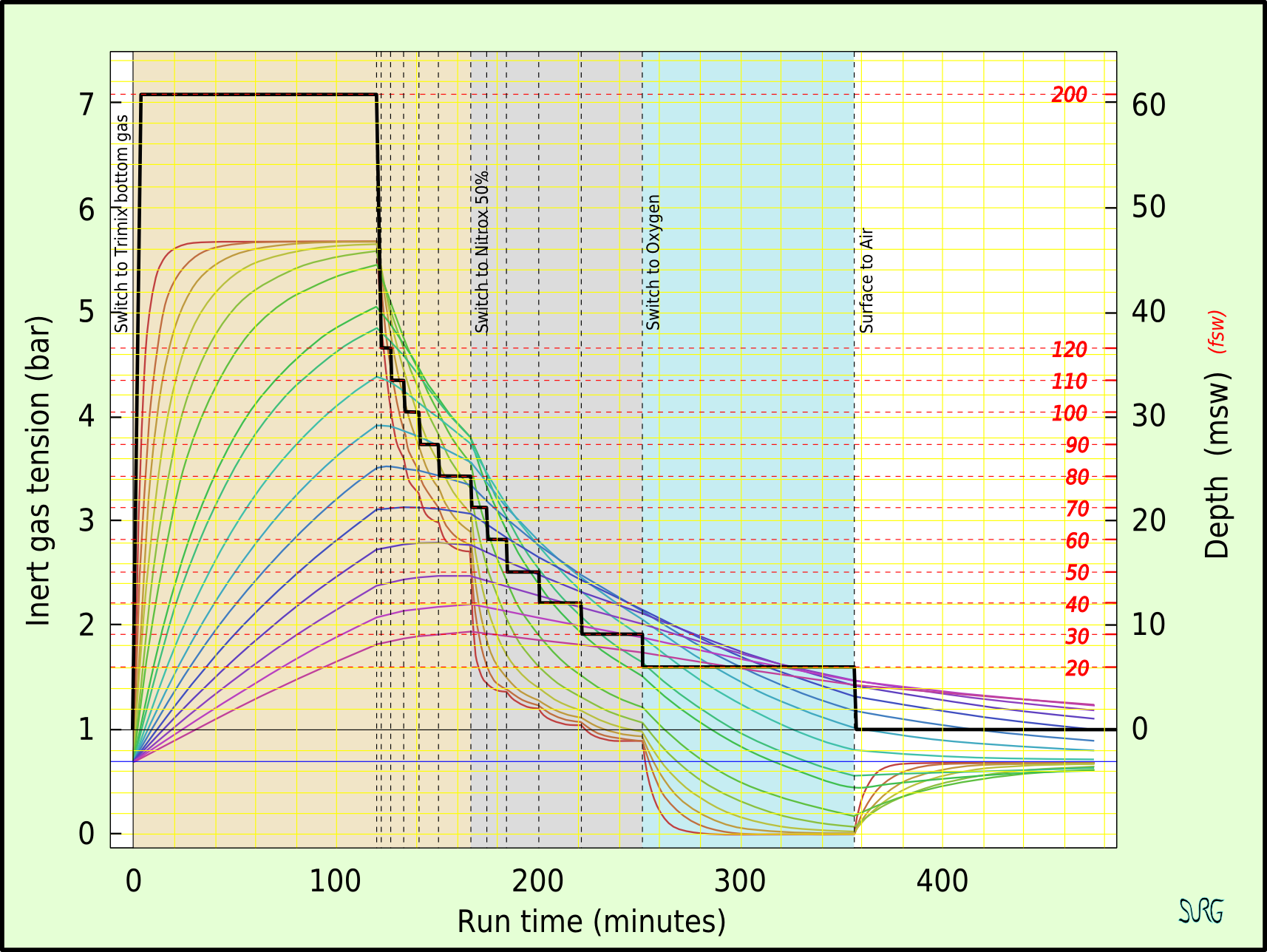
Inert gas tension in the tissue compartments during a decompression dive with gas switching to accelerate decompression, as predicted by a decompression algorithm

A decompression algorithm is used to calculate the decompression stops needed for a particular dive profile to reduce the risk of decompression sickness occurring after surfacing at the end of a dive. The algorithm can be used to generate decompression schedules for a particular dive profile, decompression tables for more general use, or be implemented in dive computer software.

==== Choice of tables or algorithms ====
During the 1980s the US recreational diving community tended to move away from the US Navy tables to a range of tables published by other organisations, including several of the diver certification agencies (BSAC, NAUI, PADI).

Depending on the table or computer chosen the range of no-decompression limits at a given depth on air can vary considerably, for example for 100 fsw (30 msw) the no stop limit varies from 25 to 8 minutes. It is not possible to discriminate between "right" and "wrong" options, but it is considered correct to say that the risk of developing DCS is greater for the longer exposures and less for the shorter exposures.

The choice of tables for professional diving use is generally made by the organisation employing the divers. For recreational training it is usually prescribed by the certifying agency, but for recreational purposes the diver is generally free to make use of any of the published tables, and for that matter, to modify them to suit himself or herself.

=== Decompression tables ===
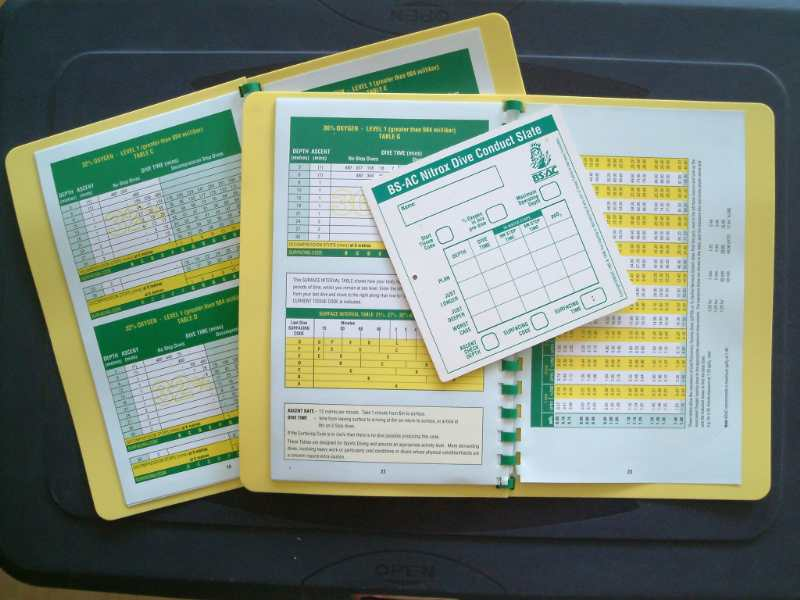
BSAC nitrox decompression tables

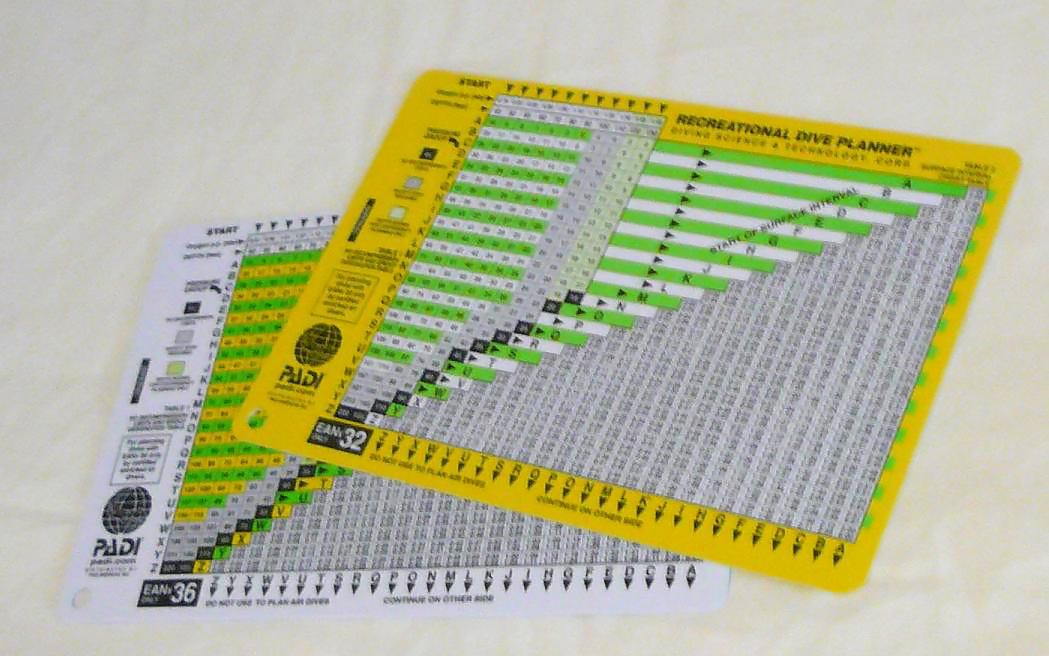
The PADI Nitrox tables are laid out in what has become a common format for no-stop recreational tables.

Dive tables or decompression tables are tabulated data, often in the form of printed cards or booklets, that allow people to determine a decompression schedule for a given dive or other hyperbaric exposure profile and breathing gas.

Decompression tables represent procedures recommended for decompression from hyperbaric exposures to a continuum of possibilities by schedules tabulated for discrete cases of such exposures chosen for practicality and convenience of the user. They may represent data from theoretical decompression models or empirical data from series of tests on animal and human subjects, or combinations thereof, and may be empirically adjusted to reduce risk or improve efficiency. The availability of dive computers which can apply algorithms in real time to calculate the personal decompression status of a diver have to a large extent supplanted decompression tables for recreational and scientific divers, but tables remain a practical and convenient method for deciding decompression schedules for people exposed to similar but not necessarily identical pressure profiles, particularly when they are to be decompressed as a group, such as saturation divers and compressed air workers.

With decompression tables, it is generally assumed that the hyperbaric exposure, or dive profile, is a square profile, meaning that the diver descends to maximum depth immediately and stays at the same depth until resurfacing (approximating a rectangular outline when drawn in a coordinate system where one axis is depth and the other is duration). Some dive tables also assume physical condition or acceptance of a specific level of risk from the diver. Some recreational tables only provide for no-stop dives at sea level sites, but the more complete tables can take into account staged decompression dives and dives performed at altitude.

==== Commonly used decompression tables ====
- US Navy decompression tables
- Bühlmann tables
- Royal Navy (RNPL) tables
- BSAC 88 tables
- PADI tables: the Recreational Dive Planner (RDP) and "the wheel"
- DCIEM tables
- French Navy MN90 tables
- French commercial diving tables MT74 and MT92
- NAUI dive tables
- NORSOK standard U-100 Table 12 Saturation decompression schedule
- Blackpool decompression table for compressed air work
- NOAA Nitrox tables

==== Other published tables ====
- Jeppesen
- Huggins
- German (Bühlmann/Hahn)
- Pandora tables
- 1% Risk

==== Recreational Dive Planner ====
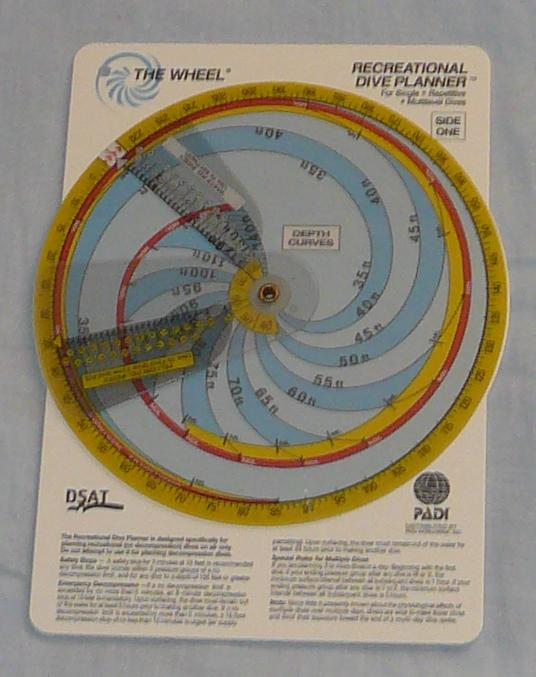
The PADI recreational dive planner, in "Wheel" format

The Recreational Dive Planner (or RDP) is a set of devices marketed by PADI with which no-stop time underwater can be calculated. The RDP was developed by DSAT and was the first dive table developed exclusively for recreational, no stop diving. There are four types of RDPs: the original table version first introduced in 1988, The Wheel version, the original electronic version or eRDP introduced in 2005 and the latest electronic multi-level version or eRDPML introduced in 2008.

The low price and convenience of many modern dive computers mean that many recreational divers only use tables such as the RDP for a short time during training before moving on to use a diving computer.

=== Decompression software ===
Decompression software such as Departure, DecoPlanner, DiveLogic, Ultimate Planner, Z-Planner, V-Planner and GAP are available, which simulate the decompression requirements of different dive profiles with different gas mixtures using decompression algorithms.

Decompression software can be used to generate tables or schedules matched to a diver's planned dive profile and breathing gas mixtures. The usual procedure is to generate schedules for the intended profile and for the most likely contingency profiles, such as slightly greater depth, delayed ascent and early ascent. Sometimes an emergency minimum decompression schedule and a more conservative schedule will be generated to allow the diver further options.

Decompression software is available based on:

- US Navy models – both the dissolved phase and mixed phase models
- Bühlmann algorithm, e.g. Z-planner
- Reduced Gradient Bubble Model (RGBM), e.g. GAP
- Varying Permeability Model (VPM), e.g. V-Planner
- Thalmann algorithm e.g. DiveLogic

and variations of these.

V-Planner runs the variable permeability model, developed by D.E. Yount and others in 2000, and allows the choice of VPM-B and VPM-B/E, with six conservatism levels (baseline plus five incrementally more conservative ones). GAP allows the user to choose between a multitude of Bühlmann-based algorithms and the full reduced gradient bubble model, developed by Bruce Wienke in 2001, in its five conservatism levels (baseline, two incrementally more liberal and two incrementally more conservative).

=== Personal decompression computers ===
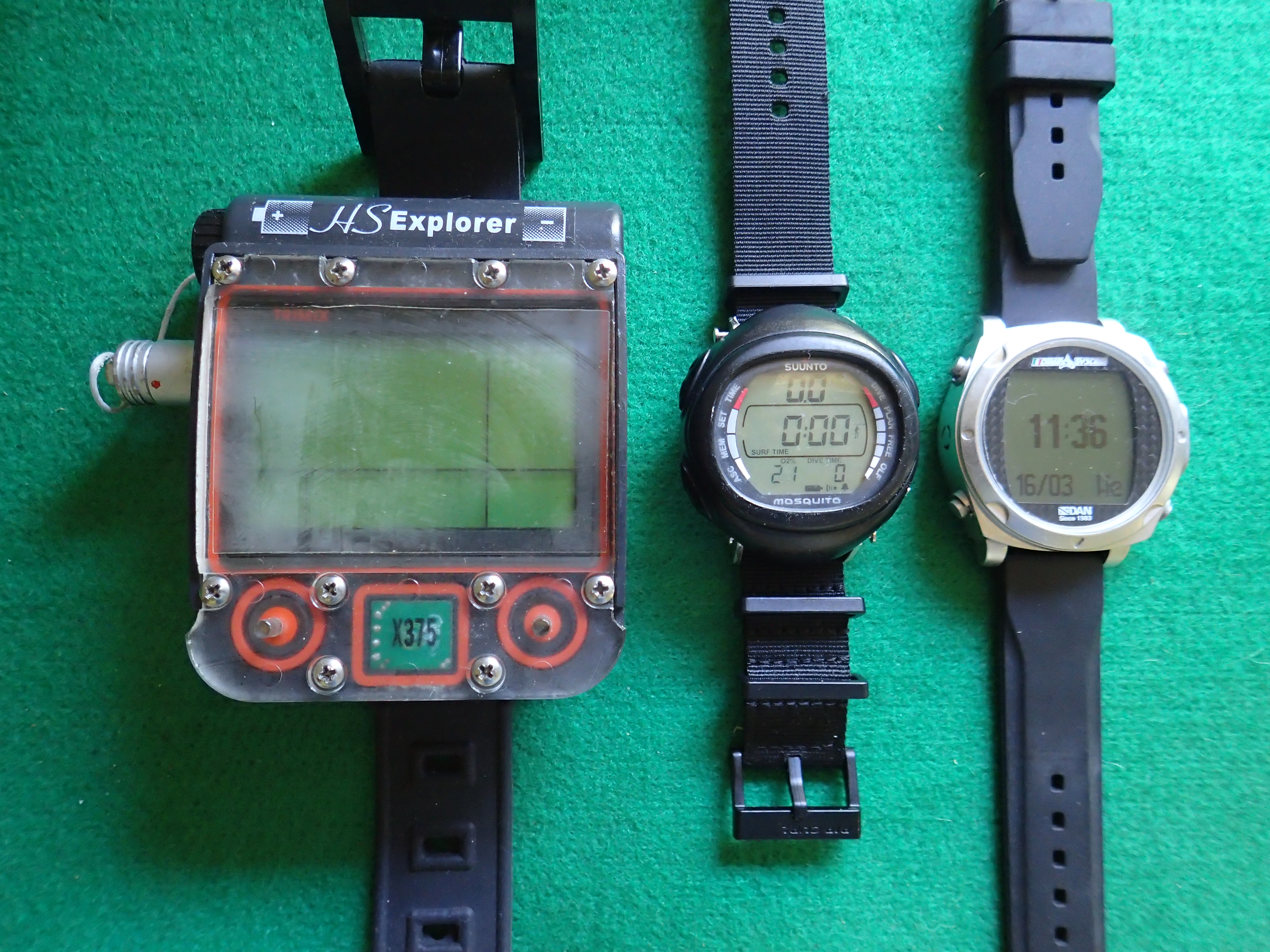
HSE Explorer Trimix and rebreather dive computer. Suunto Mosquito with aftermarket strap and iDive DAN recreational dive computers

The personal decompression computer, or dive computer, is a small computer designed to be worn by a diver during a dive, with a pressure sensor and an electronic timer mounted in a waterproof and pressure resistant housing and which has been programmed to model the inert gas loading of the diver's tissues in real time during a dive. Most are wrist mounted, but a few are mounted in a console with the submersible pressure gauge and possibly other instruments. A display allows the diver to see critical data during the dive, including the maximum and current depth, duration of the dive, and decompression data including the remaining no decompression limit calculated in real time for the diver throughout the dive. Other data such as water temperature and cylinder pressure are also sometimes displayed. The dive computer has the advantages of monitoring the actual dive, as opposed to the planned dive, and does not assume on a "square profile" – it dynamically calculates the real profile of pressure exposure in real time, and keeps track of residual gas loading for each tissue used in the algorithm. Dive computers also provide a measure of safety for divers who accidentally dive a different profile to that originally planned. If the diver exceeds a no-decompression limit, decompression additional to the ascent rate will be necessary. Most dive computers will provide the necessary decompression information for acceptably safe ascent in the event that the no-decompression limits are exceeded.

The use of computers to manage recreational dive decompression is becoming the standard and their use is also common in occupational scientific diving. Their value in surface supplied commercial diving is more restricted, but they can usefully serve as a dive profile recorder.

==== Decompression using a personal decompression computer ====
The personal decompression computer provides a real time modelling of the inert gas load on the diver according to the decompression algorithm programmed into the computer by the manufacturer, with possible personal adjustments for conservatism and altitude set by the user. In all cases the computer monitors the depth and elapsed time of the dive, and many allow user input specifying the gas mixture.

Most computers require the diver to specify the mixture before the dive, but some allow the choice of mixture to be changed during the dive, which allows for the use of gas switching for accelerated decompression. A third category, mostly used by closed circuit rebreather divers, monitors the partial pressure of oxygen in the breathing mix using a remote oxygen sensor, but requires diver intervention to specify the inert gas constituents and ratio of the mix in use.

The computer retains the diver's pressure exposure history, and continuously updates the calculated tissue loads on the surface, so the current tissue loading should always be correct according to the algorithm, though it is possible to provide the computer with misleading input conditions, which can nullify its reliability.

This ability to provide real-time tissue loading data allows the computer to indicate the diver's current decompression obligation, and to update it for any permissible profile change, so the diver with a decompression ceiling does not have to decompress at any specific depth provided the ceiling is not violated, though the decompression rate will be affected by the depth. As a result, the diver can make a slower ascent than would be called for by a decompression schedule computed by the identical algorithm, as may suit the circumstances, and will be credited for gas elimination during the slower ascent, and penalised if necessary for additional ingassing for those tissues affected. This provides the diver with an unprecedented flexibility of dive profile while remaining within the safety envelope of the algorithm in use.

=== Ratio decompression ===
Ratio decompression (usually referred to in abbreviated form as ratio deco) is a technique for calculating decompression schedules for scuba divers engaged in deep diving without using dive tables, decompression software or a dive computer. It is generally taught as part of the "DIR" philosophy of diving promoted by organisations such Global Underwater Explorers (GUE) and Unified Team Diving (UTD) at the advanced technical diving level. It is designed for decompression diving executed deeper than standard recreational diving depth limits using trimix as a "bottom mix" breathing gas.

It is largely an empirical procedure, and has a reasonable safety record within the scope of its intended application. Advantages are reduced overall decompression time and for some versions, easy estimation of decompression by the use of a simple rule-based procedure which can be done underwater by the diver. It requires the use of specific gas mixtures for given depth ranges. The advantages claimed are flexibility in that if the depth is not known accurately, the schedule can be adjusted during the dive to allow for the actual depth, and that it allows deep dives without the use of an expensive trimix dive computer.

Limitations include that a consistent set of gases must be used which match the specific ratio model, and the specific ratio will only be relevant to a limited range of depths. As the parameters move away from the base conditions, conservatism will diverge, and the probability of symptomatic bubble formation will become more unpredictable. There is also the requirement for the diver to do mental arithmetic at depth to calculate the parameters of a safety-critical operation. This may be complicated by adverse circumstances or an emergency situation.

== Controlling depth and ascent rate ==
A critical aspect of successful decompression is that the depth and ascent rate of the diver must be monitored and sufficiently accurately controlled. Practical in-water decompression requires a reasonable tolerance for variation in depth and rate of ascent, but unless the decompression is being monitored in real time by a decompression computer, any deviations from the nominal profile will affect the risk. Several items of equipment are used to assist in facilitating accurate adherence to the planned profile, by allowing the diver to more easily control depth and ascent rate, or to transfer this control to specialist personnel at the surface.

=== Shot lines ===
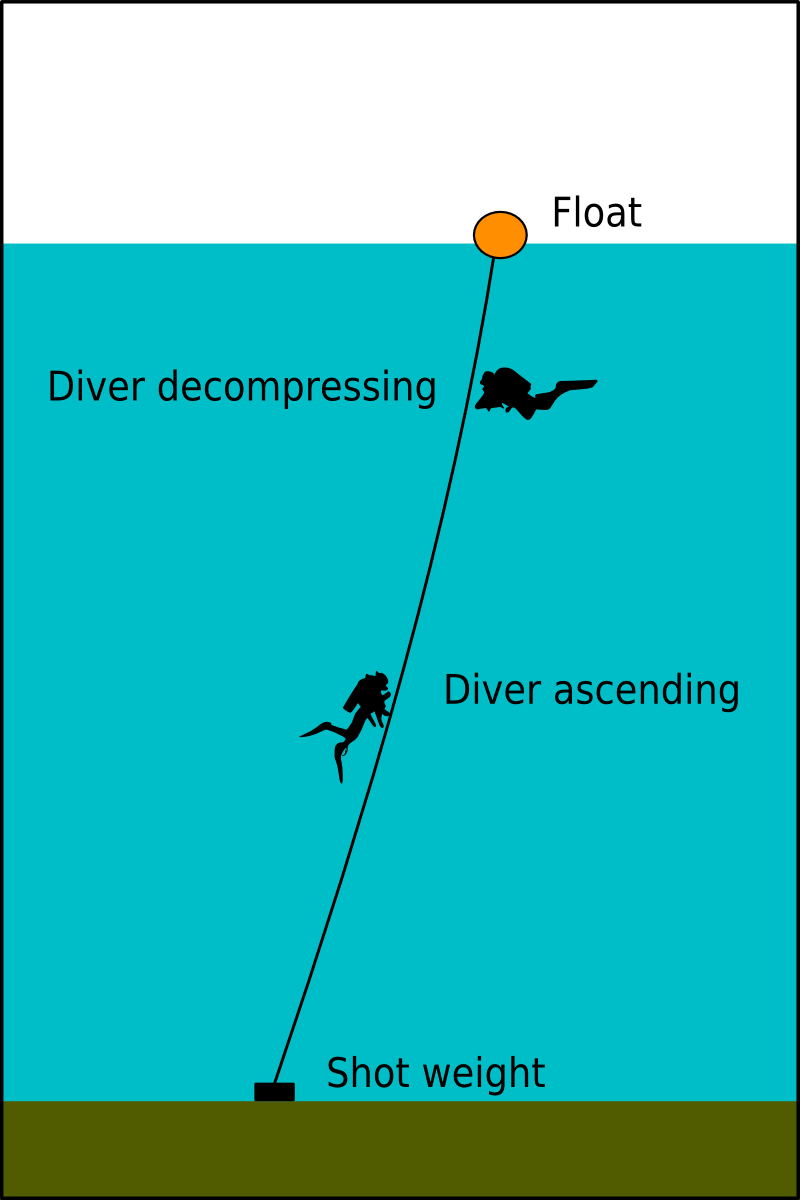
Divers ascending and decompressing using a shotline

A shot line is a rope between a float at the surface, and a sufficiently heavy weight holding the rope approximately vertical. The shot line float should be sufficiently buoyant to support the weight of all divers that are likely to be using it at the same time. As divers are seldom weighted to be very negatively buoyant, a positive buoyancy of 50 kg is considered adequate by some authorities for general commercial use. Recreational divers are free to choose lesser buoyancy at their own risk. The shot weight should be sufficient to prevent a diver from lifting it from the bottom by over-inflation of the buoyancy compensator or dry suit, but not sufficient to sink the float if the slack on the line is all taken up. Various configurations of shot line are used to control the amount of slack.

The diver ascends along the shotline, and may use it purely as a visual reference, or can hold on to it to positively control depth, or can climb up it hand over hand. A Jonline may be used to fasten a diver to an anchor line or shot line during a decompression stop.

Shot line configurations:

- Basic shot line
- Self tensioning arrangements
  - Running weight or top tensioned shotline
  - Running float or bottom tensioned shotline
- Lazy shot line or lazy shot

==== Jonlines ====
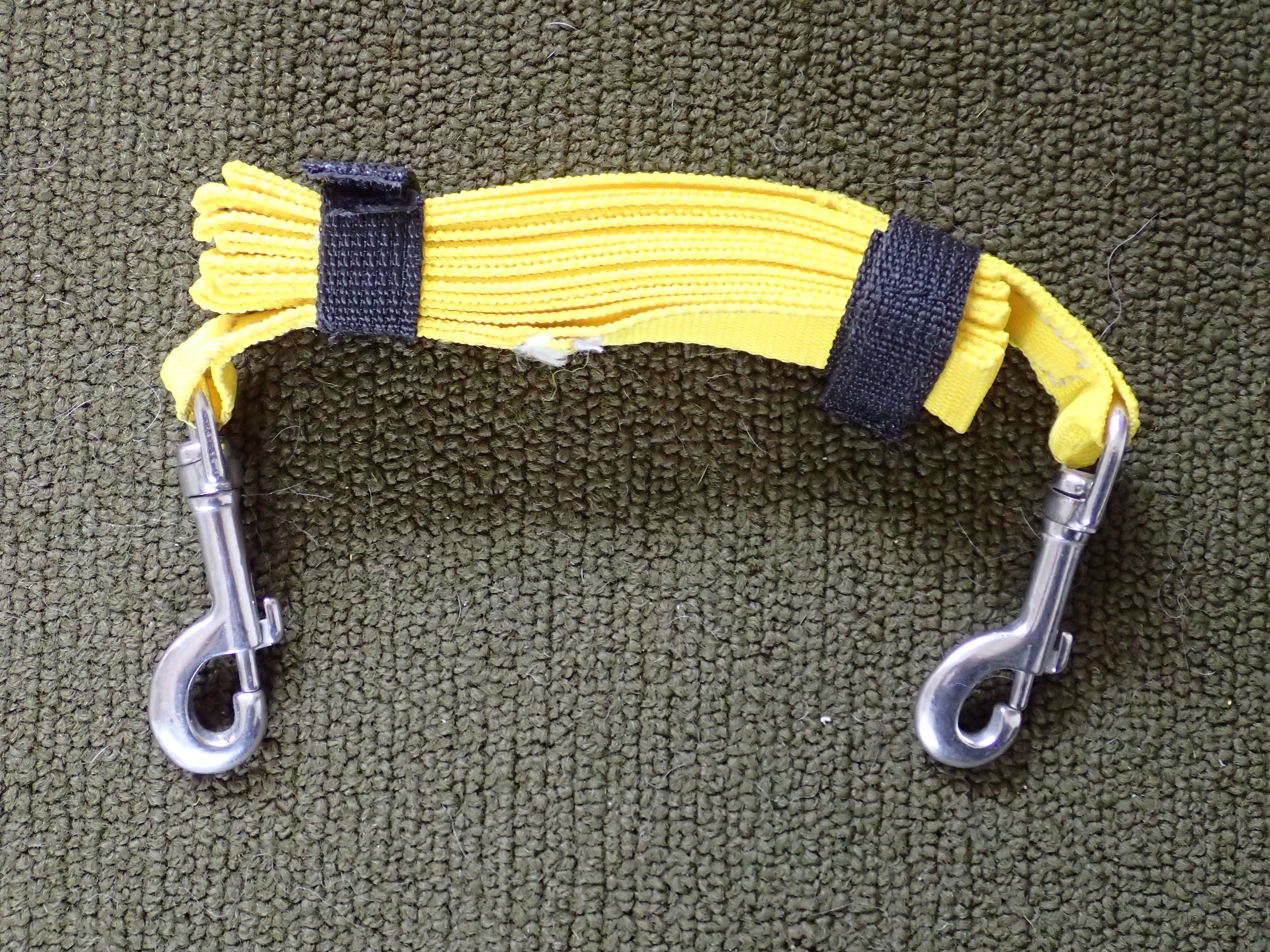
Webbing jon-line with bolt snaps, folded and bundled using velcro tabs

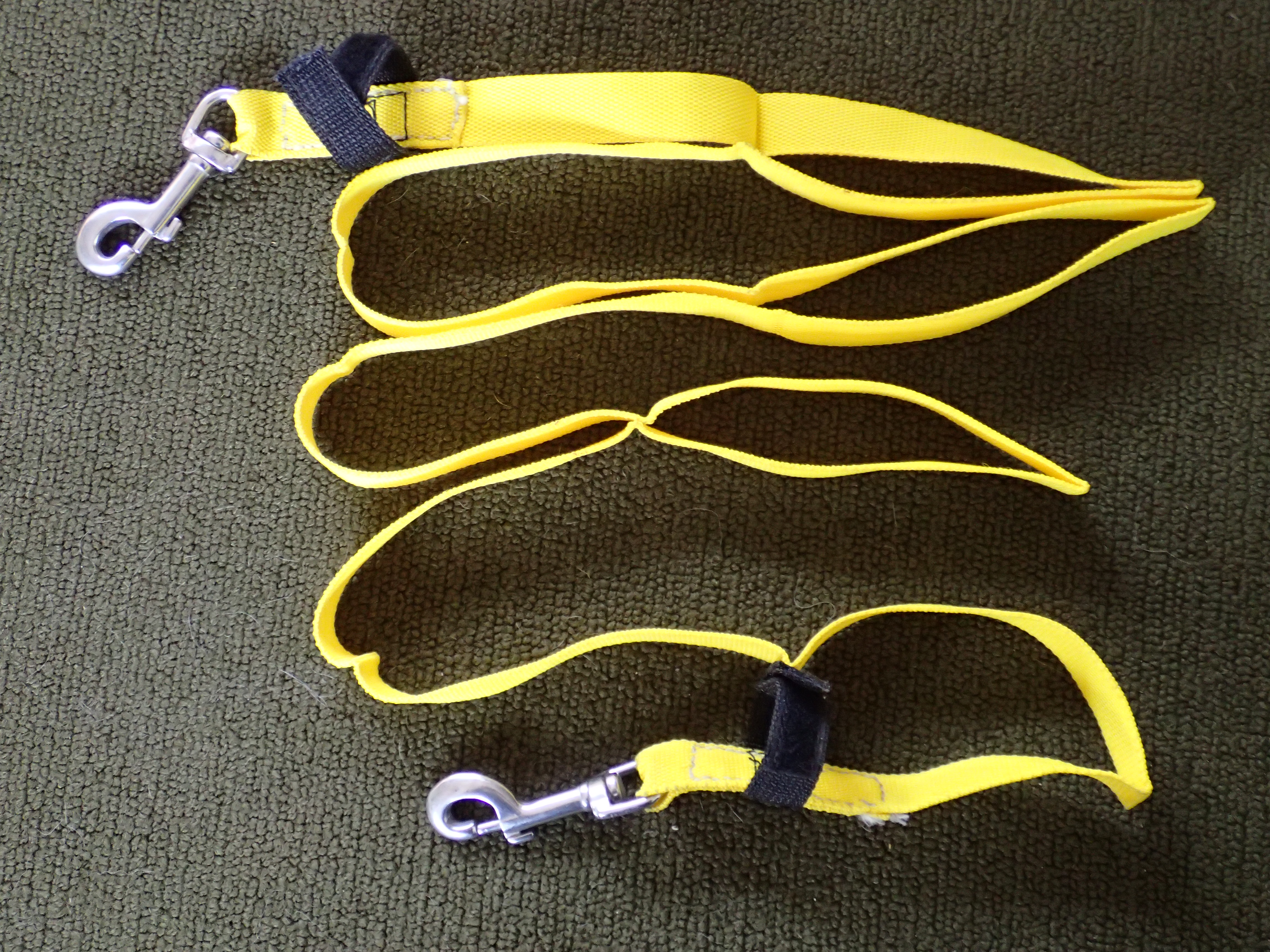
Webbing jon-line with bolt snaps

A jonline (also jon-line or jon line) is a short line used by scuba divers to fasten themselves to something. The original purpose was to fasten a diver to a shot line during decompression stops in current. The line is typically around 1 m (3 feet) long and equipped with a clip at each end. One clip is fastened to the diver's harness, and the other is used to fasten the line to the shot line or anchor line. In current this relieves the diver from holding on to the line during the decompression stop, and the horizontal length of the line will absorb some or all of the vertical movement of the shot line or anchor line due to wave action.

The jonline is named after Jon Hulbert, who is credited with its invention.

A jonline can also be used to tether the diver's equipment to the dive boat before or after the dive. This helps the diver to put on or take off the equipment while in the water without drifting away from the boat. It is similar to a buddy line, which is used to tether two divers together during a dive.

==== Decompression trapezes ====
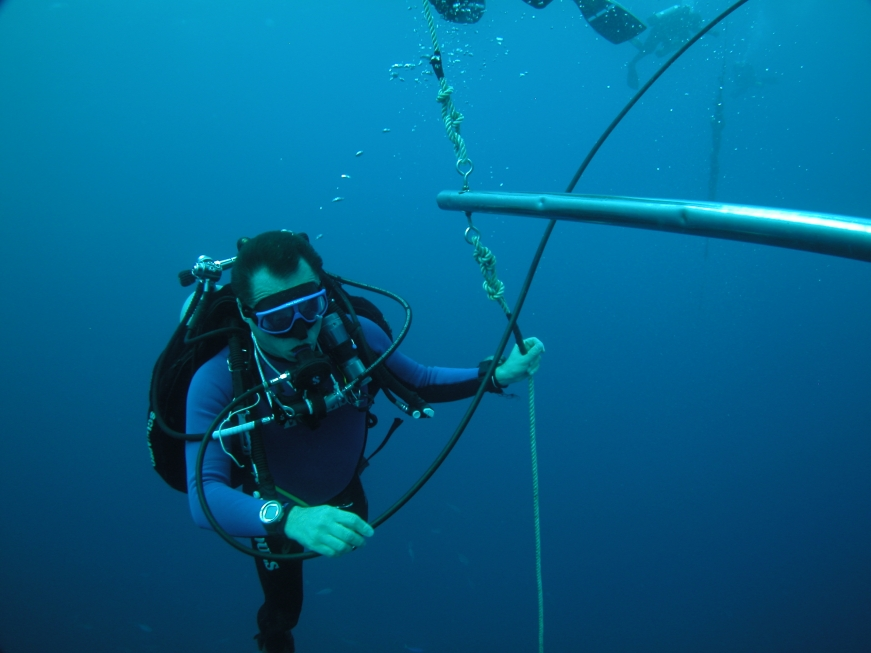
Scuba diver decompressing on decompression trapeze using surface supplied gas

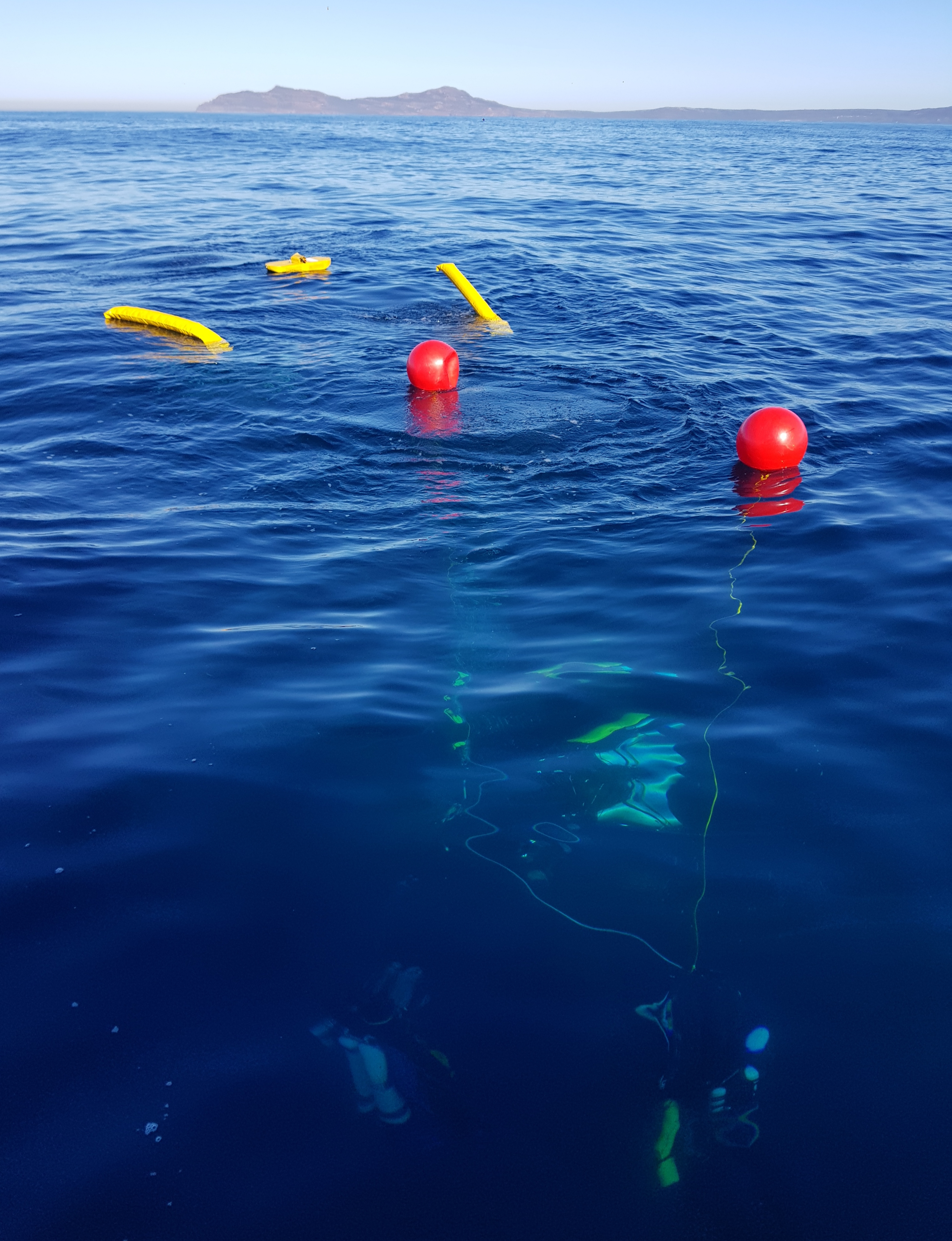
Divers decompressing at the trapeze which was lowered into the water when the second DSMB was deployed as a signal

A decompression trapeze or decompression bar is a device used in recreational diving and technical diving to make decompression stops more comfortable and more secure and provide the divers' surface cover with a visual reference for the divers' position.

It consists of a horizontal bar or bars suspended at the depth of intended decompression stops by buoys. The bars are of sufficient weight and the buoys of sufficient buoyancy that the trapeze will not easily change depth in turbulent water or if the divers experience buoyancy control problems.

Trapezes are often used with diving shots. When diving in tidal waters at the end of slack water, the trapeze may be released from the diving shot to drift in the current as the divers make their decompression stops. A decompression trapeze may also be deployed in response to a signal from the divers, in which case some care must be taken not to hit a diver while lowering the bar.

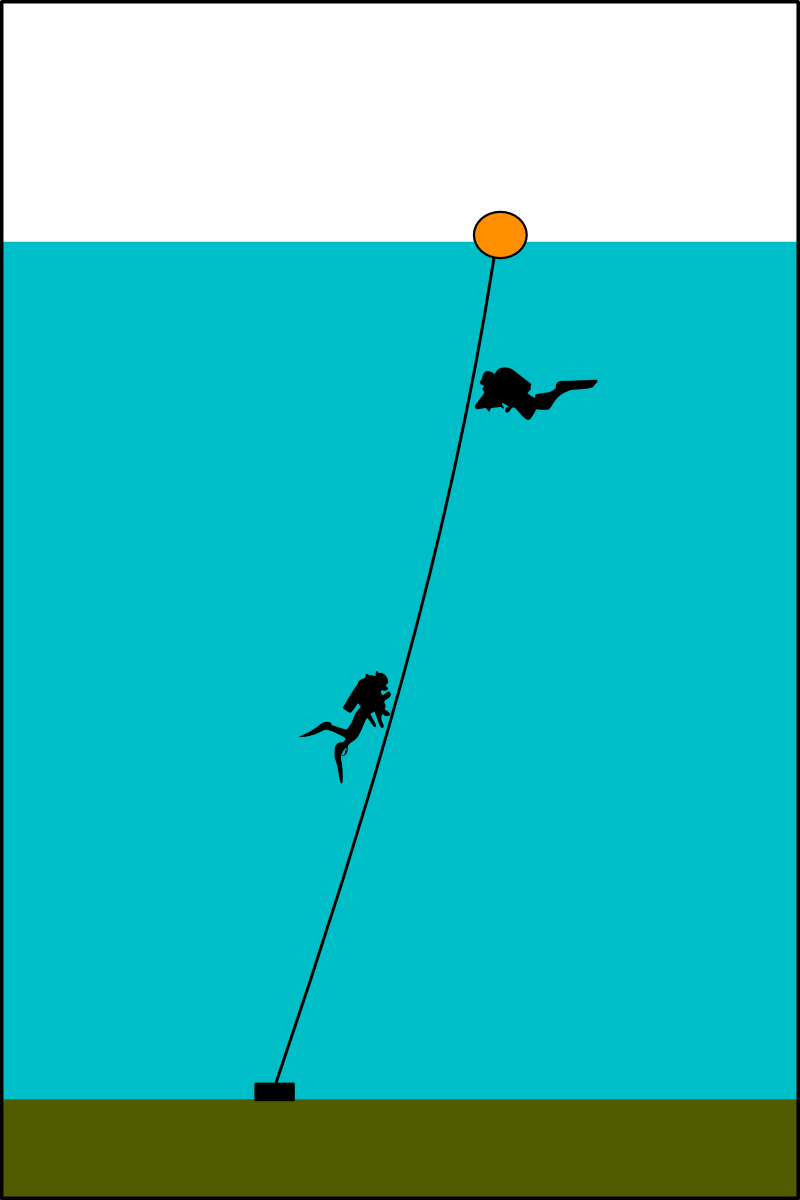
Basic shotline: Weight, and float connected by a line

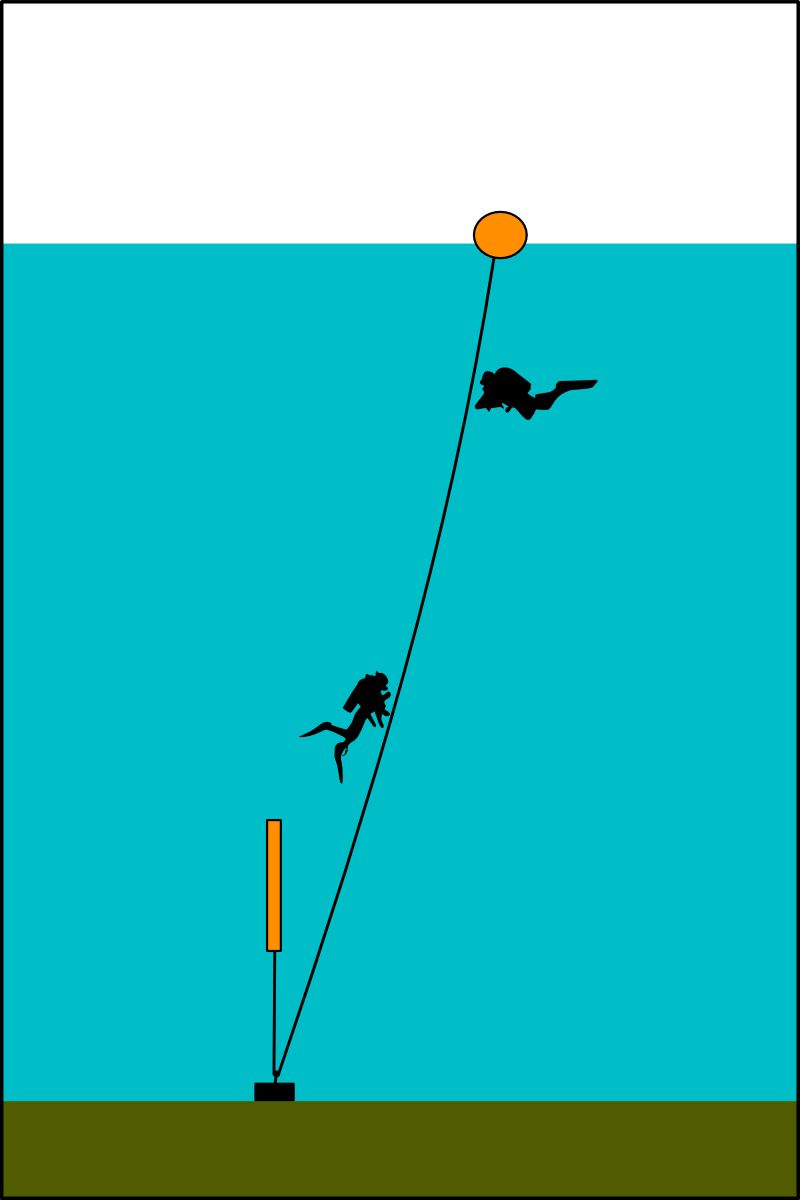
Bottom tensioned shotline: The line passes through a ring at the weight and is tensioned by a small float, often a small lift bag which can later help lift the shot as the air expands.

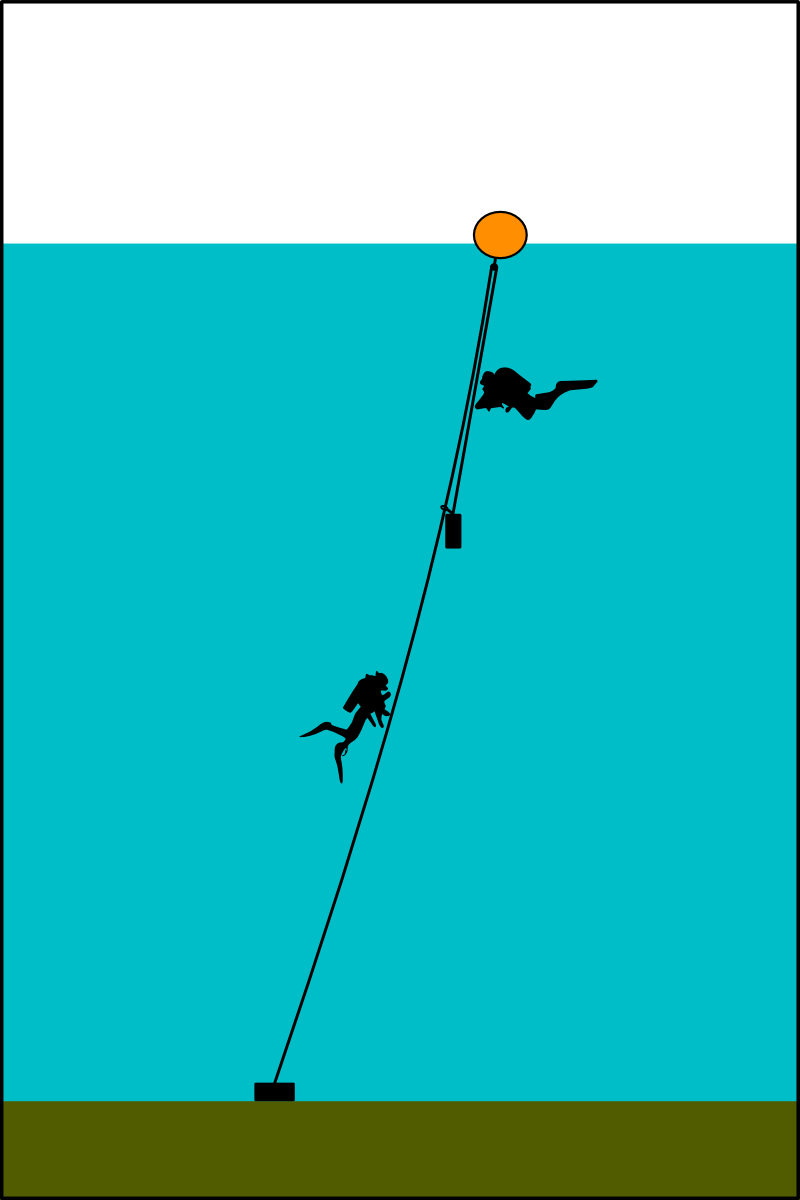
Top tensioned shotline: The line passes through a ring at the float and is tensioned by a smaller weight hanging from it. This weight may be hooked to the main part of the line by a sliding clip to restrain it from swinging.

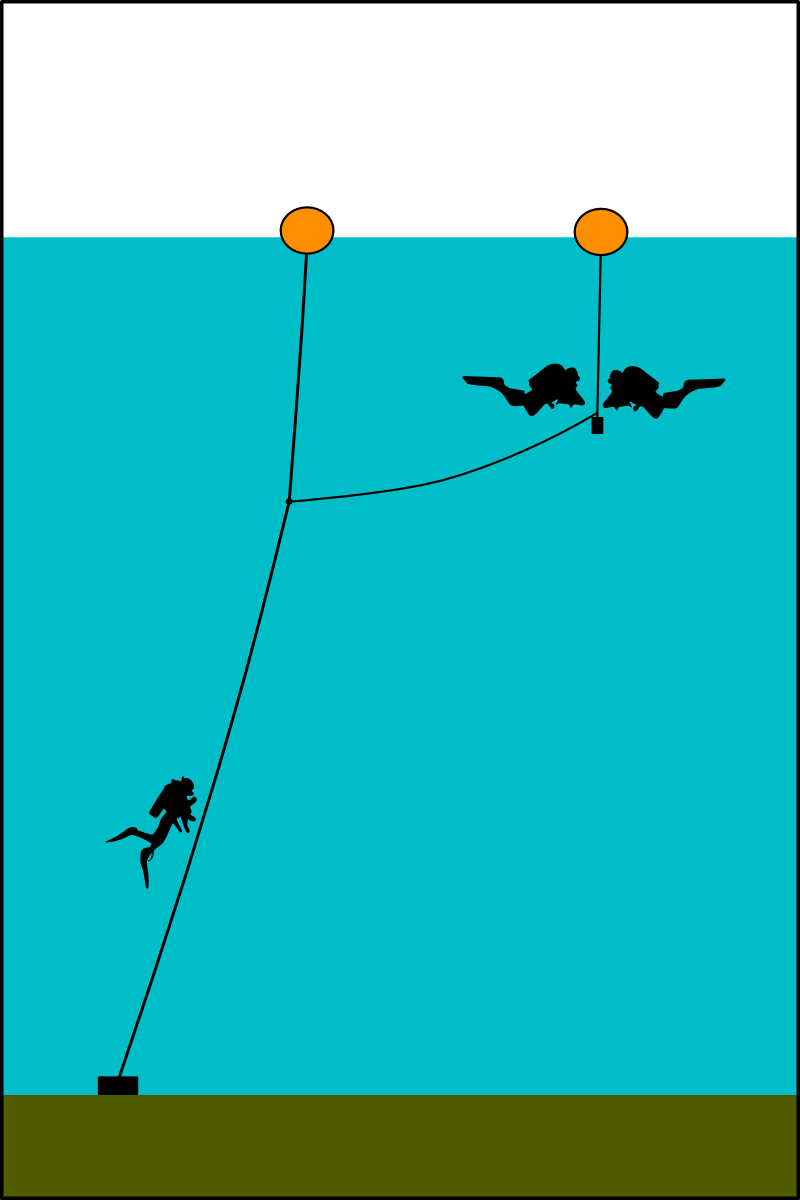
A shotline with a lazy shot – a second float with a short weighted line tethered to it at just below the depth of the deepest long decompression stop

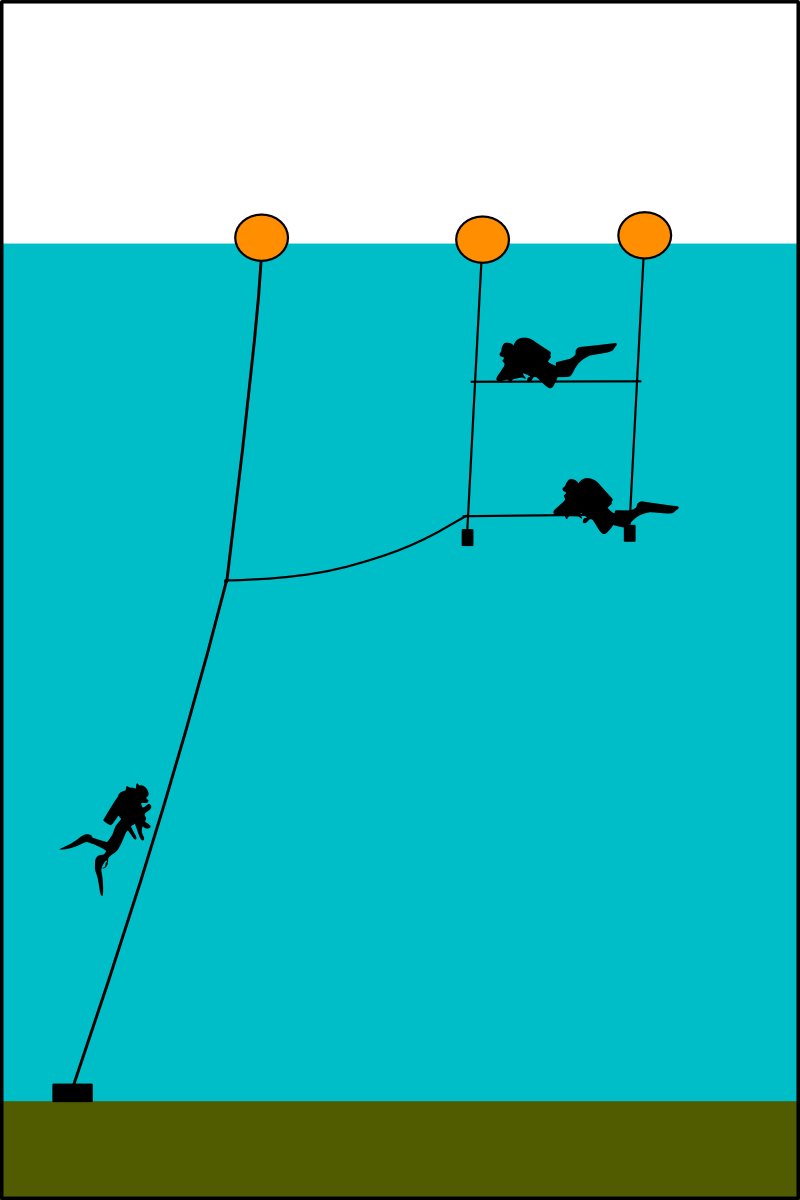
A shotline with a decompression trapeze – a series of crossbars suspended from a float at each end and ballasted as necessary, tethered to the main shotline

=== Downline ===
A downline is a rope leading from the surface down to the underwater workplace. It allows a commercial diver to travel directly to and from the job site and to control rate of descent and ascent in the same way as using a shotline. Also sometimes called a jackstay.

A downline used for open ocean diving is much the same as a shotline, but does not reach all the way to the bottom. This may also be referred to as a lazy shot. An open-ocean downline is weighted at the bottom, and attached to a substantial float at the surface, which may be tethered to the boat. It may be marked at intervals by knots or loops, and may be attached to a decompression trapeze system. In some cases a sea anchor may be used to limit wind drift, particularly if attached to a boat with significant windage.

=== Upline ===
Also known as a Jersey upline, an upline is a line deployed by the diver, and fixed to the bottom, usually on a wreck, to serve as a position and depth control during offshore ascents in moderate currents, where the diver wants to prevent excessive drift during decompression. The bio-degradable natural fibre line is carried on a spool and deployed connected to an inflatable decompression buoy or lift bag at the end of the dive, and the bottom end tied off to the wreck. After completing decompression and surfacing, the diver cuts the line free at the buoy, and the line sinks and naturally decomposes over a few months.

==== Positive buoyancy emergency ascent upline ====
A positive buoyancy emergency ascent can be made using an upline for depth control. This is also known as a tethered ascent, emergency tethered ascent or buoyant tethered ascent. This procedure is used for emergency ascent when the diver is unable to establish neutral to negative buoyancy, or when this is expected to occur at some point during the ascent, and the diver has a decompression obligation, as when ballast weights have been lost, but the diver is still at the bottom and has a ratchet reel with sufficient line. In this case the reel line is tied off to a sufficiently heavy or fixed object on the bottom, and the diver ascends at the appropriate rate paying out line under tension, and making the required decompression stops. It will generally be necessary to cut the line after surfacing, unless another diver is available to go down to release it. This is a required skill for the CMAS Self-Rescue Diver certification.

=== Surface marker buoy and delayed surface marker buoy ===
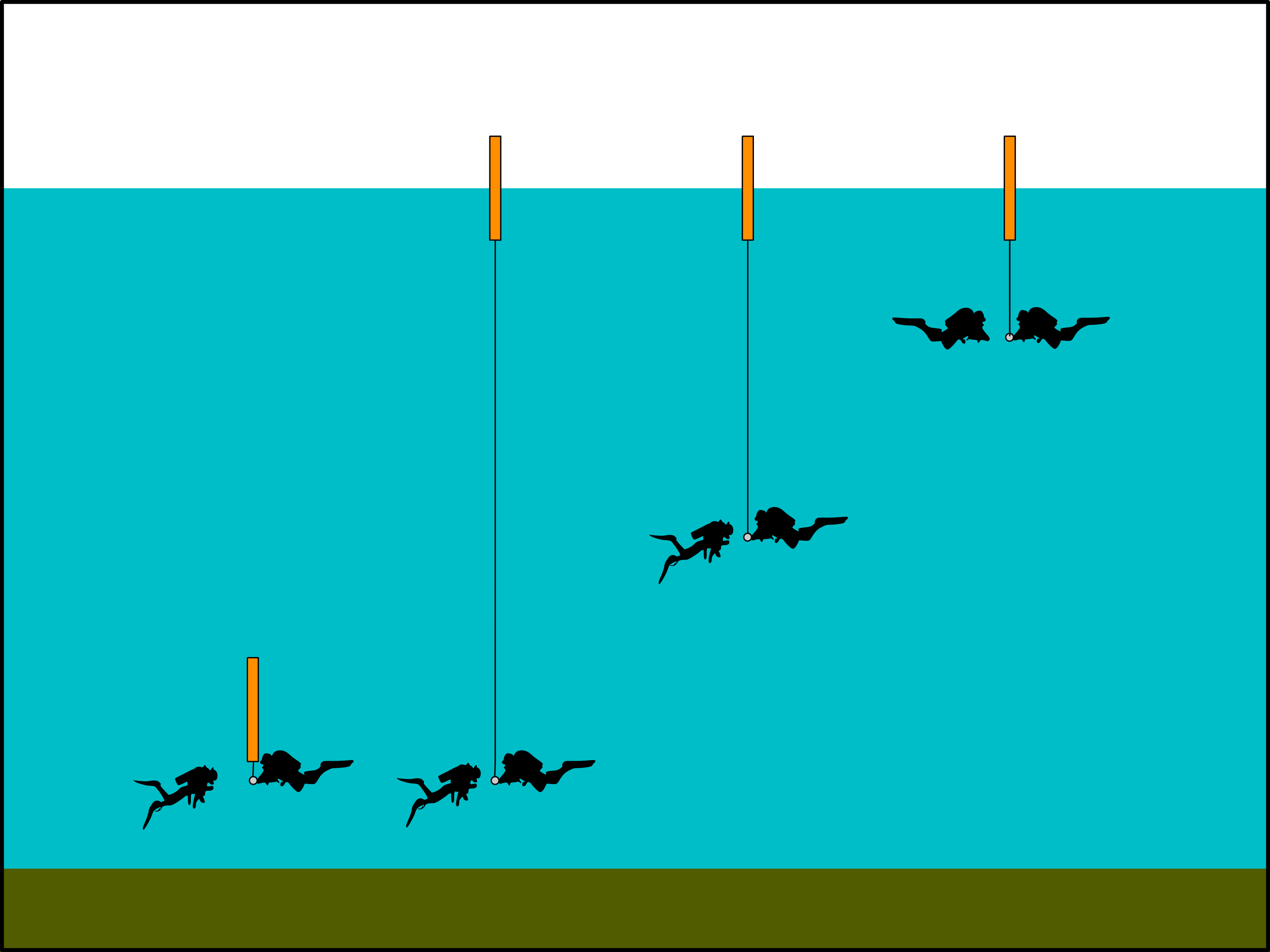
Four stages of scuba ascent with delayed surface marker buoy: Preparation, deployment, ascent, decompression stop

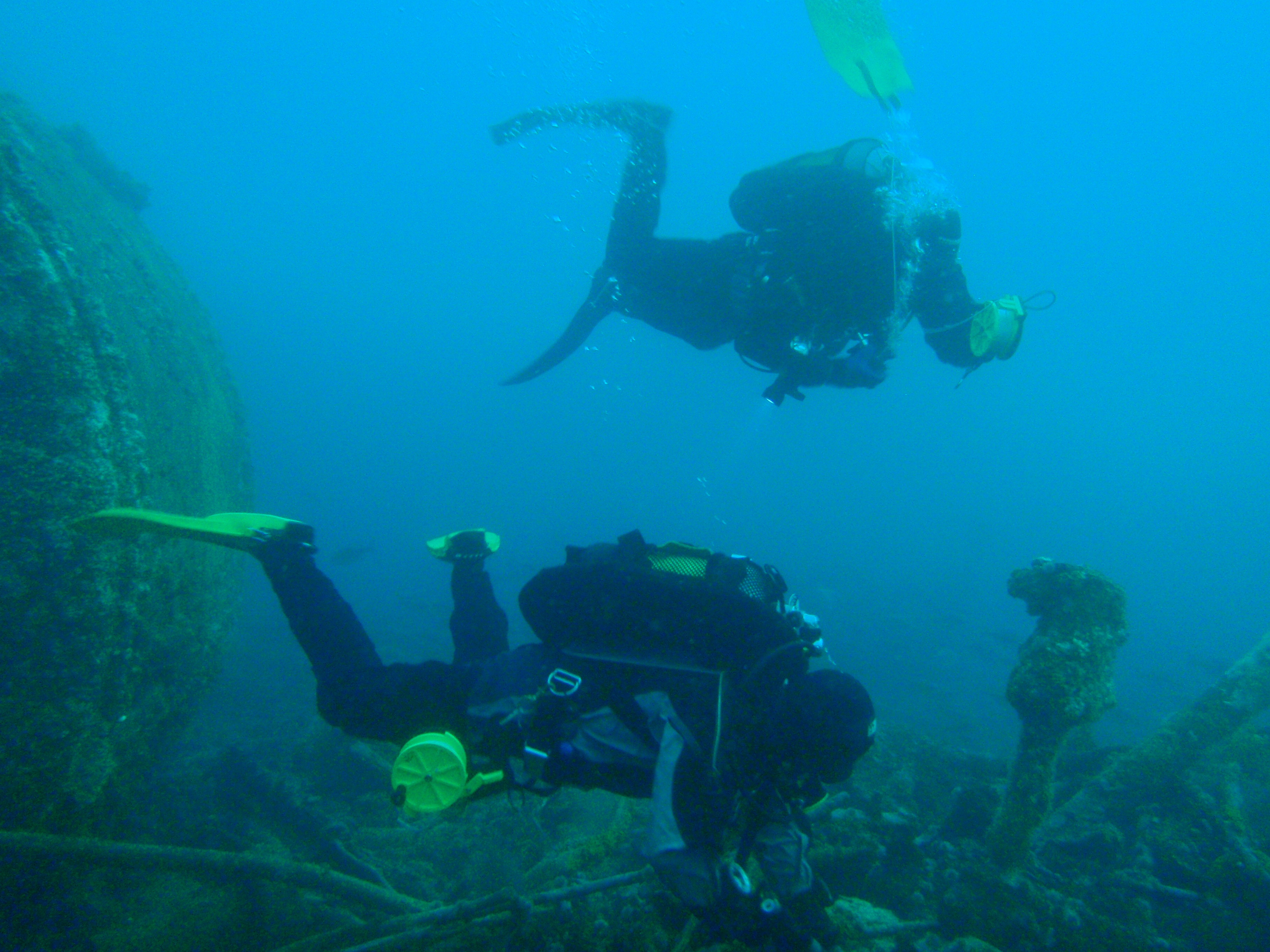
Diver deploying a DSMB

A surface marker buoy (SMB) with a reel and line is often used by a dive leader to allow the boat to monitor progress of the dive group. This can provide the operator with a positive control of depth, by remaining slightly negative and using the buoyancy of the float to support this slight over-weighting. This allows the line to be kept under slight tension which reduces the risk of entanglement. The reel or spool used to store and roll up the line usually has slightly negative buoyancy, so that if released it will hang down and not float away.

A delayed or deployable surface marker buoy (DSMB), also known a decompression buoy, is a soft inflatable tube that is attached to a reel or spool line at one end, and is inflated by the diver under water and released to float to the surface, running out the line as it ascends. This provides information to the surface that the diver is about to ascend, and from where. This equipment is commonly used by recreational and technical divers, and requires a certain level of skill to operate safely. Once deployed, it can be used for the same purposes as the standard surface marker and reel, and in the same way, but they are mostly used to signal the boat that the diver has started ascent, as a means of accurately controlling ascent rate and stop depth, or to indicate a problem in technical diving.

=== Decompression station ===
A decompression station is a place set up to facilitate the planned decompression for a technical dive team, and to help a group of divers stay together during long decompression. A simple example would be a decompression trapeze system linked to the shotline or the dive boat. The decompression station may also have backup equipment stored in case of emergency, and provides a visual depth reference, and a physical aid to maintaining a constant depth. More complex systems may include a small underwater habitat.

In cases where a decompression habitat is used, there may be less exposure to cold water if the divers can partly or completely exit the water into an air-filled space, equivalent to an open diving bell. A habitat type decompression station can be an advantage when doing long decompressions on high oxygen partial pressure as the risks associated with oxygen toxicity are reduced, and it is easier for safety divers to assist. The term decompression station is associated with technical diving, professional divers would generally use a wet or dry diving bell for the same purpose.

=== Diving stages and wet bells ===
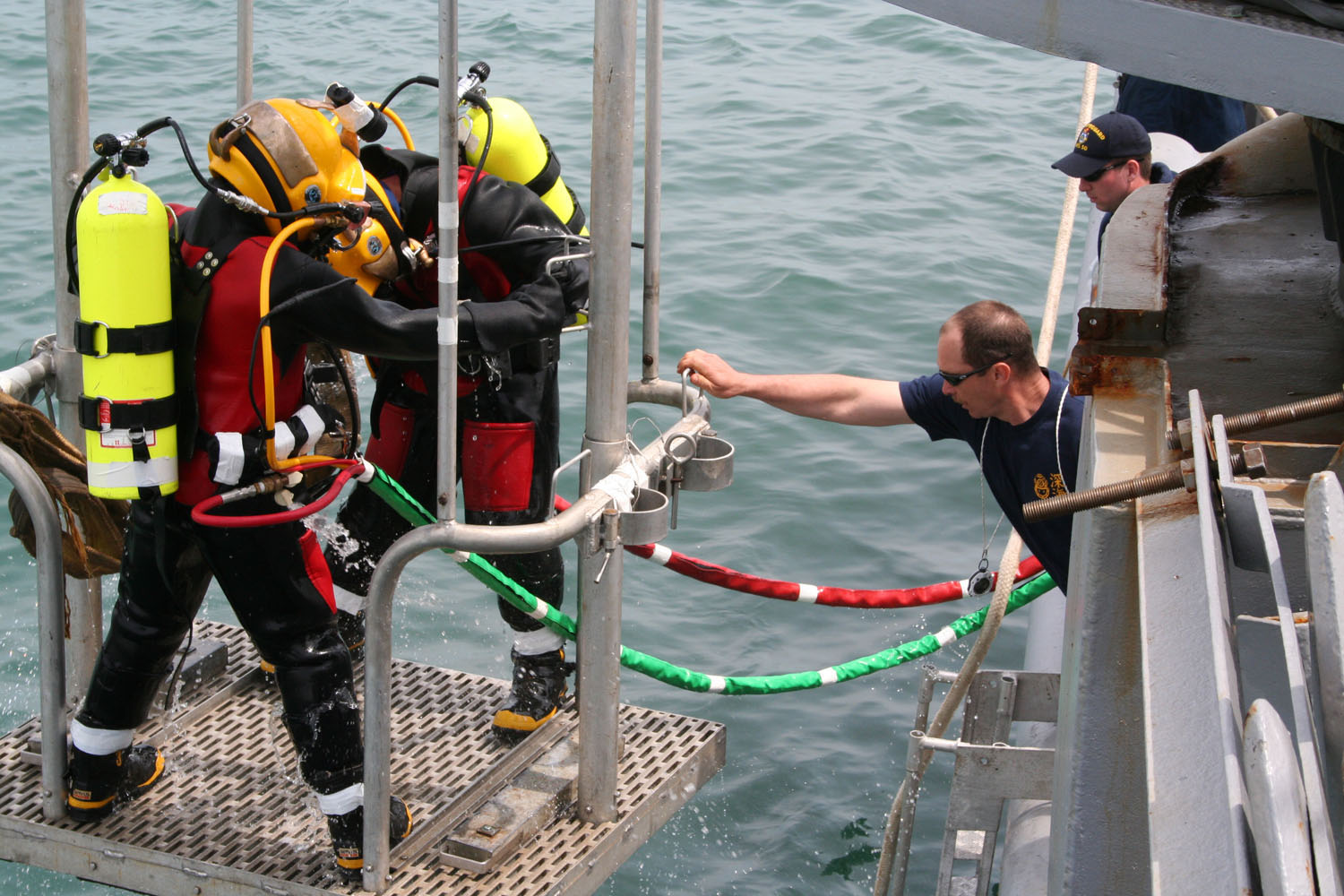
Diving stage

A diving stage, sometimes known as a diving basket, is a platform on which one or two divers stand which is hoisted into the water, lowered to the workplace or the bottom, and then hoisted up again to return the diver to the surface and out of the water. This equipment is almost exclusively used by surface supplied professional divers, as it requires fairly complex man-rated lifting equipment. A diving stage allows the surface team to conveniently manage a diver's decompression as it can be hoisted at a controlled rate and stopped at the correct depth for decompression stops, and allows the divers to rest during the ascent. It also allows the divers to be relatively safely and conveniently lifted out of the water and returned to the deck or quayside.

A wet bell, or open bell, is similar to a diving stage in concept, but has an air space, open to the water at the bottom in which the divers, or at least their heads, can shelter during ascent and descent. A wet bell provides more comfort and control than a stage and allows for longer time in the water. Wet bells are used for air and mixed gas diving, and divers can decompress using oxygen from a mask at 12 m.

The launch and recovery system (LARS) is the equipment used to deploy and recover a stage or diving bell. The sane name is applied to the equipment used to launch and recover small submersibles and ROVs.

== Decompression gas ==
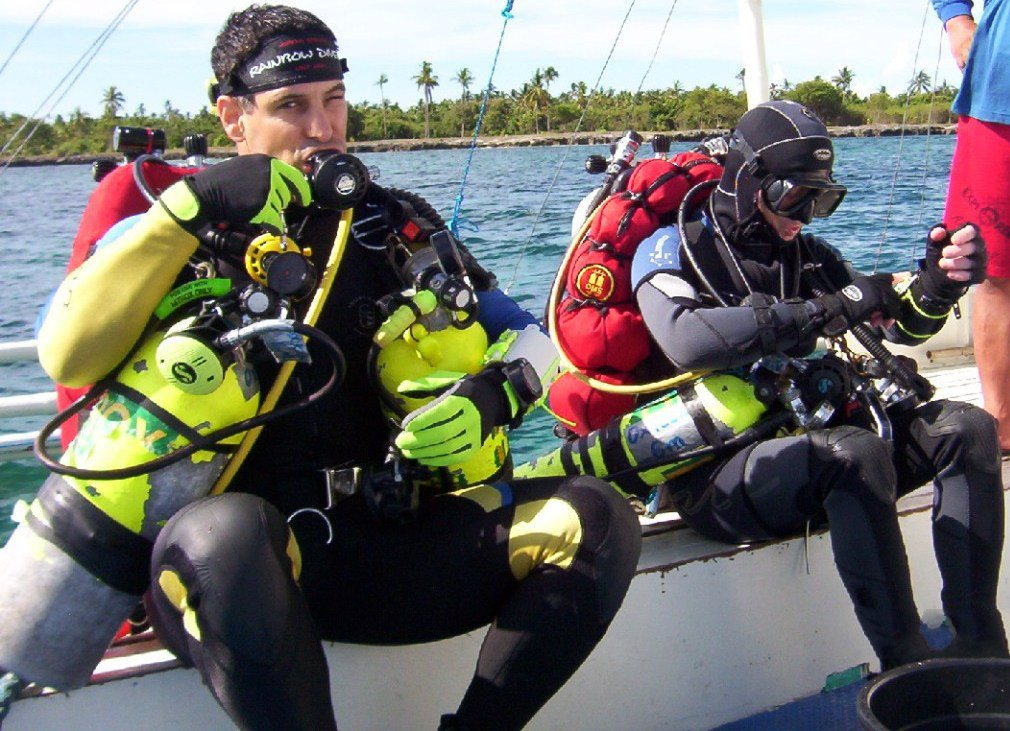
Technical divers preparing for a mixed-gas decompression dive. Note the backplate and wing setup with side mounted stage tanks containing EAN50 (left side) and pure oxygen (right side).

Reducing the partial pressure of the inert gas component of the breathing mixture will accelerate decompression as the concentration gradient will be greater for a given depth. This is achieved by increasing the fraction of oxygen in the breathing gas used, whereas substitution of a different inert gas will not produce the desired effect. Substitution may introduce counter-diffusion complications, owing to differing rates of diffusion of the inert gases, which can lead to a net gain in total dissolved gas tension in a tissue. This can lead to bubble formation and growth, with decompression sickness as a consequence. Partial pressure of oxygen is usually limited to 1.6 bar during in-water decompression for scuba divers, but can be up to 1.9 bar in-water and 2.2 bar in the chamber when using the US Navy tables for surface decompression, and up to 2.8 bar for therapeutic decompression.

=== Stage cylinders ===
Open circuit scuba divers by definition are independent of surface supply, and must take any gas mixture with them that is to be used on the dive. However, if they are confident of returning by a specific route, the decompression gas may be stored at appropriate places on that route. The cylinders used for this purpose are called stage cylinders, and they are usually provided with a standard regulator and a submersible pressure gauge, and are usually left at the stop with the regulator pressurised, but the cylinder valve turned off to minimise the risk of gas loss. Similar cylinders are carried by the divers when the route back is not secure. They are commonly mounted as sling cylinders, clipped to D-rings at the sides of the diver's harness.

Scuba divers take great care to avoid breathing oxygen enriched "deco gas" at great depths because of the high risk of oxygen toxicity. To prevent this happening, cylinders containing oxygen-rich gases must always be positively identifiable. One way of doing this is by marking them with their maximum operating depth as clearly as possible. Other safety precautions may include using different coloured regulator housing, flavoured mouthpieces, or simply placing a rubber band vertically across the mouthpiece as an alert.

=== Surface panel gas switching ===
Surface supplied divers may be supplied with a gas mixture suitable for accelerated decompression by connecting a supply to the surface gas panel and connecting it through the valve system to the divers. This allows accelerated decompression, usually on oxygen, which can be used to a maximum depth of 20 ft (6 m) in water for scuba and 30 ft (9 m) on surface supply. Surface supplied heliox bounce divers will be provided with mixtures suitable for their current depth, and the mixture may be changed several times during descent and ascent from great depths.

=== Continuously variable mixture in closed circuit rebreathers ===
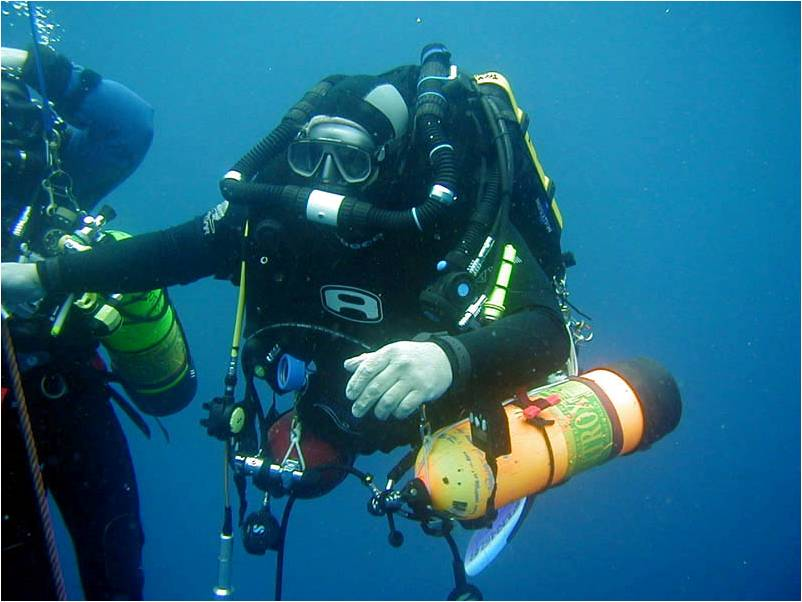
Rebreather diver with bailout and decompression cylinders

Closed circuit rebreathers are usually controlled to provide a fairly constant partial pressure of oxygen during the dive (set point), and may be reset to a richer mix (higher partial pressure of oxygen) for decompression. The effect is to keep the partial pressure of inert gases as low as safely practicable throughout the dive. This minimises the absorption of inert gas in the first place, and accelerates the elimination of the inert gases during ascent.

== Surface decompression equipment ==
=== Deck decompression chambers ===
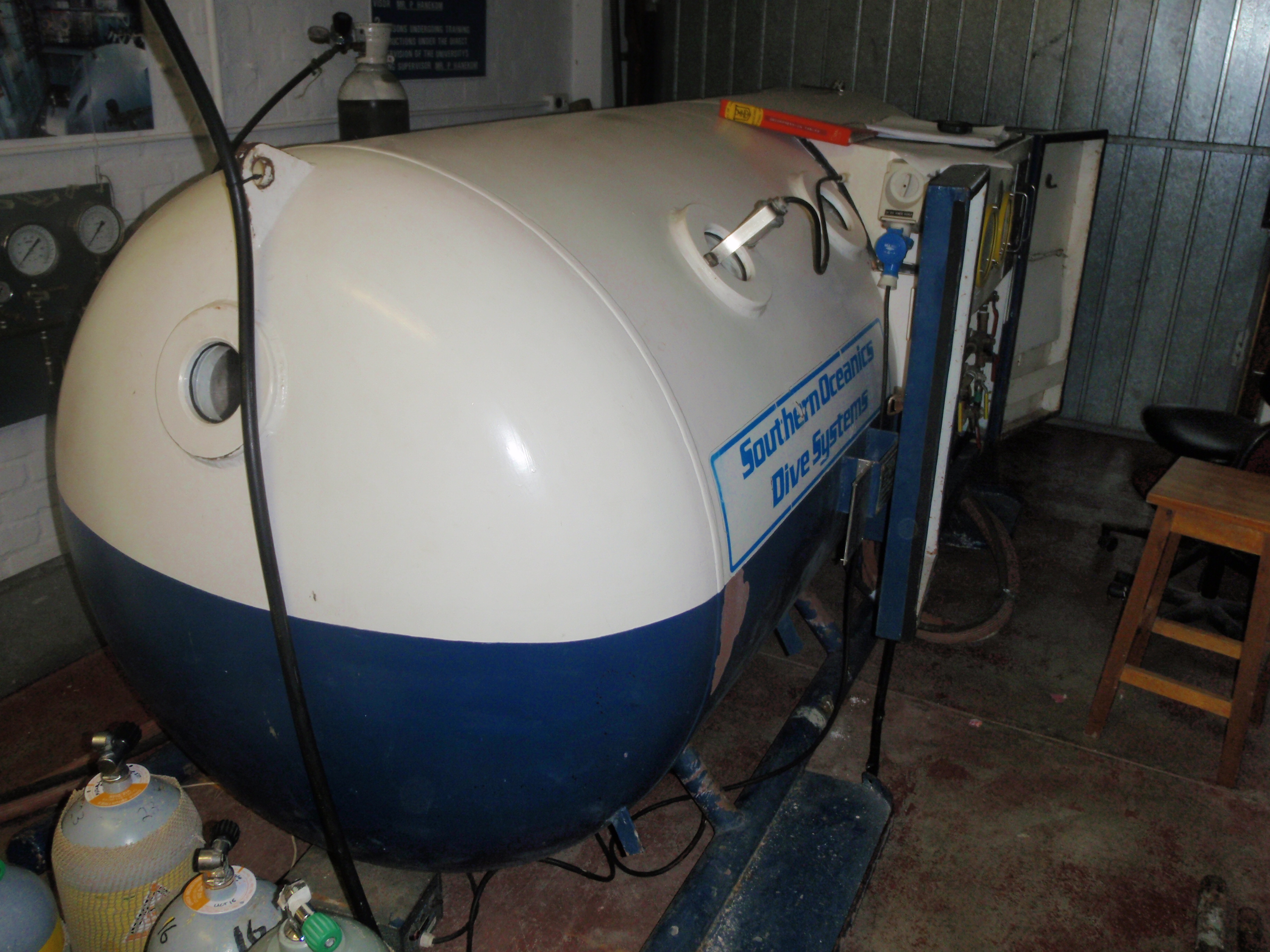
A basic deck decompression chamber

A deck decompression chamber (DDC), or double-lock chamber is a two compartment pressure vessel for human occupation which has sufficient space in the main chamber for two or more occupants, and a forechamber which can allow a person to be pressurised or decompressed while the main chamber remains under constant pressure. This allows an attendant to be locked in or out during treatment of the occupant(s) of the main chamber. There is usually also a medical lock, which serves a similar function but is much smaller. This is used to transfer medical material, food and specimens into and out of the main chamber while it is under pressure. Most deck decompression chambers are fitted with built-in breathing systems (BIBS), which supply an alternative breathing gas to the occupants (usually oxygen), and discharge the exhaled gas outside the chamber, so the chamber gas is not excessively enriched by oxygen, which would cause an unacceptable fire hazard, and require frequent flushing with chamber gas (usually air).

A deck decompression chamber is intended for surface decompression and emergency hyperbaric treatment of divers, but can be used for other hyperbaric treatment under the appropriate supervision of hyperbaric medical personnel.

Portable or mobile one and two occupant single compartment chambers are not generally intended for routine surface decompression, but may be used in an emergency.

=== Dry bells and Saturation systems ===
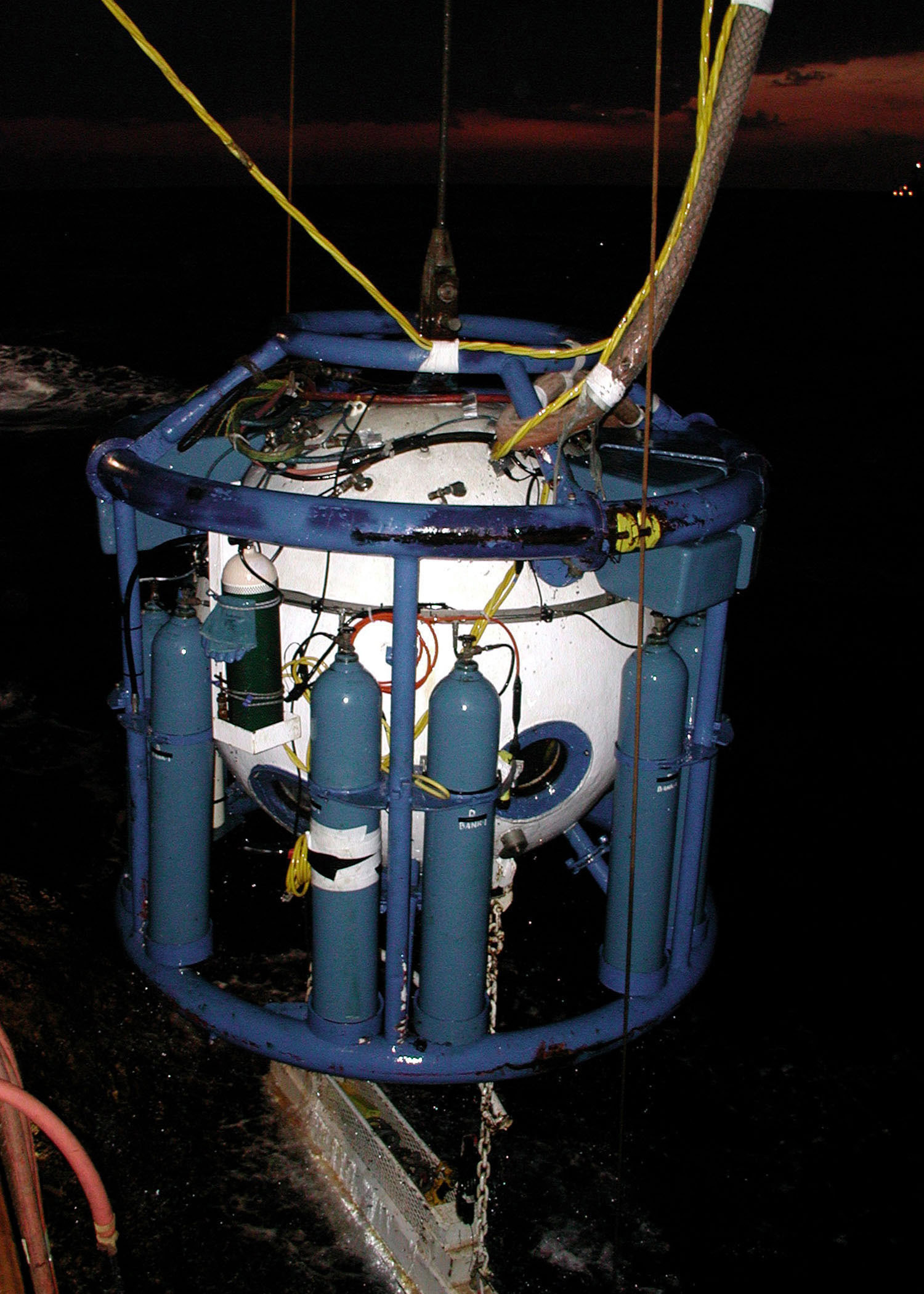
Personnel transfer capsule, closed bell, or dry bell

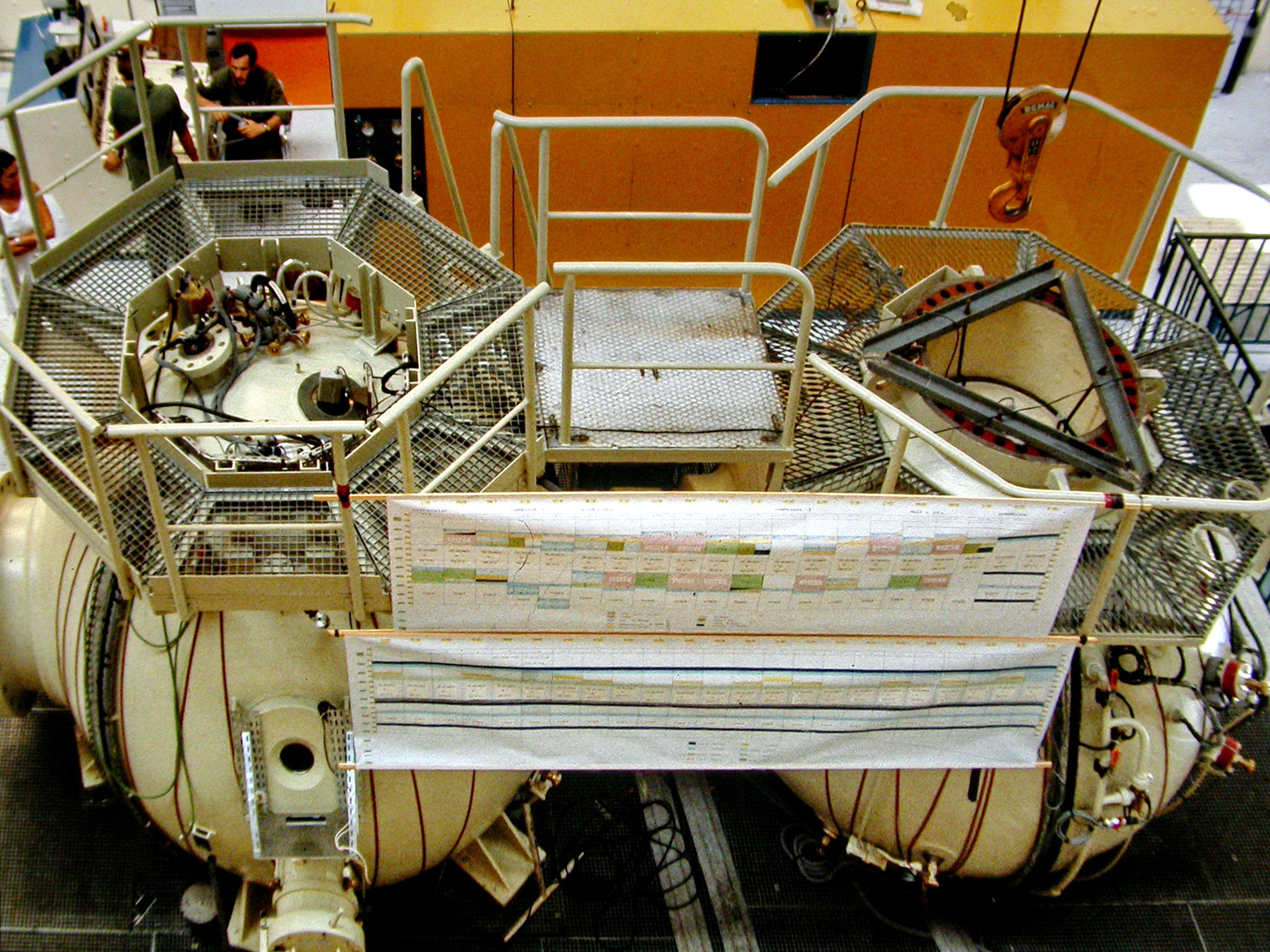
Part of a saturation system: On the left is a part of the living space with a medical lock in the foreground. To the right is the wet-room, on the top of which there is a flange to which the dry bell is bolted for transfer of the divers between the hyperbaric habitat and the bell.

A "Saturation System" or "Saturation spread" typically includes a living chamber, transfer chamber and submersible decompression chamber, which is commonly referred to in commercial diving and military diving as the diving bell, PTC (Personnel Transfer Capsule) or SDC (Submersible Decompression Chamber). The system can be permanently installed on a ship or ocean platform, but is more commonly capable of being dismantled and moved from one vessel to another by crane. The entire system is managed from a control room, commonly referred to as the "van", where depth, chamber atmosphere and other system parameters are monitored and controlled. The diving bell is the elevator or lift that transfers divers from the system to the work site. Typically, it is mated to the system utilizing a removable clamp and is separated from the system tankage bulkhead by a trunking space, a kind of short tunnel, through which the divers transfer to and from the bell. At the completion of work or a mission, the saturation diving team is decompressed gradually back to atmospheric pressure by the slow venting of system pressure, at rates of about of 15 to 30 msw (50 to 100 fsw) per day, (schedules vary). Thus the process involves only one ascent, thereby mitigating the time-consuming and comparatively risky process of multiple decompressions normally associated with non-saturation ("bounce diving") operations. The chamber gas mixture is typically controlled to maintain a nominally constant partial pressure of oxygen of between 0.3 and 0.5 bar during most of the decompression (0.44 to 0.48 bar on US Navy schedule), which is below the upper limit for long term exposure. NOAA has used rather different saturation decompression schedules for relatively shallow (less than 100 fsw) air and nitrox saturation dives, which use oxygen breathing when pressure is reduced to less than 55 fsw.

The divers use surface supplied umbilical diving equipment, using a breathing gas suitable for the depth and pressure, such as helium and oxygen mixtures, stored in large capacity, high pressure cylinders. The gas supplies are plumbed to a control panel in the control room, where they are routed to supply the system components. The bell is fed via a large, multi-part umbilical that supplies breathing gas, electrical power, cable communications and hot water, and may return exhaled gas to the surface for recycling. The bell also is fitted with externally-mounted breathing gas storage cylinders for emergency use. The divers are supplied from the bell through personal excursion umbilicals.

A hyperbaric lifeboat or hyperbaric rescue unit may be provided for emergency evacuation of saturation divers from a saturation system. This would be used if the platform is at immediate risk due to fire or sinking, and allows the divers under saturation to get clear of the immediate danger. A hyperbaric lifeboat may be self-propelled and can be operated by unpressurised crew while the occupants are under pressure. It must be self-sufficient for several days at sea, in case of a delay in rescue due to sea conditions. The crew would normally start decompression as soon as safely possible after launching.

A dry bell may also be used for bounce dives to great depths, and then used as the decompression chamber during the ascent and later on board the support vessel. In this case it is not always necessary to transfer into a deck chamber, as the bell is quite capable of performing this function, though it would be relatively cramped, as a bell is usually as small as conveniently possible to minimise weight for deployment.

== See also ==
- Decompression sickness – Disorder caused by dissolved gases forming bubbles in tissues
- Decompression (diving) – Pressure reduction and its effects during ascent from depth
- Decompression practice – Techniques and procedures for safe decompression of divers
- Decompression theory – Theoretical modelling of decompression physiology
- Dive computer – Instrument to calculate decompression status in real time
- Equivalent air depth – Method of comparing decompression requirements for air and a given nitrox mix
- Equivalent narcotic depth – Method for comparing the narcotic effects of a mixed diving gas with air
- History of decompression research and development
- Hyperbaric treatment schedules – Planned hyperbaric exposure using a specified breathing gas as medical treatment
- Oxygen window – Difference between the partial pressures of oxygen in arterial blood and body tissues
- Physiology of decompression – Physiological basis for decompression theory and practice
- Decompression models:
  - Bühlmann decompression algorithm – Mathematical model of tissue inert gas uptake and release with pressure change
  - Haldane's decompression model – Decompression model developed by John Scott Haldane
  - Reduced gradient bubble model – Decompression algorithm
  - Thalmann algorithm – Mathematical model for diver decompression
  - Thermodynamic model of decompression – Early diving decompression model
  - Varying Permeability Model – Decompression model and algorithm based on bubble physics
