= Howard L. Resnikoff =

American mathematician (1937–2018)

Howard Leonard Resnikoff (May 13, 1937 – March 5, 2018) was an American mathematician and business executive.

Resnikoff was born in New York City on May 13, 1937. He obtained a bachelor's degree from the Massachusetts Institute of Technology and earned a doctorate from the University of California, Berkeley under the supervision of Ádám Korányi. Resnikoff began teaching at Rice University in 1967. He joined the University of California, Irvine faculty in 1975. Between 1979 and 1981, Resnikoff was director of the Division of Information Science and Technology at the National Science Foundation. He became an associate vice president at Harvard University in 1981, serving until 1983. Resnikoff worked for Thinking Machines Corporation and founded Aware, Inc. after leaving Harvard, as well as FutureWave, Inc. He received thirteen patents for a variety of inventions, and in later life served on the board of governors of the Jacobs University Bremen and was president and chairman of the institution's Foundation of America. Resnikoff's wife Joan is a painter and ceramic artist. He died on March 5, 2018.
