= Professional Association of Diving Instructors =

Recreational diver training and certification agency

- Abbreviation: PADI
- Formation: 1966
- Headquarters: Rancho Santa Margarita, California, United States (Americas and Latin America Office)
- Region served: International
- Members: ~128,000 dive professionals, 6,600+ dive centers and resorts
- Leader: Drew Richardson
- Parent organization: PADI Worldwide Corp.
- Affiliations: DSAT; PADI AWARE; Emergency First Response; Current Publishing
- Website: www.padi.com

The Professional Association of Diving Instructors (PADI) is a recreational diving membership and diver training organization founded in 1966 by John Cronin and Ralph Erickson. PADI courses range from entry level to advanced recreational diver certification. Further, they provide several diving skills courses connected with specific equipment or conditions, some diving related informational courses and a range of recreational diving instructor certifications.

They also offer various technical diving courses. As of 2024, PADI claims to have issued 30 million scuba certifications worldwide since 1967. The levels are not specified and may include minor specialisations. Some of the certifications align with WRSTC and ISO standards, and these are recognised worldwide. Some other certification is unique to PADI and has no equivalence anywhere, or may be part of other agencies' standards for certification for more general diving skill levels.

== History ==
In 1966, PADI was founded by John Cronin and Ralph Erickson. Cronin was originally a NAUI instructor who decided to form his own organization with Erickson, and to break diver training down into several modular courses instead of the single universal course then prevalent. Erickson developed continuing education scuba courses during this time and wrote the initial issue of the first trade magazine for scuba instructors, The Undersea Journal. Cronin got the idea for PADI's Positive Identification Card at a trade show. PADI established the Master Scuba Diver certification, the industry's first certification awarded for accumulation of specified certification and experience, and not based on a specific training program, (Note: PADI awards their Master Scuba Diver Recognition to a diver who completes: Advanced Open Water Diver course or equivalent; PADI Rescue Diver course, with Emergency First Response course; any Five different PADI specialty diving courses additional to Rescue Diver and EFR; Logs 50 dives) in 1973, later launching the modular scuba program. By 1979, PADI was producing 100,000 certifications a year after previously hitting 25,000 a year. PADI was the first organization to use confined water or pool dives for training new divers and introduced the PADI Rescue Diver course and manual for rescue training during the 1980s.

The organisation published the Encyclopedia of Recreational Diving in 1988.

In 1989, PADI founded Project AWARE to help conserve underwater environments. In 1992, Project AWARE Foundation became a registered nonprofit organization with an environmental mission and purpose. PADI continues to partner with PADI AWARE, supporting the organization with in-kind services, donations through its processes and connection to the PADI network of divers, dive professionals and dive centers. PADI AWARE information has been integrated in most courses and divers are offered the chance to exchange their normal certification card for an AWARE-certification card by making a donation to the program when sending in their application for a new certification.

In 2006, PADI was severely criticized by a Coroner's court in the United Kingdom for providing what experts regarded as short and insufficient training. Although PADI training standards differ from those formerly prevalent in the United Kingdom under the BSAC system, PADI training standards are consistent with World Recreational Scuba Training Council standards.

On 9 August 2012, Lincolnshire Management and Providence Equity Partners jointly acquired PADI from Seidler Equity Partners. In 2015, Providence Equity Partners acquired majority stake of PADI from Lincolnshire Management.

In 2017, Providence Equity Partners LLC sold PADI to Canadian investment firm Altas Partners and French private equity firm Florac for US$700 million, through an entity called Mandarin fish Holding. The next year, PADI launched PADI Travel, an online dive travel resource and booking platform for dive resort and live-aboard packages.

In 2021, PADI reported it had a membership of over 128,000 professional members and 6,600 dive centers, and had awarded more than 28 million diving certifications internationally. PADI operates in 186 countries and territories. From 2015 to 2020, the average male to female membership split was approximately 63% to 37% respectively. The organization hosts Women's Dive Day events across the globe in an effort to increase awareness for women divers.

Canadian investment firm Altas Partners and French private equity firm Florac sold PADI to an undisclosed owner in 2025.

== Training system ==
PADI courses are performance-based diver training (Note: A system of learning based on the learner performing tasks to demonstrate knowledge and skills) programs, and at the introductory level emphasizes practical knowledge, safety and motor skills. The basics of diving physics and physiology are introduced during entry level programs. The details of these concepts are left for later courses when they are necessary for the required competences of the specific training. According to PADI, these practices fall within current modern learning philosophies and receive regular updates via peer review.

The PADI training system is composed of modules with standardized learning objectives divided into theory and practical skills development. Each module is a stand-alone course for which certification is provided to the participant on successful completion of the course. Theory is mainly conveyed by way of self-study using books or digital training using PADI E-Learning. All study options are supplemented with video and, in most cases, live instruction to help the participant visualize what they have read. Confirmation of the student diver's level of competence in standardized knowledge review sessions is carried out by a scuba instructor using both written tests and personal observation during dives to verify the student's knowledge and skills. Practical skills are obtained through confined water training (pools or relatively shallow water) and performance evaluations in open water.

PADI courses target four progressive experience demographics, designated by PADI as "Youth", "Beginner", "Continuing Education" and "Professional". Options are available for students or instructors to attain additional certifications across a range of categories, including "Essentials", (Note: Skills useful for reducing risk to the divers themselves.) "Safety Focus", (Note: Skills helpful for assisting another diver.) "Advanced Skills", (Note: General diving skills beyond the minimum necessary for acceptable personal safety in benign conditions – more advanced than basic entry level requirements.) "Cold Water", (Note: In reality, night and cavern diving do not imply cold water.) "Conservation", (Note: Basic ecological awareness and how to avoid doing direct environmental harm.) "Photography", "Discovery", (Note: Introductory experiences with more complex scuba equipment, no certification.) "Freediving" and "Technical Diving".

For the youth demographic, the Padi Seal Team and Bubblemaker Programs are provided for students ages 8+.

As of 2023, the courses in "Beginner", "Continuing Education" and "Professional" categories include:

	Beginner	Continuing Education	Professional
Essentials	Discover Scuba Diving; Scuba Diver; Open Water Diver	Advanced Open Water Diver; Enriched Air (Nitrox) Diver; Night Diver; Diver Against Debris	Dive Theory; Emergency First Response Instructor; Assistant Instructor; Divemaster; Open Water Scuba Instructor
Safety Focus	Emergency First Response: Primary and Secondary Care; Emergency First Response: CPR & AED; Emergency First Response: Care for Children	Rescue Diver; Public Safety Diver; Emergency Oxygen Provider; Adaptive Support Diver; Delayed Surface Marker Buoy (DSMB) Diver	
Advanced Skills		Adventure Diver; Peak Performance Buoyancy; Underwater Navigator; Deep Diver; Night Diver; Full Face Mask Diver; Self-Reliant Diver; Drift Diver; Boat Diver; Search and Recovery Diver; Sidemount Rec Diver; Wreck Diver; Equipment Specialist; Diver Propulsion Vehicle; Multlevel Diver; Cavern Diver; Altitude Diver	Master Scuba Diver Trainer; Master Instructor; Speciality Instructor (25+ courses); Adaptive Techniques; IDC Staff Instructor; Course Director
Cold Water		Dry Suit Diver; Ice Diver; Night Diver; Cavern Diver	
Conservation	Padi AWARE Speciality	Underwater Naturalist; Fish Identification; Coral Reef Conservation; Dive Against Debris; AWARE Shark Conservation	
Photography		Digital Underwater Photographer; Underwater Videographer; Self-Reliant Diver; Fish Identification	
Discovery		Discover Technical Diving; Discover Local Diving	
Freediving	Discover Mermaid; Mermaid; Basic Mermaid; Basic Freediver; Freediver; Skindiver	Advanced Mermaid; Advanced Freediver; Master Freediver	Freediver Instructor; Advanced Freediver Instructor; Master Freediver Instructor; Freediver Instructor Trainer
Technical		Discover Technical Diving; Tec Trimix Diver; Tec 40 & Tec 40 Trimix; Tec 45 & Tec 45 Trimix; Tec 50 & Tec 50 Trimix; Tec Trimix 65; Tec Sidemount; Tec Gas Blender; Discover Rebreather Program; Rebreather Diver; Advanced Rebreather Diver; Tec 40 CCR; Tec 60 CCR; Tec 100 CCR	Tec Gas Blender Instructor; Tec Trimix Instructor; Tec Sidemount Instructor; Tec 40 Instructor & Tec 40 Trimix Instructor; Tec 45 Instructor & Tec 45 Trimix Instructor; Tec 50 Instructor & Tec 50 Trimix Instructor; Tec 60 Instructor; Tec 60 CCR Instructor; Tec 100 CCR Instructor

=== Training standards ===
PADI training standards are generally inaccessible to the public via internet search, making an informed decision on whether a specific training course is appropriate to the diver's needs difficult. Those few programs which comply with ISO standards can be assumed to at least nominally include all the requirements of the ISO standard, but not necessarily anything more. Some PADI courses, i.e. those which have no actual diving component, may be presented and assessed by a PADI Divemaster registered with PADI to run the specific course. Some additional training and course attendance is required. These courses do not include actual diving skills, just skills or knowledge that may be useful while diving or interesting in the context of diving.

Some PADI training standards have been found to be ambiguous of contradictory, For example, the PADI Advanced Open Water Diver course does not require direct instructor supervision of a student during "adventure dives", which may include a diver's first experience using a dry suit, while the standard for the PADI Dry Suit Diver course requires not only direct supervision of the student by the instructor, during open water dives, but also that open water dives must be preceded by a theory class, and a confined water skills training session, both of which must be satisfactorily completed before venturing into open water.

A PADI Open Water Instructor can be registered as a specialty instructor for several specialties, without demonstrating competence to teach or even perform those specialties, including Dry Suit Diver, which requires a significant skill set and understanding of the principles to be done safely.

=== Workplace programs ===
PADI offers a specialty program called Public Safety Diver for divers who are either employed in or serve as volunteers in the public safety diving sector principally within the United States. This certification is not recognised in some countries which have national standards for occupational diving qualifications and require registration with a national body.

=== First aid programs ===
PADI, via its subsidiary, Emergency First Response, Corp, distributes the following programs in cardiopulmonary resuscitation (CPR) and first aid for both divers and non-divers: These may not be recognised by health and safety authorities in some jurisdictions where workplace first aid certification must be through a nationally or state accredited training provider.

- Primary Care (CPR)
- Secondary Care (First Aid)
- Care for Children
- Region-specific workplaces courses for countries including Australia, the United Kingdom and the United States.

== Accreditation and memberships ==
PADI courses are recognized, recommended and cited by the institutions and organizations listed below for both recreational diving and vocational training.

PADI courses are recommended for college credit in the US by ACE. PADI is a member of the United States Recreational Scuba Training Council (RSTC).

Recognition's and equivalencies has been established between PADI and Confédération Mondiale des Activités Subaquatiques, the Colombian Navy, and Fédération Française d'Études et de Sports Sous-Marins (FFESSM). PADI is also a registered training organisation in Australia. As of 2012, PADI rescue diver and divemaster programs are included on the United Kingdom's Health and Safety Executive list of approved diving qualifications.

Those PADI courses aligning with standards published by the International Organization for Standardization (ISO) for 'Recreational diving services' were audited by the European Underwater Federation (EUF) Certification Body in 2004 and 2009, and were certified at both times as complying with these standards. The relevant certifications may include:

- EN 14153-1 / ISO 24801-1 - Part 1: Level 1 "Supervised Diver" (PADI equivalent – Scuba Diver)
- EN 14153-2 / ISO 24801-2 - Part 2: Level 2 "Autonomous Diver" (PADI equivalent – Open Water Diver)
- EN 14153-3 / ISO 24801-3 - Part 3: Level 3 "Dive Leader" (PADI equivalent – Divemaster)
- EN 14413-1 / ISO 24802-1 - Part 1: Level 1 Instructor (PADI equivalent – Assistant Instructor)
- EN 14413-2 / ISO 24802-2 - Part 2: Level 2 Instructor (PADI equivalent – Open Water Scuba Instructor)
- ISO 11107 Enriched air nitrox (EAN) diving (PADI equivalent – Enriched Air Diver)
- ISO 11121 introductory training programs to scuba diving. (PADI equivalent – Discover Scuba Diving)

Most PADI training programs are not directly covered by ISO standards.

PADI is a member of the following member councils of the World Recreational Scuba Training Council – the RSTC Canada, the RSTC Europe and the C-Card Council (Japan).

== Business strategy ==
PADI is recognised as the largest recreational diver training agency with the largest rate of issue of diver certification, and the largest membership of professional instructors and dive leaders in recreational diving. They are a for-profit organization focused on efficiency of training of the largest number of customers.

To gain membership of PADI, a person must agree to follow PADI training standards, be reviewed by PADI for quality assurance, sign the membership agreement and pay the annual membership dues, for which they are allowed to buy PADI course materials, resell them to their customers, and use the PADI trademarks and logos for marketing their services.

=== Marketing ===
PADI offers dive shops and training centers the opportunity to affiliate with the PADI brand by becoming a member of the PADI Retailer and Resort Association (PADI RRA) which is a worldwide group of dive shops and resorts committed to selling PADI products and promoting the PADI diving and marketing philosophy. PADI Worldwide, Inc. contracts directly with member dive shops to join the RRA, and PADI Americas, Inc. administers the RRA in the United States.

A PADI 5 Star Dive Center is a dive center that exclusively offers PADI training and certification, has been a PADI dive center for at least 12 months, with no verified violations of PADI quality assurance over that period and no open QA investigations, and have been awarded all three of PADI's dive center recognition awards (the criteria for which do not appear to be publicly available). The center must also advertise to recruit and retain customers. The center must have provided at least one course each of Advanced Open Water Diver, PADI Rescue Diver, and Divemaster or Assistant Instructor, in the previous year, and provide diving activities or travel apart from training. There is no mention or guarantee of better quality service compared to any other dive center.

A PADI Elite Instructor is a PADI instructor with no verified QA violations who certifies more than a specified number of divers per year.

== Specialty training ==
=== Adaptive Support Diver ===
Adaptive Support Diver is a course for divers who want to support a dive buddy with a physical or mental barrier to full independence as a recreational diver, and must rely on some support from one or more support divers for acceptable safety. The training is targeted on increasing the support diver's awareness of the challenged diver's abilities and limitations, and how to effectively assist in their management. Prerequisites are Open Water Diver, in date Emergency First Response primary and secondary care, and recommended PADI Peak Performance Buoyancy. The course covers diving with people with reduced mobility and supporting divers who are blind or have less obvious disabilities, and focuses on what disabled people can do, to help the support diver understand the use of adaptive techniques.

== Affiliates and sponsorships ==
Since 2009, PADI and the Boy Scouts of America (BSA) have maintained a mutual support partnership. In Canada, PADI sponsors the Scouts Canada Scuba Program. Affiliates include:

- Emergency First Response provides CPR and First Aid training both for the lay person and in the workplace.
- Current Publishing Corporation develops marine science programs for high school and upper level educational facilities.
- Diving Science and Technology Corporation (DSAT) is the development arm for the Recreational Dive Planner and PADI's Tec-Rec program.

=== Citations in professional literature ===
PADI's instructional methodology is cited in EDUCAUSE's 2012 book, Game Changers: Education and Information Technologies regarding badges as "a symbol or indicator of an accomplishment, skill, quality, or interest. From the Boy and Girl Scouts to PADI diving instruction, to the more recently popular geolocation game Foursquare, badges have been successfully used to set goals, motivate behaviors, represent achievements, and communicate success in many contexts."

PADI's environmental emphasis is cited in the 2007 book, New Frontiers in Marine Tourism, in its section, Dive Tourism, Sustainable Tourism and Social Responsibility: A Growing Agenda – Environmental management and education: the case of PADI, (Chapter Seven). "PADI, as well as other diver certification organisations and individual businesses, has put significant resources into conservation and developed public awareness programs".

New Frontiers in Marine Tourism also cites in the section entitled Student Scholarships and Social Responsibility: A Growing Agenda for PADI, that "The PADI Scholarship program ... is a good example of the way that various disparate parts of an industry, each with limited resources, can pool their efforts to help more people from developing countries to enter the diving profession... PADI recognizes that good relations with the involvement of local people is essential both to business development and to environmental protection. The scholarship scheme makes entry into the dive business more possible for some students who have the backing of their dive center."

== See also ==
- List of diver certification organizations
