= Ádám Korányi =

Hungarian and American mathematician

- Born: July 13, 1932; Szeged, Hungary
- Citizenship: United States
- Education: University of Chicago
- Known for: Complex analysis
- Scientific career
- Fields: Mathematics
- Workplaces: Lehman College; CUNY Graduate Center
- Thesis: "Operator Theoretic Methods Applied to Interpolation Problems for Functions of Several Complex Variables" (1959)
- Doctoral advisor: Marshall Stone
- Doctoral students: Howard L. Resnikoff

Ádám Korányi (born July 13, 1932, in Szeged) is a Hungarian and American mathematician. He is a Distinguished Professor of Mathematics and Computer Science at Lehman College and the Graduate Center of the City University of New York. His research interests include complex analysis, harmonic analysis, and quasiconformal mappings.

== Life and career ==
Korányi earned his doctorate in 1959 from the University of Chicago under the supervision of Marshall Stone. He has been an external member of the Hungarian Academy of Sciences since 2001.

Korányi advised 7 doctoral students, including Howard L. Resnikoff.

== Selected publications ==
- Korányi, Adam (1969). "Harmonic functions on Hermitian hyperbolic space". Transactions of the American Mathematical Society. 135: 507–516. doi:10.1090/S0002-9947-1969-0277747-0. MR 0277747.
- Korányi, Adam (1969). "Boundary behavior of Poisson integrals on symmetric spaces". Transactions of the American Mathematical Society. 140: 393–409. doi:10.1090/S0002-9947-1969-0245826-X. MR 0245826.
- Korányi, Adam; Misra, Gadadhar (2009). "Multiplicity-free homogeneous operators in the Cowen-Douglas class". Perspectives in mathematical sciences. II. Statistical Science and Interdisciplinary Research. Vol. 8. World Scientific Publishing, Hackensack, NJ. pp. 83–101. arXiv:0901.0794. doi:10.1142/9789814273657_0005. ISBN 978-981-4273-64-0. MR 2581752. S2CID 17312200.
- Korányi, Adam; Misra, Gadadhar (2011). "A classification of homogeneous operators in the Cowen-Douglas class". Advances in Mathematics. 226 (6): 5338–5360. arXiv:0901.1233. doi:10.1016/j.aim.2011.01.012. MR 2775904.
