= Diving Science and Technology =

PADI affiliate and developer of recreational decompression planning tools

- Abbreviation: DSAT
- Formation: November 1986
- Legal status: active (July 2014)
- Headquarters: Rancho Santa Margarita, California, United States
- Location: 30151 Tomas St.
- Parent organization: PADI Worldwide Corp.

Diving Science and Technology (or DSAT) is a corporate affiliate of the Professional Association of Diving Instructors (PADI) and the developer of the Recreational Dive Planner. DSAT has held scientific workshops for diver safety and education.

== See also ==
- Professional Association of Diving Instructors (PADI) – Recreational diver training and certification agency
