= PADI Aware =

International environmental nonprofit organization

PADI Aware Foundation
- Formation: 1989
- Type: NGO
- Legal status: not for profit incorporation in Australia, UK and United States
- Headquarters: Rancho Santa Margarita, California, US; Bristol, United Kingdom; Sydney
- Region served: Global
- Chairman: Drew Richardson
- Global Director: Danna Moore
- Parent organization: PADI
- Budget: $1.4 million
- Staff: 8 FT Staff
- Website: padi.com/aware
- Formerly called: Project Aware Foundation

The PADI Aware Foundation is an environmental nonprofit organization with three registered charities in the United Kingdom, United States, and Australia. Their mission is to drive local initiatives contributing to global ocean conservation efforts, through engagement with the international community of professional and recreational scuba divers via the Professional Association of Diving Instructors (PADI).

== Background ==
In 1989, the Professional Association of Diving Instructors (PADI) established the Project Aware Foundation as a commitment to ocean protection. In 1992, Project Aware Foundation became a registered nonprofit organization with an environmental mission and purpose. In 2021, Project Aware evolved into PADI Aware Foundation, formally aligning with PADI on a joint conservation plan to achieve critical ocean conservation goals.

== Activities ==
PADI Aware Foundation manages four programs through public funding: marine debris, shark protection, community grants and Marine Protected Areas (MPAs). These programs provide tools and resources to engage the public and scuba divers in activities such as citizen science, education, advocacy (letter writing campaigns, petitions and photo campaigns) to advance more significant action on the key threats facing the ocean.

In 2011, the organization announced a focus on the removal of marine debris, encouraging volunteer divers from around the world to actively remove trash from the seafloor. This program established the organization's flagship citizen science program, Dive Against Debris, and has created the largest underwater citizen science program and movement on the planet with over 100,000 divers reporting from 117 countries. In 2020, PADI AWARE Foundation published the data analyzing coastal debris across land and seafloor habitat, in collaboration with Ocean Conservancy, in Science Direct.

The protection of sharks and rays, critical species to shark tourism, is a core policy focus of the organization. In 2021, the Foundation rallied divers to advocate for protections for Mako sharks. Alongside shark partners and allies, the Foundation pressured governments to adopt a ban on the catching of vulnerable species.

In 2021, PADI Aware Foundation committed to the PADI Blueprint for Ocean Action, joining the United Nations' universal call for a Decade of Action to achieve the Sustainable Development Goals (SDGs), specifically supporting the implementation of SDG14 – Life Below Water. To advance this commitment, the organization launched the PADI AWARE Community Grant Program and the Adopt the Blue program.

PADI Aware engages with dive leaders and ocean advocates via citizen science initiatives, an online eco-network, an interactive conservation map, conservation dive courses, letter-writing campaigns, and joining environmental NGO networks to give collective support to member organizations' lobbying efforts.
