= Recreational Dive Planner =

Decompression table for divers

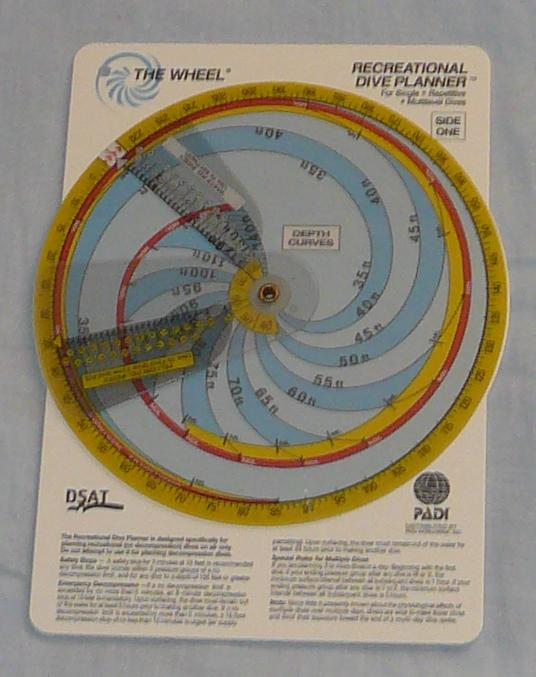
The PADI recreational dive planner, in "Wheel" format.

The Recreational Dive Planner (or RDP) is a decompression table in which no-stop time underwater is calculated. The RDP was developed by DSAT and was the first dive table developed exclusively for no-stop recreational diving. There are four types of RDPs: the original table version first introduced in 1988 along with a circular slide rule version called The Wheel, followed by the eRDP, an electronic version introduced in 2005 and the eRDPML, an electronic multi-level version introduced in 2008.

RDPs are almost always used in conjunction with dive log books to record and monitor pressure depth and residual nitrogen levels.

The low price and convenience of many modern dive computers mean that many recreational divers only use tables such as the RDP for a short time during training before moving on to use a diving computer. Dive computers are also used as they calculate no-decompression limits based on the whole dive whereas the RDP is much more conservative and assumes a square profile dive where the diver spends the entire dive at one depth. Although this is much more conservative, dive computers provide much more dive time and therefore are the more popular option with most divers.
