= Aware, Inc. =

American software company

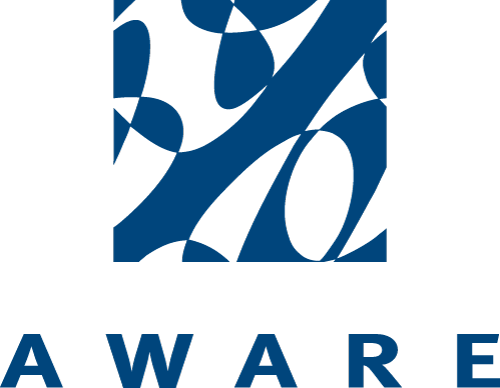

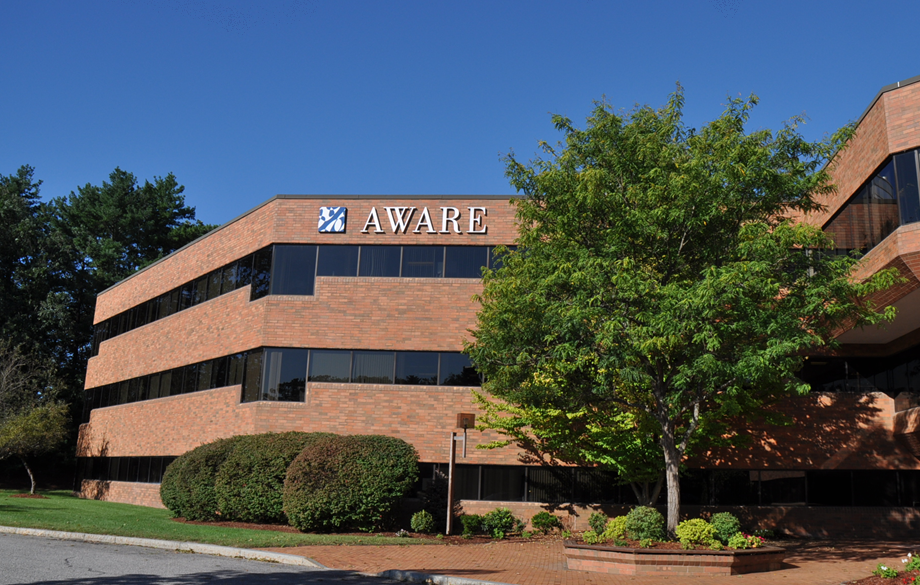
- Headquarters in Bedford, Massachusetts
- Type: Public
- Traded as: Nasdaq: AWRE; Russell Microcap Index component
- Industry: Biometrics; Software
- Founded: 1986; 40 years ago, in Cambridge, Massachusetts, US
- Headquarters: Burlington, Massachusetts, US
- Key people: Ajay Amlani (CEO); Brian Krause (CRO); Mohamed Lazzouni (CTO)
- Website: aware.com

Aware, Inc. is a biometrics software and services company based near Boston, Massachusetts.

== History ==
Aware was incorporated in 1986 in Cambridge, Massachusetts at which time it was envisioned by its founders as a "mathematical engineering company".

Aware went public in 1996 to commercialize its DSL products and intellectual property, at which time it also had an established business supplying biometrics software for law enforcement applications.

Between 2009 and 2012, Aware divested several assets unrelated to its current business.

As of 2019, Aware is focused exclusively on providing biometrics software and services. Its products apply fingerprint recognition, face recognition, iris recognition, and speaker recognition for applications including multi-factor authentication and biometric identification.
