= Environmental impact of recreational diving =

Effects of scuba diving on the underwater environment

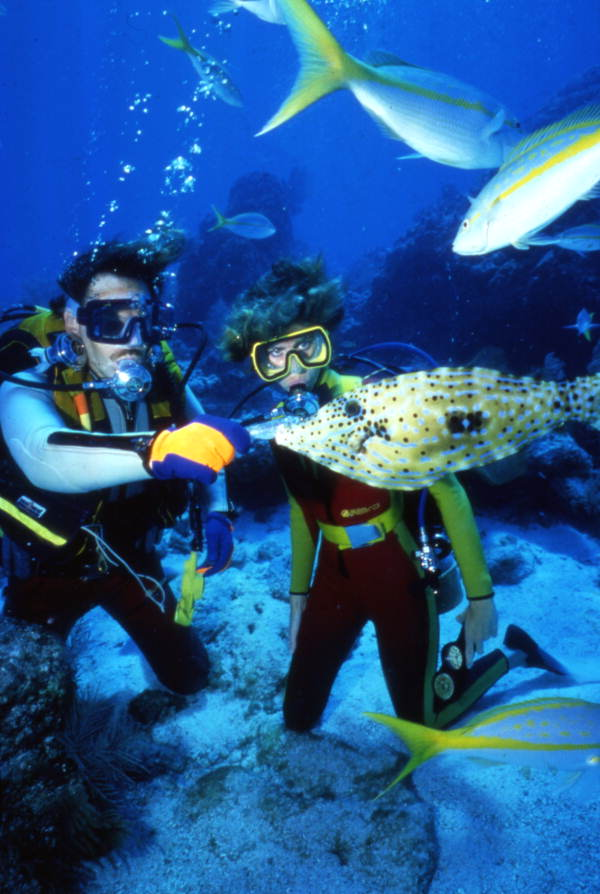
Scuba divers kneeling on the bottom of the coral reef while feeding a filefish at John Pennekamp Coral Reef State Park- Key Largo, Florida

The environmental impact of recreational diving is the effects of recreational scuba diving on the underwater environment, which is largely the effects of diving tourism on the marine environment. It is not uncommon for highly trafficked dive destinations to have more adverse effects with visible signs of diving's negative impacts due in large part to divers who have not been trained to sufficient competence in the skills required for the local environment, an inadequate pre-dive orientation, or lack of a basic understanding of biodiversity and the delicate balance of aquatic ecosystems. There may also be indirect positive effects as the environment is recognised by the local communities to be worth more in good condition than degraded by inappropriate use, and conservation efforts get support from dive communities who promote environmental awareness, and teach low impact diving and the importance of respecting marine life. There are also global coral reef monitoring networks in place which include local volunteer divers assisting in the collection of data for scientific monitoring of coral reef systems, which may eventually have a net positive impact on the environment.

During the 20th century recreational scuba diving was considered to have generally low environmental impact, and was consequently one of the activities permitted in most marine protected areas. Since the 1970s diving has changed from an elite activity to a more accessible recreation, marketed to a very wide demographic. To some extent better equipment has been substituted for more rigorous training, and the reduction in perceived risk has shortened minimum training requirements by several training agencies. Training has concentrated on an acceptable risk to the diver, and paid less attention to the environment. The increase in the popularity of diving and in tourist access to sensitive ecological systems has led to the recognition that the activity can have significant environmental consequences.

Scuba diving has grown in popularity during the 21st century, as is shown by the number of certifications issued worldwide, which has increased to about 23 million by 2016 at about one million per year. Scuba diving tourism is a growth industry, and it is necessary to consider environmental sustainability, as the expanding impact of divers can adversely affect the marine environment in several ways. The impact also depends on the specific environment; tropical coral reefs are more easily damaged by poor diving skills than some temperate reefs, where the environment is more robust and resilient due to rougher normal sea conditions and fewer fragile, slow-growing organisms. The same pleasant sea conditions that allow development of relatively delicate and highly diverse ecologies also attract the greatest number of tourists, including divers who dive infrequently, exclusively on vacation, and never fully develop the skills to dive in an environmentally friendly way. Various strategies for environmental management are being tested, in an attempt to achieve a sustainable balance between conservation and commercial exploitation.

Active avoidance of benthos contact requires appropriate motivation, and successful avoidance requires appropriate competence. Low impact diving training has been shown to be effective in reducing diver contact in suitably motivated divers. Experience appears to be the most important factor in explaining divers' underwater behaviour, followed by their attitude towards diving and the environment, and personality type.

== Affected environments ==
All underwater environments frequented by recreational divers are potentially affected, but the impact is observed to be greater where there are large numbers of dives or the environment has fragile slow-growing organisms or delicate structures. The more obvious examples are tropical coral reefs and flooded caves with fragile speleothems. Relatively large numbers of studies have been done on tropical coral reefs as the pressure on them has been perceived to be highest. Coral reefs are to some extent self-repairing, and also sustain damage from non-anthropogenic causes, so an acceptable level of continuous diver induced degradation is theoretically possible, which would be matched by the natural recovery rate. Underwater speleothems, once broken, do not regenerate at all while the cave remains flooded, and remain broken forever, if human timespans are considered. Underwater cultural heritage in the form of historically important wrecks and archaeological sites are also susceptible to irreversible damage, but they are usually constantly deteriorating in any case. Diver impact mainly accelerates the inevitable.

Subtropical, temperate, and polar marine reef environments vary considerably in their ability to recover from damage, and have historically been considered less impacted by diving, consequently fewer studies are available on diver damage, reef recovery and sustainable carrying capacity. These areas are emerging as diving destinations, as is research on diver impact on their environments.

== Types of impact ==
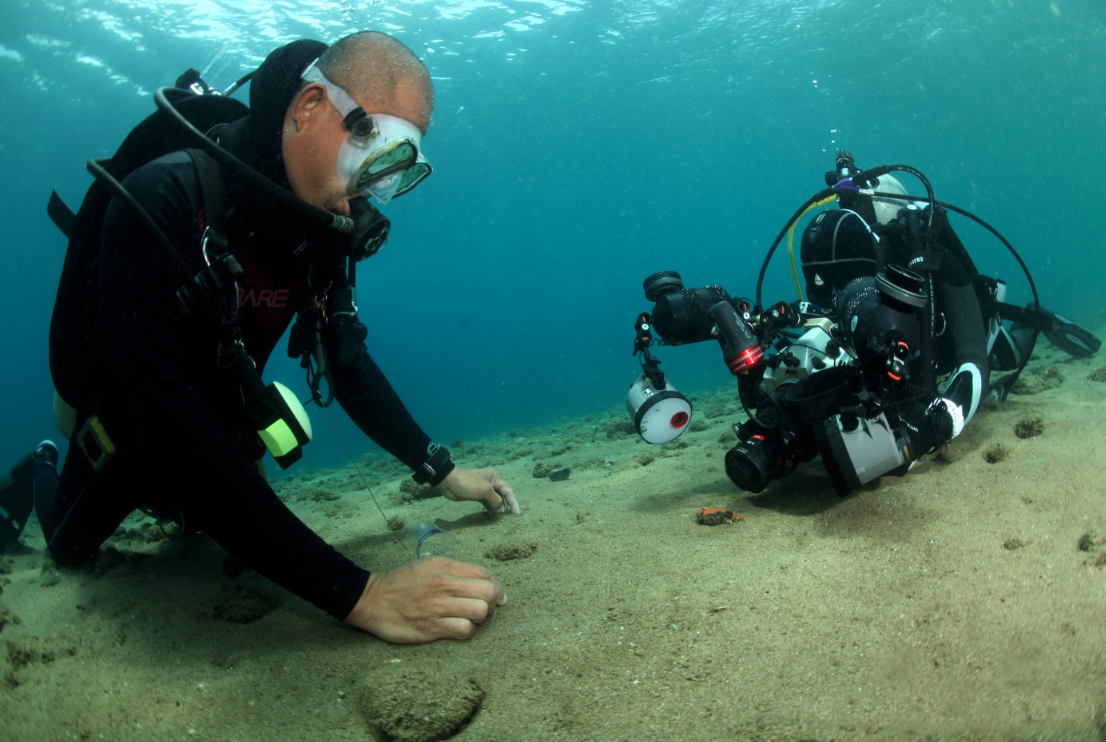
Underwater macro photographer resting on the bottom while composing a photo

Research on the effects of divers on tropical coral reefs has shown reduced coral cover on heavily dived sites and a change in coral structure, with more resilient corals becoming dominant and a loss of species diversity over time. These reefs may be less resilient to other stressors like disease outbreaks and severe weather damage.

There is persuasive evidence that reefs can be damaged and the amenity value of dive sites compromised by badly planned or over-intensive tourist use. Marine tourism affects reef communities directly through disturbance such as structural damage to corals, boats grounding on reefs and damage by anchors, and indirectly through alteration of water quality by nutrient enrichment and pollution by toxic substances, waste water and increased turbidity. The level of degradation depends on the intensity, frequency, time and type of use and the specific environment.

Diver impact damage to corals includes skeletal breakage of branching species, tissue abrasion, possibly leading to infection by coral diseases, and an overall reduction of hard coral coverage on reefs. Diving related activities may also reduce the reef's resilience to reef stressors like climate change and bleaching events.

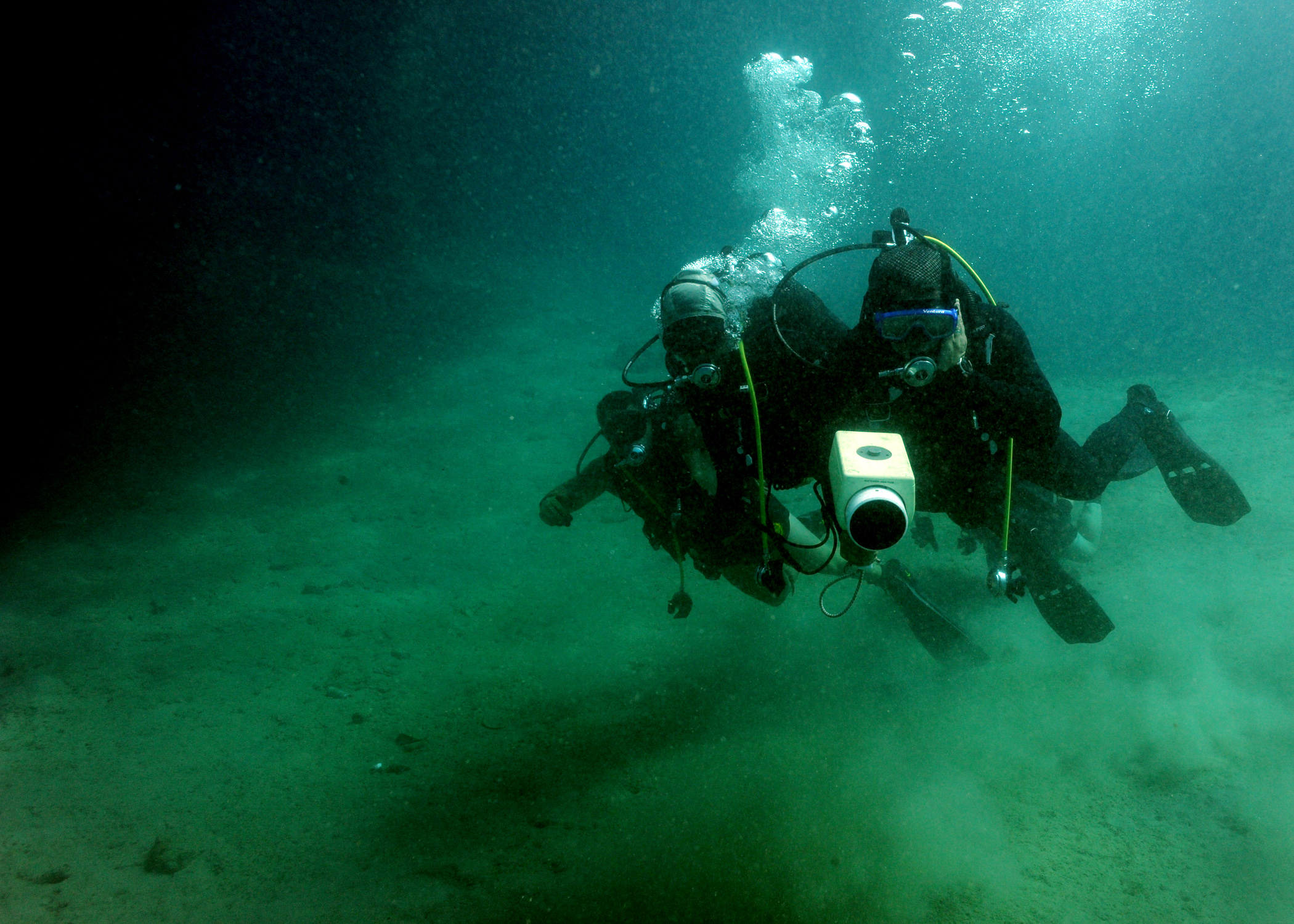
Diver kicking up the sand with wash from the fins

In some frequently dived tropical coral reef sites recreational divers have caused negative ecological impacts by inadvertent impacts with live corals causing physical damage at a rate faster than compensated for by natural recovery. The long term result is reef degradation. One of the common challenges for local policy and management is maximising tourism benefits while also reducing environmental degradation to long-term sustainable levels.

In the soft sediment bottomed "muck diving" environment, it was observed that photography causes greater environmental disturbances than effects caused by diving experience, certification level, gender or age. Divers came into contact with the substrate more often on soft sediment than on coral reefs, but environmental damage was not greater. Divers tend to touch animals more frequently when observing or photographing cryptobenthic fauna, and spent up to five times longer in interactions when using dSLR-cameras. Long-term impacts of this behaviour on cryptobenthic fauna and soft sediment habitats are unknown.

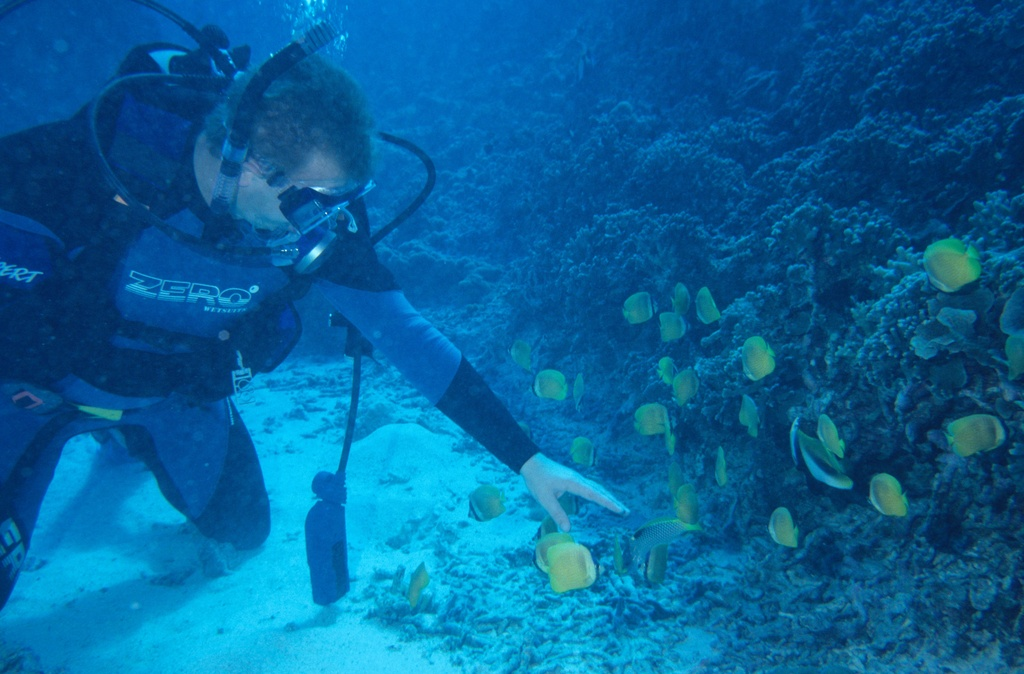
Diver kneeling on the sand in the Comores, note the dangling instrument combo

The impacts of photographer behaviour and photographic flashes on a small sample of benthic fish species was investigated. The study showed negligible effects beyond those caused by human presence alone. Flash photography caused no discernible ocular changes in seahorses and feeding success was not affected. Physical handling of animals produced strong stress responses.

Diver impact on subtropical, and particularly temperate reefs, is less researched than tropical reefs. The perception is that these reefs are less vulnerable than tropical reefs and the sessile species are less exposed to diver impact. Research in the Mediterranean in Spain indicates that sessile organisms with fragile and brittle calcareous or corneous skeletons are not resilient to frequent disturbances by divers.

Diver contact with the bottom is also prevalent on temperate reefs, in freshwater environments, and in caves. One of the main forms mentioned is fin contact with the bottom sediment, raising particulate material to into the water column and degrading visibility, but disturbance of sediment and delicate benthic biofilms by fin wash without direct contact is also a concern.

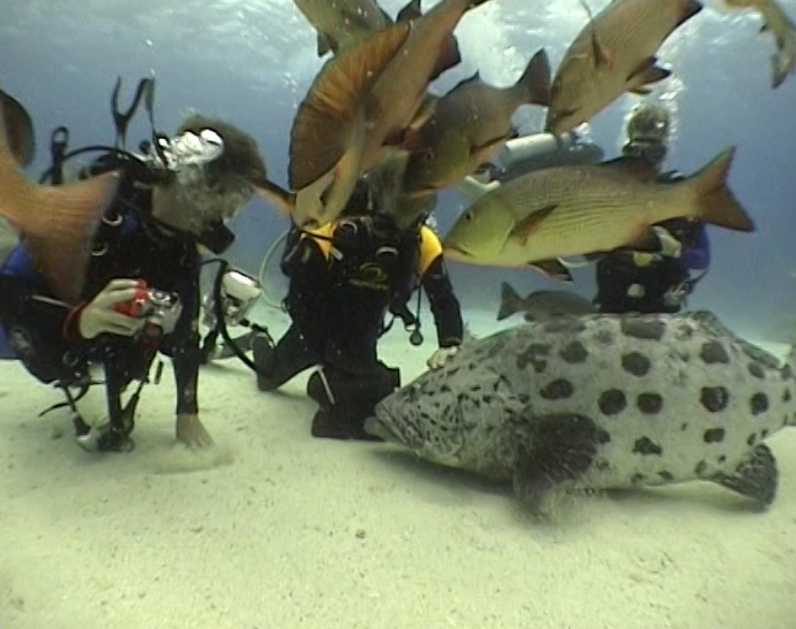
Diver feeding fish at Cod Hole

The impact of recreational scuba diving on recreational dive values and the cultural heritage of shipwrecks has been found to comprise four basic types:

- The removal of artifacts and associated disturbance to wreck sites,
- Direct contact with wrecks and the benthic biota living on them by divers and their equipment,
- Exhaled air bubbles trapped inside the wreckage,
- Impact damage by anchors of dive boats, considered by some researchers to be the most damaging form of impact associated with recreational wreck diving. Shot line weights can also damage relatively fragile wreckage by impact and snagging, but usually to a lesser extent as the shot is generally lighter than an anchor or and there is less lateral load on it. This type of damage can be avoided completely by installing permanent moorings at frequently dived wrecks.

Gender distribution of diver impact on reefs is inconclusive, different studies have produced contradictory findings.

== Reasons for impact ==
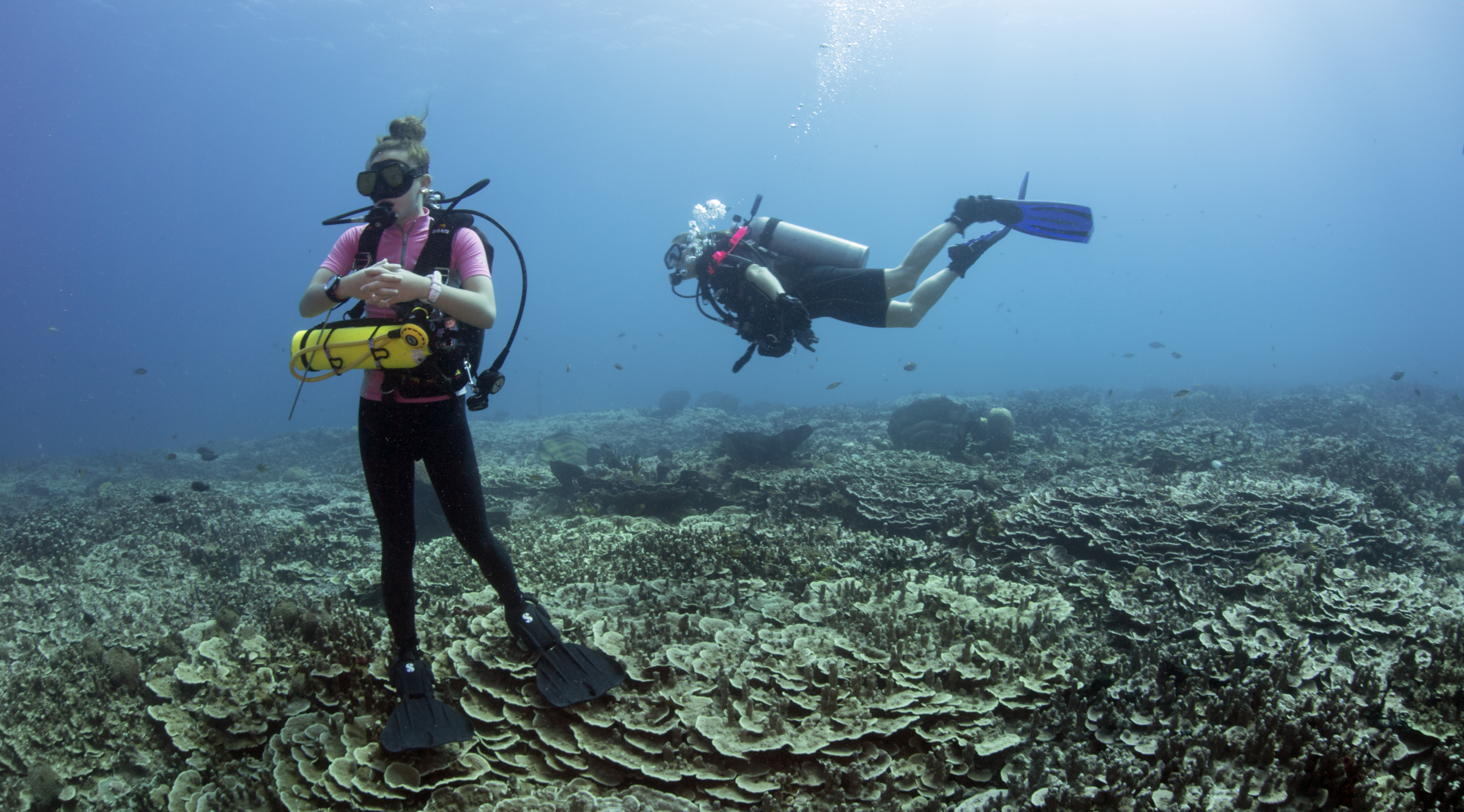
Diver with negative buoyancy standing on coral structures on Guam

Repetitive contact by divers and their equipment on the benthos is the general mechanism of reef degradation by recreational divers. Factors correlating with frequency of reef contact were found to be:

- Interval since the previous dive – A longer interval correlates with skill loss and poorer buoyancy control and trim.
- Experience in terms of number of dives to date – A lower number of dives correlates with poorer buoyancy control and trim.
- Location of certification training – Training in easy conditions does not develop more advanced skills, but experience in ecologically similar environments produces some familiarity with delicate and fragile organisms.
- Awareness of marine park zoning
- Use of photographic equipment - photographers are more likely to contact the reef while their attention is focused on taking a photo.
- Depth of the dive – divers were observed to make fewer contacts at greater depth. The reasons are not clear, but may be related to less water movement or less buoyancy variation with depth.
- Large groups of divers gathering at the beginning of a dive before they establish neutral buoyancy A considerably higher rate of impacts has been observed during the initial phase of dives and has been attributed to divers taking some time to get their buoyancy correct and to get themselves orientated, particularly when entry points are directly over shallow coral formations, or the divers are unfamiliar with the environment.

Diver trimmed head up produces downwash vortices while finning which lift bottom sediment.

Observations that experience does not predict frequency of impacts is not necessarily incompatible with findings that practical training reduces frequency of impacts, as experience is not always an indicator of competence.

Fin impacts have been identified as contributing the most to damage to reef biota; erect and branching hard corals are the most sensitive taxon to contact damage on tropical reefs, and the severity of damage is influenced by habitat complexity. This indicates that better diver trim, buoyancy and finning techniques, situational awareness of position relative to the reef, and awareness of the damage done by contact with corals in habitats where close proximity of fins to sensitive organisms is likely, are priorities for reducing damage. Several studies have found that damage to coral reefs by divers can be minimized by modifying the behavior of those divers. Training in low impact diving skills appears to significantly reduce contact with the benthos in divers of all certification and experience levels. This result can be extrapolated to other diving environments as a method to protect the environment and help to make recreational scuba diving more ecologically sustainable, and may enhance the diving experience.

There appears to be little correlation between site topography and coral damage, but damage is related to coral morphology and structural strength. Most damage is to branching species which are inherently weaker against bending loads.

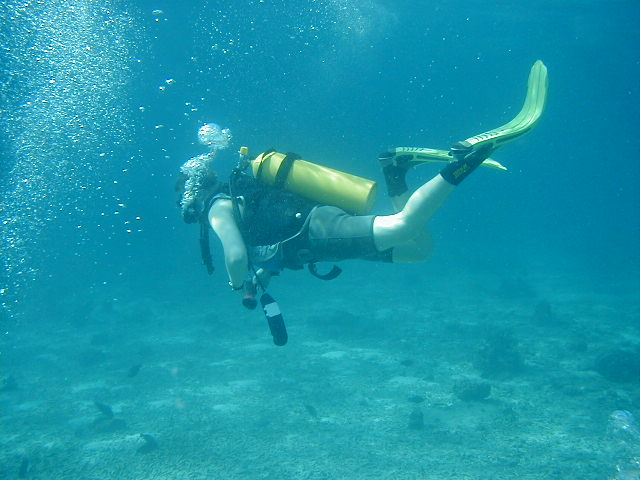
Diver with dangling instrument console, which could impact the bottom or even get snagged on a reef

Several studies have found the main reason for contact by inexperienced divers to be poor buoyancy control. Studies on recreational divers on tropical coral reefs have shown that the rate of contact between diver and environment varies significantly between divers who are able to maintain neutral buoyancy and those who are deficient in the skill, with divers who do not maintain neutral buoyancy contacting the reef more often. Briefing divers on the effects of contact with the reef reduced contact in divers with good buoyancy skills, but not in divers who lacked those skills. The problem appears to be one of competence. Without the necessary competence, divers are unable to modify their behaviour appropriately, and cannot produce the skills merely by being made aware of their necessity. The solution to reducing reef contact is in requiring the diver to have the skill before allowing them to dive in the environment where it is needed.

There is evidence that the ability of dive guides to positively influence diver behaviour relating to reef contact is less for larger groups of divers, but the implementation of programmes which focus on dive industry operations can contribute to the reduction of anthropogenic reef damage.

Some MPAs in the Mediterranean have prohibited scuba diving completely, or have restricted it to reefs near the boundaries of the MPA. Others have established diving trails which keep divers away from vulnerable areas. Another conservation strategy identified potentially vulnerable species and based the determination of sustainable numbers of visitors on this.

=== Sociopsychological factors ===
A 2012 study by Ong and Musa on recreational divers in Malaysia showed that experience was the most important factor in explaining divers' underwater behaviour, followed by the attitude towards diving and personality type, and that attitude towards the environment partially mediates the influence of experience on underwater behaviour, but Scott-Ireton (2008) found that an awareness of how and why the environment should be protected has more effect than skill competence for motivating divers to conserve their surroundings. Active avoidance of reef contact requires appropriate motivation, and successful avoidance requires appropriate competence.

== Strategies for reducing diver impact ==
- Correct weighting is a prerequisite for good buoyancy control.
- Good buoyancy control is necessary (but not sufficient) for sustained level trim.
- Level trim brings fins higher above the benthos on most reefs with consequent lower frequency of direct contact and of disturbed sediments.
- Reduction and clipping off of dangling equipment reduces the risk of low-hanging items contacting reef when in close proximity.
- Awareness of proximity to the surroundings allows avoidance of movements which will result in reef contact, particularly high impact contact.
- Appropriate finning technique should reduce risk of reef impact, and can be selected to suit lateral or vertical proximity. The vertical fin motion in flutter kicks is more likely to impact reef below the diver, and lateral movement of frog kicks is more likely to impact a wall.
- Understanding the ecological effects of reef contact and knowledge of the vulnerabilities of local species allows avoidance of particularly vulnerable organisms, and is likely to motivate ecologically responsible divers to apply more effort to avoiding contacts with those organisms.
- Adjusting proximity to suit sea conditions – clearance between diver and benthos can be adjusted to allow acceptable risk of contact for variations in surge and current.

=== Diver education ===
Entry-level diver training is necessarily focused on diver safety. The training programmes are usually as short as the standards allow, and do not provide more than a basic mention of diver impact on the underwater environment and methods to minimise that impact. There is seldom any actual skill training for anything beyond survival skills and basic buoyancy control. Divers are issued certification for minimum compliance with skills and knowledge essential to their safety, and in some cases may not even meet those standards on certification. The information provided in the training manuals regarding diver ecological impact is not safety critical and consequently the relevant skills and knowledge may not be evaluated or taken into consideration when assessing competence, even when it is sufficient in coverage to be potentially useful. As most recreational divers never take part in further training, and may only dive sporadically, they may lose skills faster than they develop them, and refresher courses to relearn basic safety skills are common. Basic entry-level diver training cannot be a reliable means of ensuring low impact diving, particularly in regions differing significantly from those in which initial training is done. The amount and quality of coverage of information in entry-level training manuals on environmental impact by divers also varies significantly between training providers.

Several researchers have found evidence to indicate that much of the damage to the underwater environment could be avoided by modifying the behaviour of divers by a combination of an education session followed by in-water demonstration, but short pre-dive briefings alone have little effect on contact rates.

Camp and Fraser, 2012, found that divers who had taken part in environmental conservation courses contacted the reef as often as those who did not, but conservation education provided in a dive briefing reduced contacts with the reef, and the depth of conservation education is relevant to its effectiveness. Diver familiarity with the local environment was also mentioned as having an effect on reducing impact frequency.

There are a variety of scuba diving programs that provide instruction into not only effective techniques and appropriate equipment, but also a focus on environmental conservation, particularly preservation of coral reefs. For instance, in the Florida Keys, there are companies which provide education for advanced open-water divers to learn more about the impact of the recreational sport on ocean wildlife, as well as have affiliations with organizations such as the Blue Star Dive Center and the Coral Restoration Foundation. These programs emphasize the importance of divers maintaining sufficient distance between themselves and sea creatures to minimize contamination and preserve the health of the underwater world.

=== Low impact diving training ===
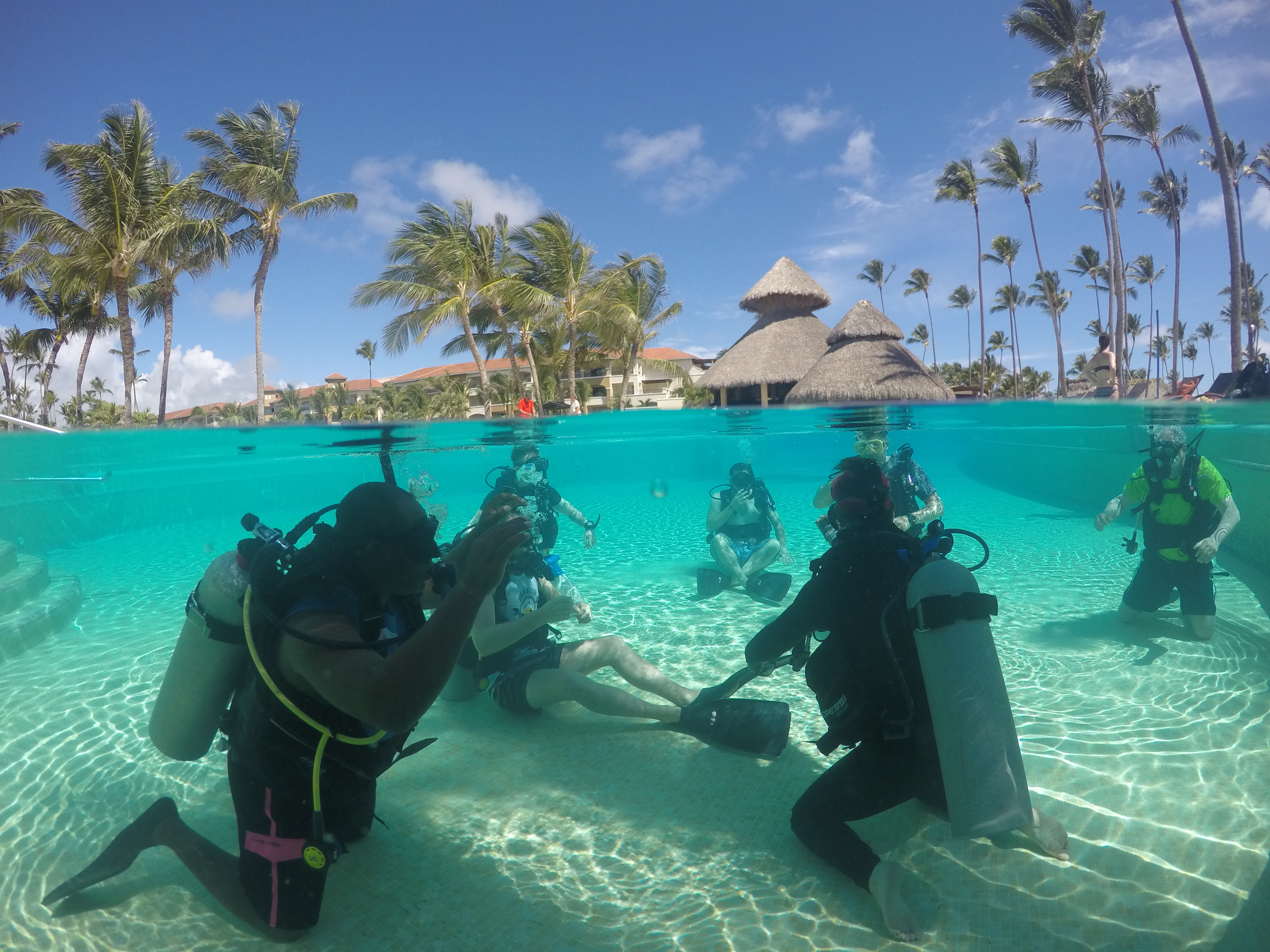
Scuba training should be done where it has no direct impact on the environment if possible

Diamond Reef "rollercoaster" course layout for low impact skills training and evaluation

Low impact diving training has been shown to be effective in reducing diver contact.

In 1989, Buoyancy Training Systems International, a company based in Seattle, Washington, became the first organization in the world to create an internationally uniform, training and objective underwater test of skill specifically designed to reduce diver impact upon the marine environment. The curriculum and mobile practice venue, now known as the Diamond Reef System, uses standardised portable reef simulation structures called 'Diamond Reef Hover Stations' to raise the proficiency and awareness of divers at all stages of diver training including tropical resort acclimation dives. This program remains in use by dive operators world-wide and the U.S. Environmental Protection Agency.

The specific PADI Low Impact Diver training program takes 2 days and appears to be effective for a large range of pre-existing skill and certification levels. Similar training from other providers should have similar results. Many of the skills are included in technical diver training, particularly cave and wreck diving, where they are also important for safety.

While competence, which is directly associated with training and experience, is fundamentally necessary for low impact diving, attitude towards the environment and personality type appear to influence whether and how the diver applies their competence to moderating ecological impact.

== Strategies for sustainable use management ==
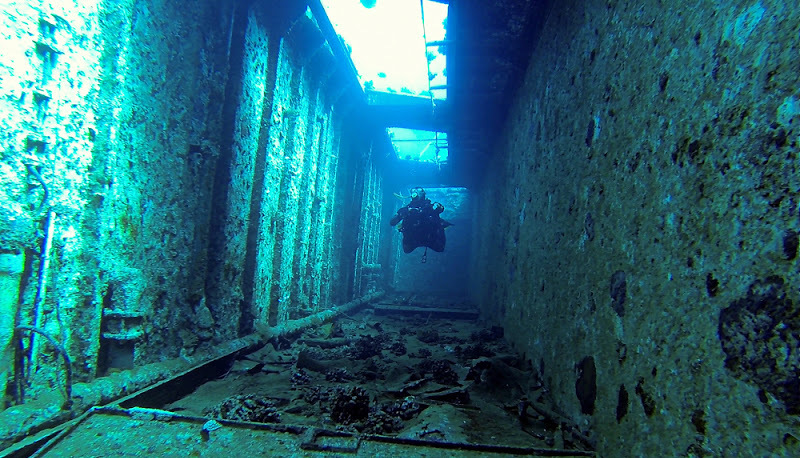
Wreck diver keeping clear of the wreckage while swimming through an fairly confined space

Several methodologies have been developed with the intention of minimising the environmental impact of divers on coral reefs

- Carrying capacity approach, where the number of divers is restricted. This also limits tourism income from the region. Sustainable diver carrying capacity is influenced by factors which vary between sites. These include coral morphology, presence of vulnerable species, environmental awareness and competence of the divers, presence of other stressors, size of the dive site, reef topography, and sea conditions. Continuous adjustment may be necessary to account for changes, unknowns and inaccurate models.
- Limits of acceptable change. This model uses quantitative limits on change defined in specific management objectives for a site using an established baseline. It does not handle natural variation well if this is unknown, and cannot distinguish between causes of change, some of which may be unrelated to diving. In some cases an undisturbed baseline may not be available.
- Percentile approach: This method considers a need for multiple reference sites and establishes trigger values quickly by comparing the extent of coral damage between dived sites and similar non-dived control sites. The trigger for management action is if the median abundance of damage to coral equals or exceeds the 80th percentile of damage at the reference sites. Limitations to this system include sensitivity to initial conditions - it does not work well if the reference sites are already significantly degraded, and permanent moorings tend to concentrate damage to the region near the mooring, it may pick up false positives from damage from non-diver causes, and it is sensitive to conditions at the control sites.
- Restricting recreational divers to delimited locations, which usually concentrates divers and damage along diving trails. This creates paths of degraded reef through the more pristine areas, and will cause customer dissatisfaction as the trail degrades further.
- Regulating the type of diving equipment allowed, generally accessories which are thought to increase reef contacts, such as gloves and cameras. These restrictions are understandably unpopular with photographers, and may be applied to both divers who manage to avoid contact and those who do not. Cost and complexity of photographic equipment does not correlate well with diving competence.
- Changing the methods by which the industry provides services: Closer supervision and intervention by dive guides can reduce diver contact rates where the divers are sufficiently skilled to modify their behaviour during the dive. It does not address basic incompetence, which is common. A pre-dive briefing on responsible behaviour, regulations and environmental values can reduce the rate of diver impacts where the divers are sufficiently competent to avoid contact. Experience was not found to be a strong indicator of competence, but inexperience and lack of regular or frequent practice are generally good indicators of poor buoyancy and trim skills. More effective interventions occur when the ratio of divers to guide is low.

=== Diver carrying capacity ===
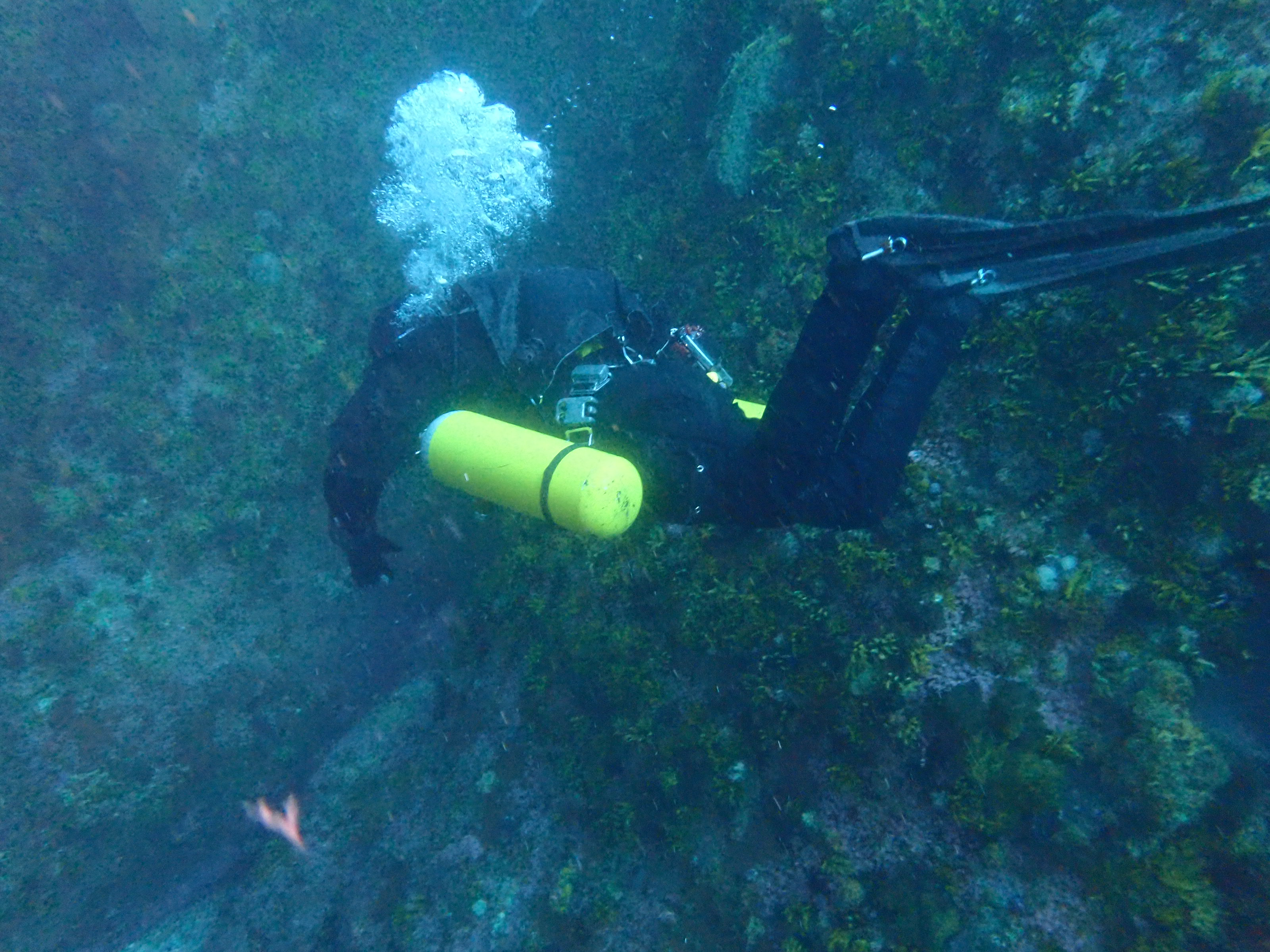
Sidemount diver trimmed well to avoid contact with the bottom on a temperate granite reef in False Bay near Cape Town

The number of dives over a time interval that results in an acceptable and stable level of degradation depends on a combination of factors that vary between sites. These include the presence of vulnerable organisms, and the stresses to which they are specifically vulnerable, the level of environmental awareness and responsibility of the divers, the diving skills and situational awareness of the divers, prevalent water conditions during dives, including currents and surge which increase difficulty of positional control, other anthropogenic stressors that may be present, and may combine their effects with diver impact, topographical details which affect diver maneuvering and risk of impact, and the size of the site. Continued periodical re-assessment will generally be necessary, even when there are no obvious large changes to external circumstances. These factors may vary considerably even within a specific ecological zone, and may be expected to be very different between for example, a tropical coral reef dominated by branching stony corals on a gradually sloping bottom with persistent moderate wave action and continuous current, in an area far from major industry, and a high profile granite corestone temperate reef with deep gullies and steep ridges, dominated by kelp, ascidians and echinoderms, and with seasonal variations in prevailing wave direction near a large industrial city. The appropriate equipment and relevant skills will also vary, and unfamiliar rental equipment can require some practice before the diver can use it well, particularly for optimising weighting and trim. Divers in training can not be expected to perform at their best while distracted by learning new skills, and this is also a factor to be considered as a potential stressor if there is no separation between training sites and sites for qualified divers.

==== Management strategies ====
Dive sites which are popular with visitors should be zoned as unsuitable for training divers. In order to ensure that the industry engaged with diving tourism does not directly or indirectly threaten the existence of this essential aquatic life, it is necessary that recreational diving service providers uphold proper carrying capacities to reduce overpopulated diving expeditions, and that researchers investigate the actual effects of recreational diving at places where there are large numbers of divers.

=== Positive impact activities ===
Recreational diver activities with an overall positive impact on the environment may include citizen science reef monitoring by volunteer recreational divers and species observation reports by underwater photographers, economic pressure by diving tourists to conserve desirable diving conditions, and cleanup of plastic and other undesirable debris by divers. Most of the citizen science projects require some level of long term commitment, including training, and reasonably frequent activity to maintain skills, and are therefore more suitable for local residents than for tourists.

Marine conservation projects using volunteer recreational divers:

- Coral Reef Alliance – Non-profit, environmental NGO focused on protecting coral reefs
- Green Fins – Coral reef conservation charity
- Project AWARE – International environmental nonprofit organization
- Reef Check – International NGO for reef conservation
- Reef Life Survey – Marine life monitoring programme based in Hobart, Tasmania

Observational record databases for science and conservation:

- iNaturalist – Website and app for sharing biodiversity observations
- iSpot – Web-based citizen science biodiversity project

== Specific regions of study ==
- Eastern Australia
- Kish Island, Iran (Persian Gulf)
- Hong Kong, China
- Great Barrier Reef, Australia
- Indonesia
- Malaysia
- New South Wales, Australia
- Okinawa, Japan
- Persian Gulf
- Philippines
- Red Sea
- Sierra Helada Marine Park, Spain (Mediterranean Sea)
- Silfra, Iceland
- Sodwana Bay, South Africa
- Southern Mozambique
- Table Mountain National Park Marine Protected Area, South Africa.

== See also ==
- Coral reef protection – Modifying human activities to reduce impact on coral reefs
- Ecotourism – Touring natural habitats while minimizing environmental impact
- Environmental issues with coral reefs – Factors which adversely affect tropical coral reefs
- Recreational diving – Diving for the purpose of leisure and enjoyment
- Recreational dive sites – Places that divers go to enjoy the underwater environment
- Scuba diving tourism – Industry based on recreational diver travel
- Shark tourism – Tourism industry for viewing wild sharks
