= Recreational dive sites =

Places that divers go to enjoy the underwater environment

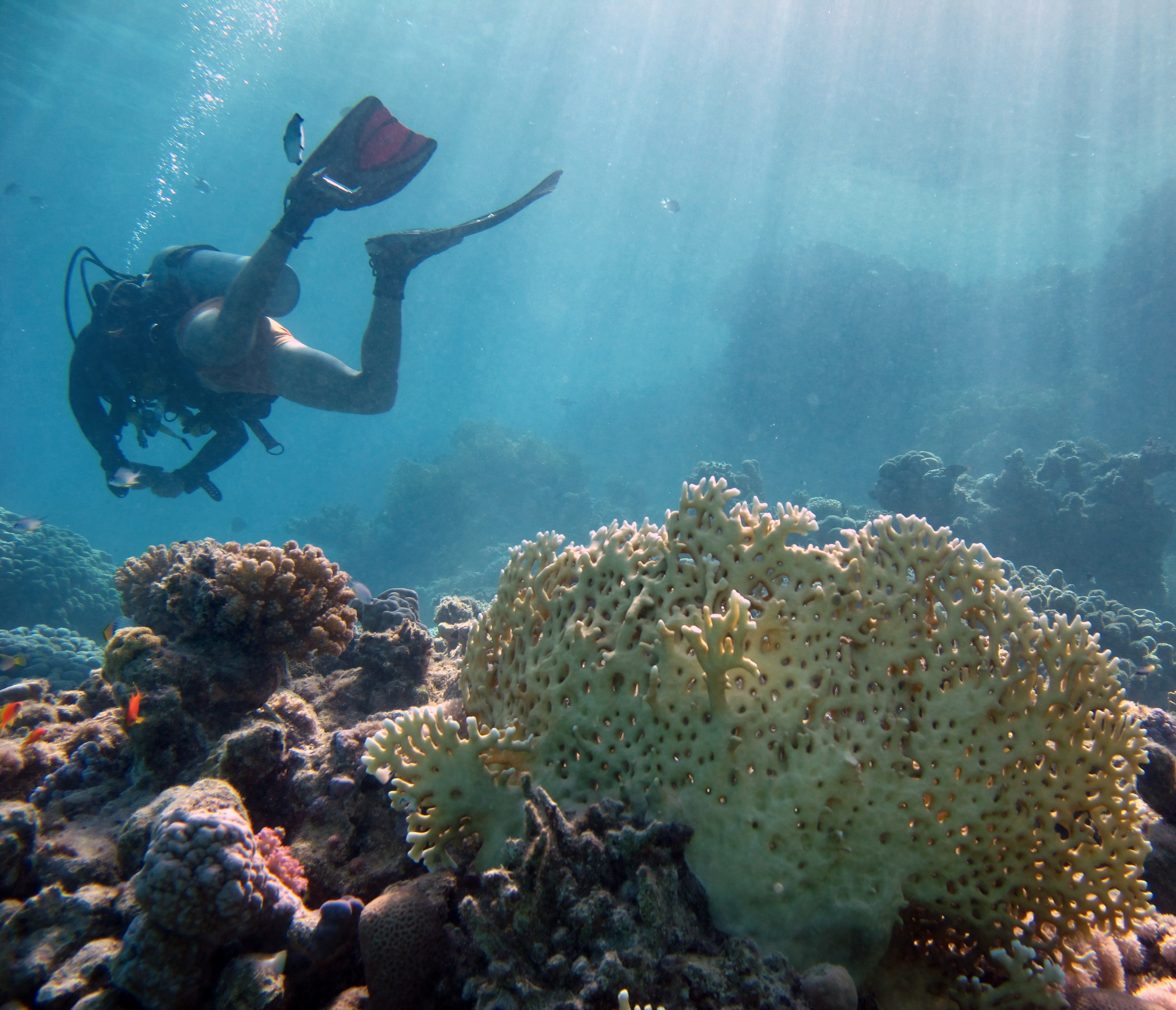
Recreational diver over a coral reef in the Red Sea

Recreational dive sites are specific places that recreational scuba divers go to enjoy the underwater environment or for training purposes. They include technical diving sites beyond the range generally accepted for recreational diving. In this context all diving done for recreational purposes is included. Professional diving tends to be done where the job is, and with the exception of diver training and leading groups of recreational divers, does not generally occur at specific sites chosen for their easy access, pleasant conditions or interesting features.

Recreational dive sites may be found in a wide range of bodies of water, and may be popular for various reasons, including accessibility, biodiversity, spectacular topography, historical or cultural interest and artifacts (such as shipwrecks), and water clarity. Tropical waters of high biodiversity and colourful sea life are popular recreational diving tourism destinations. South-east Asia, the Caribbean islands, the Red Sea and the Great Barrier Reef of Australia are regions where the clear, warm, waters, reasonably predictable conditions and colourful and diverse sea life have made recreational diving an economically important tourist industry.

Recreational divers may accept a relatively high level of risk to dive at a site perceived to be of special interest. Wreck diving and cave diving have their adherents, and enthusiasts will endure considerable hardship, risk and expense to visit caves and wrecks where few have been before. Some sites are popular almost exclusively for their convenience for training and practice of skills, such as flooded quarries. They are generally found where more interesting and pleasant diving is not locally available, or may only be accessible when weather or water conditions permit.

While divers may choose to get into the water at any arbitrary place that seems like a good idea at the time, a popular recreational dive site will usually be named, and a geographical position identified and recorded, describing the site with enough accuracy to recognise it, and hopefully, find it again.

== Dive sites ==
The term dive site (from "dive" and "site", meaning "the place, scene, or point of an occurrence or event") is used differently depending on context. In professional diving in some regions it may refer to the surface worksite from which the diving operation is supported and controlled by the diving supervisor. This may alternatively be called the diving operation control site, dive base, or control point. The professional dive site may also legally include the underwater work site and the area between the surface control area and underwater work site. In recreational diving it generally refers to the underwater environment of a dive. Where a site is named, it generally refers to the locality around a specific feature, which may be reasonably conveniently visited during a dive centred or focused on that feature. Conventions may vary regionally. In some places a named dive site may refer to a specific route with a given starting point, in others it may refer more loosely to a larger region which is far bigger than a diver could reasonably visit on dives with a common point. Such regions may later be specified in more detail as they become better known, and what was originally referred to as a single site may become several sites when they are identified and described. Where a site is named for a shipwreck, it generally refers to the known extent of the wreckage, regardless of size. Synonyms include dive spot, dive location and diving site.

=== Bodies of water commonly used for recreational diving ===
==== Coastal dive sites ====
Coastal dive site scan be in the sea or inland waters, but unless specified, generally refer to coastal areas on a continental shelf, or near an island in the sea.

Sea and ocean shorelines, reefs and shoals are salt water sites and may support high biodiversity of life forms. Tropical coral reefs are the most popular diving tourism destinations. Rocky reefs are more widespread, and support a greater variety of ecosystems, though the local biodiversity is usually more limited. Shipwrecks are also common on some coasts, and are very popular attractions for a large number of divers. Unconsolidated sediment is less likely to be visited intentionally, though there are some muck diving sites known for interesting animals.

Most dive sites are in coastal waters. Mainly because that is where most of the shallow water is, and also because they are more accessible from places suitable for human habitation. However, there are a significant number of regions known for good diving, which are relatively inaccessible to the traveller.

==== Inland dive sites ====
Inland dive sites are in bodies of water within the coastline of a land mass, usually beyond the influence of perceptible tides.

Lakes usually contain fresh water. Large lakes have many features of seas including wrecks and a variety of aquatic life. Depths may vary considerably, though they are shallow compared to the open ocean, and while surface water level may vary over the long term, they do not have noticeable tides, and seldom have significant currents. Some lakes are at high altitude and may require special considerations for altitude diving.

Artificial lakes, such as clay pits, gravel pits, quarries and dams often have low visibility. Flooded quarries are popular in inland areas for diver training and sometimes also recreational diving. Rock quarries may have reasonable underwater visibility if there is not so much mud or silt to cause low visibility. As they are not entirely natural environments and usually privately owned, quarries often contain features intentionally placed for divers to explore, such as sunken boats, automobiles, aircraft, and abandoned machinery and structures. Flooded mines may provide the equivalent of flooded caves with an overhead environment, though generally with a known extent.

Rivers generally contain fresh water but are often shallow and turbid and may have strong currents.

Caves containing water provide interesting, though relatively hazardous, opportunities for exploration, and are found both inland and at the coast.

=== Names of sites ===
Divers may choose to get into the water to explore any arbitrary place where conditions appear to be good enough to justify the effort, but do not necessarily record what is there, or even that the site exists, but a popular recreational dive site will usually be named, and a geographical position identified and recorded, describing the site with enough accuracy to recognise it, and hopefully, find it again.

Names for the sites themselves range from descriptive through quixotic to pretentious, as they are chosen at the whim of whoever dives there and names the site. There is often no standardisation, and the same site may be known by different names to different divers. Few sites are reliably mapped or have a published description with an accurate position, and many of these are caves or wrecks of identified ships. It is also common for a dive site to be named after a charted feature, such as a reef, exposed rock, promontory, or other navigational landmark, and like landmarks, the same name may be used for more than one dive site. Other sites are named for ecological features, like a species common at the site, or one that was seen there on an exploration dive. Sites that are frequently used by commercial service providers may be given names which are intended to promote the site to potential customers.

=== Popular features of dive sites ===
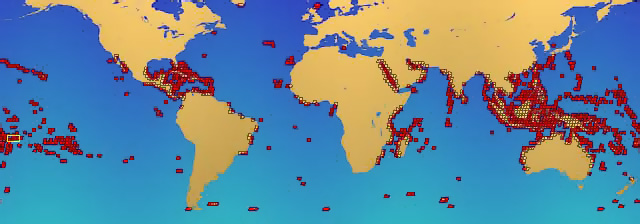
NASA image showing locations of significant coral reefs, which are often sought out by divers for their abundant, diverse life forms.

There are a wide range of underwater features which may contribute to the popularity of a dive site:

- Accessibility is important, but not critical. Some divers will travel long distances at considerable cost to get to a site with exceptional features.
- Biodiversity at the site: Popular examples are coral, sponges, fish, sting rays, molluscs, cetaceans, seals, sharks and crustaceans. Colourful organisms generally increase popularity of a site.
- The topography of the site: Coral reefs, rocky reefs, walls (underwater cliffs), pinnacles, gullies, caves, overhangs and swim-throughs (short tunnels or arches) can be spectacular. Terminology for the topography of dive sites is generally consistent with oceanographic practice, with occasional more eccentric usage.
- Historical or cultural items at the site: Shipwrecks, sunken aircraft and archaeological sites, apart from their historical value, form artificial habitats for marine life making them more attractive as dive sites.
- Underwater visibility: This can vary widely between sites and with time and other conditions. Poor visibility is caused by suspended particles in the water, such as mud, silt, suspended organic matter and plankton. Currents and surge can stir up the particles. Rainfall runoff can carry particulate matter from the shore. Diving close to the sediments on the bottom can result in the particles being kicked up by the divers fins. Sites which generally have good visibility are preferred, but poor visibility will often be tolerated if the site is sufficiently attractive for other reasons.
- Water temperature: Warm water diving is comfortable and convenient, and requires less equipment. Although cold water is uncomfortable and can cause hypothermia, cold water sites can be interesting because different species of underwater life thrive in cold conditions, and many interesting wrecks, caves and other features happen to be in cold water.
- Currents and tidal flows can transport nutrients to underwater environments increasing the variety and biomass of life at a site. Currents can also be dangerous to divers as they can carry the diver away from the surface support or the planned exit point. Currents that flow over large obstructions can cause strong local vertical currents and turbulence that are dangerous because they may cause the diver to lose buoyancy control risking barotrauma, or impact against the bottom terrain.

=== Rating of sites ===
Sites are generally rated for quality by people who do not have an exhaustive experience of the full range of sites throughout the world, and preferences differ. Criteria used for rating may differ, and are seldom specified. It is unlikely that any published ratings are unbiased, and they are not usually accompanied by a conflict of interest disclaimer. Conditions at most sites vary from day to day, often considerably, depending on various factors, particularly recent weather. The quality of the diving experience will also vary depending on the conditions at the time.

== Scuba diving tourism ==
Scuba diving tourism is the industry based on servicing the requirements of recreational divers at destinations other than where they live. It includes aspects of training, equipment sales, rental and service, guided experiences and environmental tourism.

Customer satisfaction is largely dependent on the quality of services provided, and personal communication has a strong influence on the popularity of specific service providers in a region.

Motivations to travel for scuba diving are complex and may vary considerably during the diver's development and experience. Participation can vary from once off to multiple dedicated trips per year over several decades. The popular destinations fall into several groups, including tropical reefs, shipwrecks and cave systems, each frequented by its own group of enthusiasts, with some overlap. Temperate and inland open water reef sites are generally dived by people who live relatively nearby.

Scuba diving tourism services are usually focused on providing visiting recreational divers with access to local dive sites, or organising group tours to regions where desirable dive sites exist.

The motivations of scuba divers to travel have been attributed to adventure, learning, escape, social interaction, stature, challenge and excitement, and while these are probably valid for most novice divers and some long term divers, the motivation of long term enthusiasts may be more complex. The development of a recreational diver from novice to experienced diver is usually associated with acquisition and improvement of skills, and is often accompanied by a shift in motivations to dive. Similarly, expectations of the diving experience, satisfaction with the experience available at different dive sites, and attitudes towards the underwater environment will change in divers who continue to dive over the longer term and relatively frequently. The desire to improve and learn for personal growth and the long term satisfaction and fulfilment derived from this learning is common in such divers. This could be an important factor informing the planning and management of diving tourism.

== Regions of notable biodiversity ==
=== Tropical ===
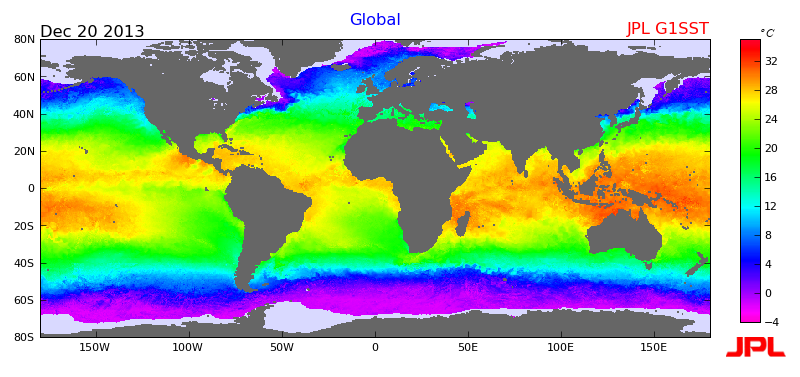
Global map of sea surface temperature, showing warmer areas around the equator and colder areas around the poles (20 December 2013 at 1-km resolution).

From a geographical point of view, the tropics (tropical regions) are defined as lying between the Tropic of Cancer in the Northern Hemisphere, and the Tropic of Capricorn in the Southern Hemisphere. These limits are well defined, but do not accurately indicate what the water temperature will be. Another way of loosely defining tropical diving is by arbitrarily selecting a limiting temperature, such as 24 °C (75 °F) but there are places outside the tropics with water in thus range, and places in the tropics with colder water, and water temperature can change with the season, weather, and multi-seasonal variations such as El Niño–Southern Oscillation.

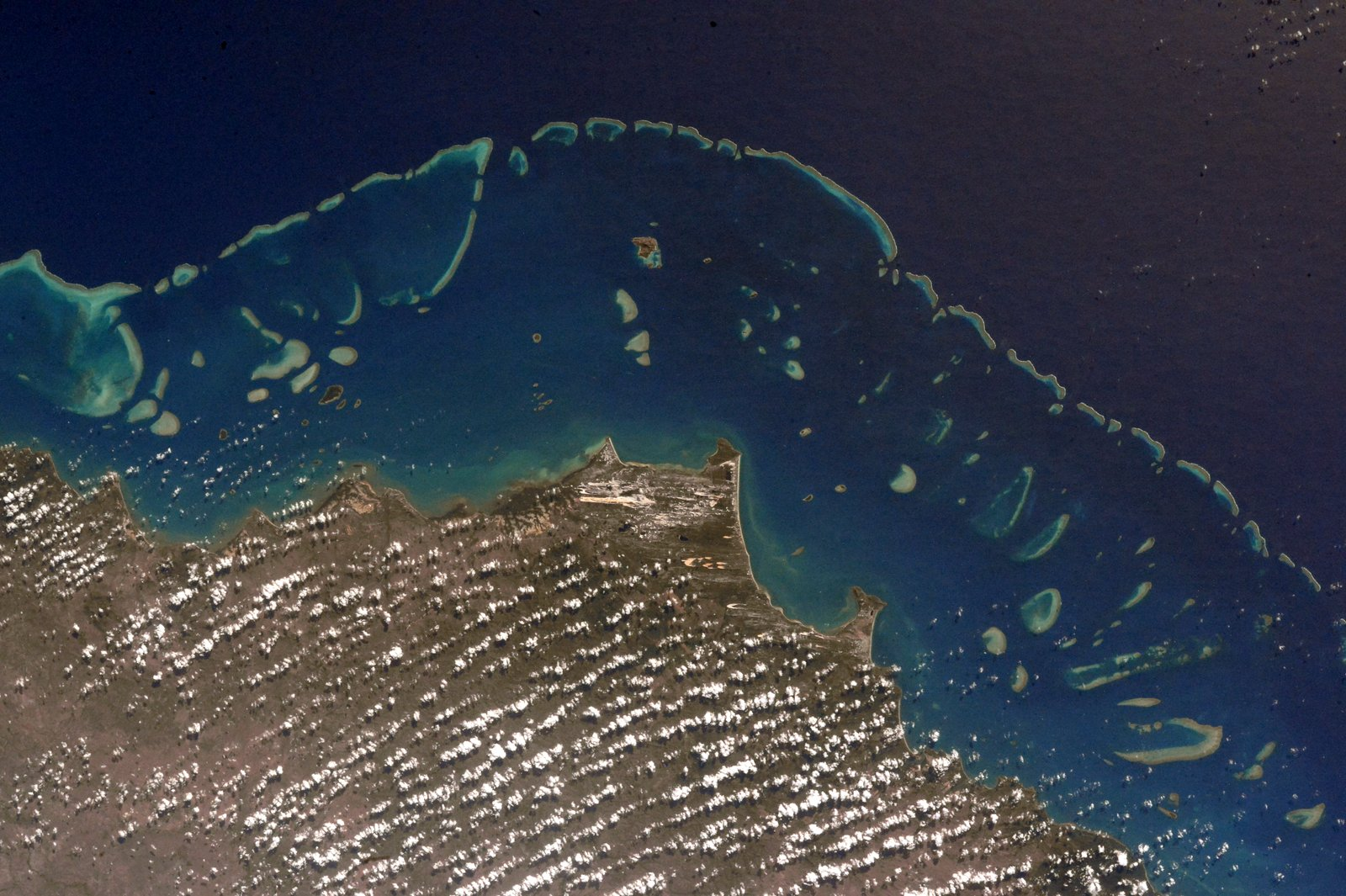
Image of part of the Great Barrier Reef adjacent to Queensland, taken from the International Space Station

The Great Barrier Reef is the world's largest coral reef system, composed of over 2,900 individual reefs and 900 islands stretching for over 2,300 kilometres (1,400 mi) over an area of approximately 344,400 square kilometres (133,000 mi^{2}). The reef is located in the Coral Sea, off the coast of Queensland, Australia, separated from the coast by a channel 160 kilometres (100 mi) wide in places and over 61 metres (200 ft) deep. The Great Barrier Reef can be seen from outer space and is the world's biggest single structure made by living organisms. This reef structure is composed of and built by billions of tiny organisms, known as coral polyps. It supports a wide diversity of life and was selected as a World Heritage Site in 1981. CNN labelled it one of the Seven Natural Wonders of the World in 1997. A large part of the reef is protected by the Great Barrier Reef Marine Park, which helps to limit the impact of human use, such as fishing and tourism.Tourism is an important economic activity for the region, generating over AUD$3 billion per year.

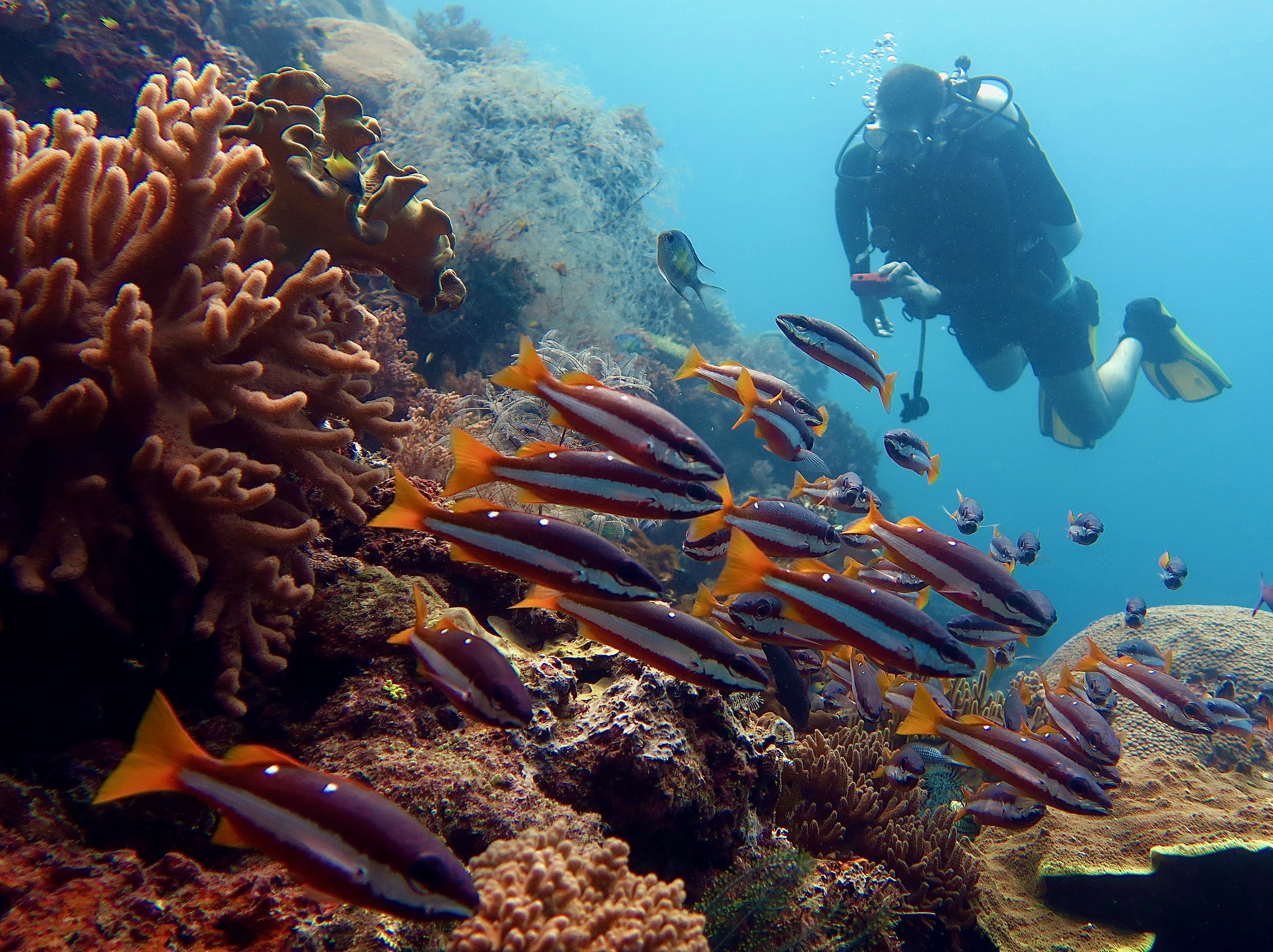
A diver in Raja Ampat

With more than 17,508 islands, Indonesia has many regions suitable for recreational diving. With 20% of the world's coral reefs, over 3,000 different species of fish and about 600 coral species, deep water trenches, volcanic sea mounts, World War II wrecks, and a very large variety of macro life, scuba diving in Indonesia is excellent and relatively inexpensive.Bunaken National Marine Park, at the northern tip of Sulawesi, claims to have seven times more genera of coral than Hawaii, and has more than 70% of all the known fish species of the Western Indo-Pacific. Other popular dive sites are on Bali at Candidasa and Menjangan. Across the Badung Strait from Bali, there are several popular dive sites on Nusa Lembongan and Nusa Penida. Lombok's three Gilis (Gili Air, Gili Meno and Gili Trawangan) are popular, as is Bangka. Saronde Island is also a popular area in Gorontalo, Sulawesi. Some of the most famous diving sites in Indonesia are also the most difficult to reach, like Biak off the coast of Papua and the Alor Archipelago.

- The Red Sea
- Caribbean sea

The iSimangaliso Marine Protected Area is a coastal and offshore marine protected area in KwaZulu-Natal from the South Africa-Mozambique border in the north to Cape St Lucia lighthouse in the south. There is a diving resort area serving this MPA at Sodwana Bay. The recreational diving area is in the tropical Delagoa ecoregion in the north of kwaZulu-Natal, which extends from Cape Vidal northwards into Mozambique. There are some species endemic to South Africa along this coastline, but most of the species are tropical Indo-Pacific. This is one of the very few places that coelacanths have been seen in their natural habitat by divers.

=== Temperate ===
The temperate regions, or middle latitudes are between the tropics and the polar circles in each hemisphere, but are even less clearly an indication of water temperature. The water temperature range for temperate diving has also been rather arbitrarily specified, as between 10 and 24 °C (50 and 75 °F), but actual sea surface temperatures in the middle latitudes go outside this range in both directions, and are also significantly affected by major surface currents, season and weather.

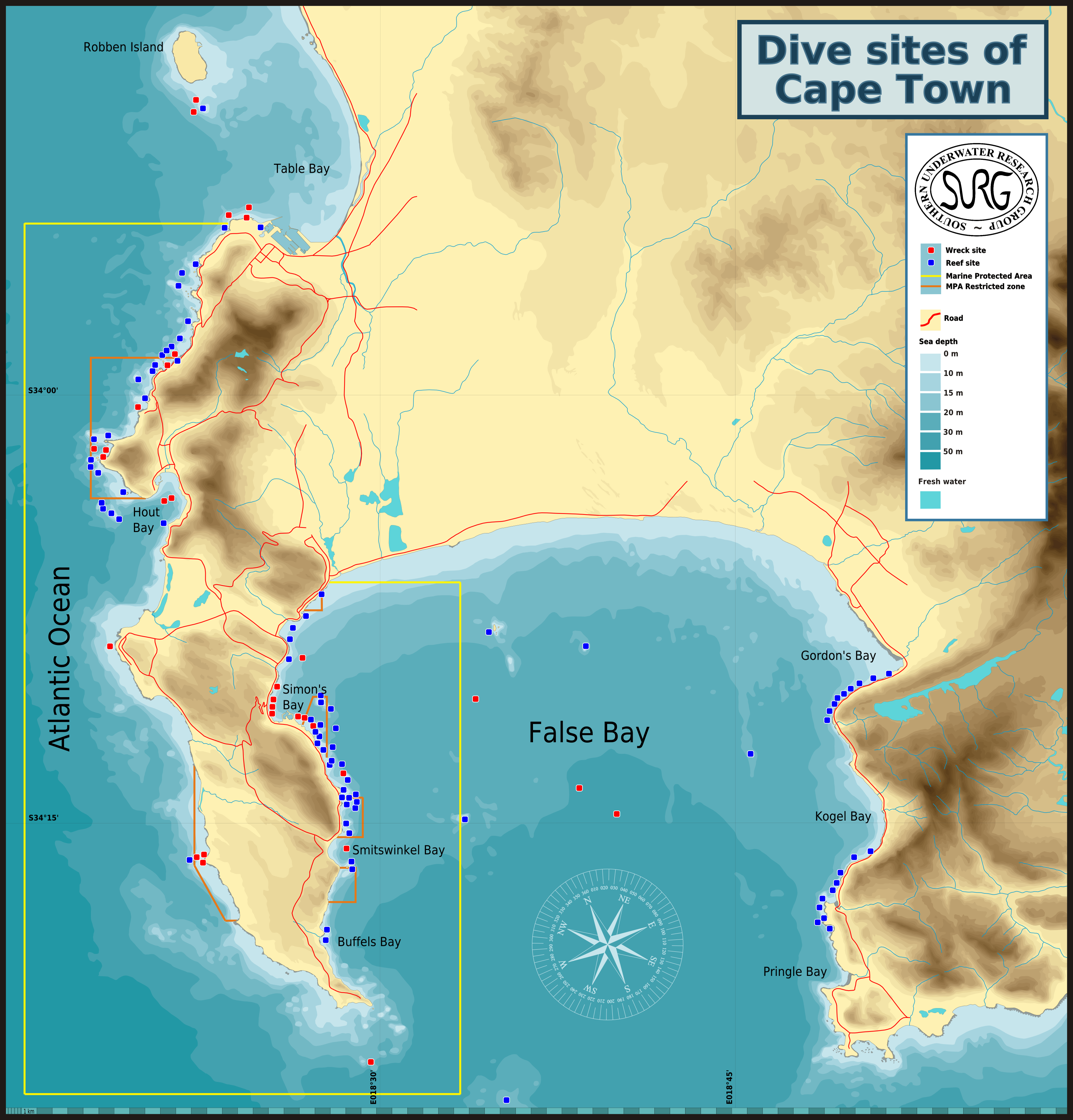
Recreational dive sites of the greater Cape Town region. The yellow lines indicate the boundary of the Table Mountain National Park MPA.

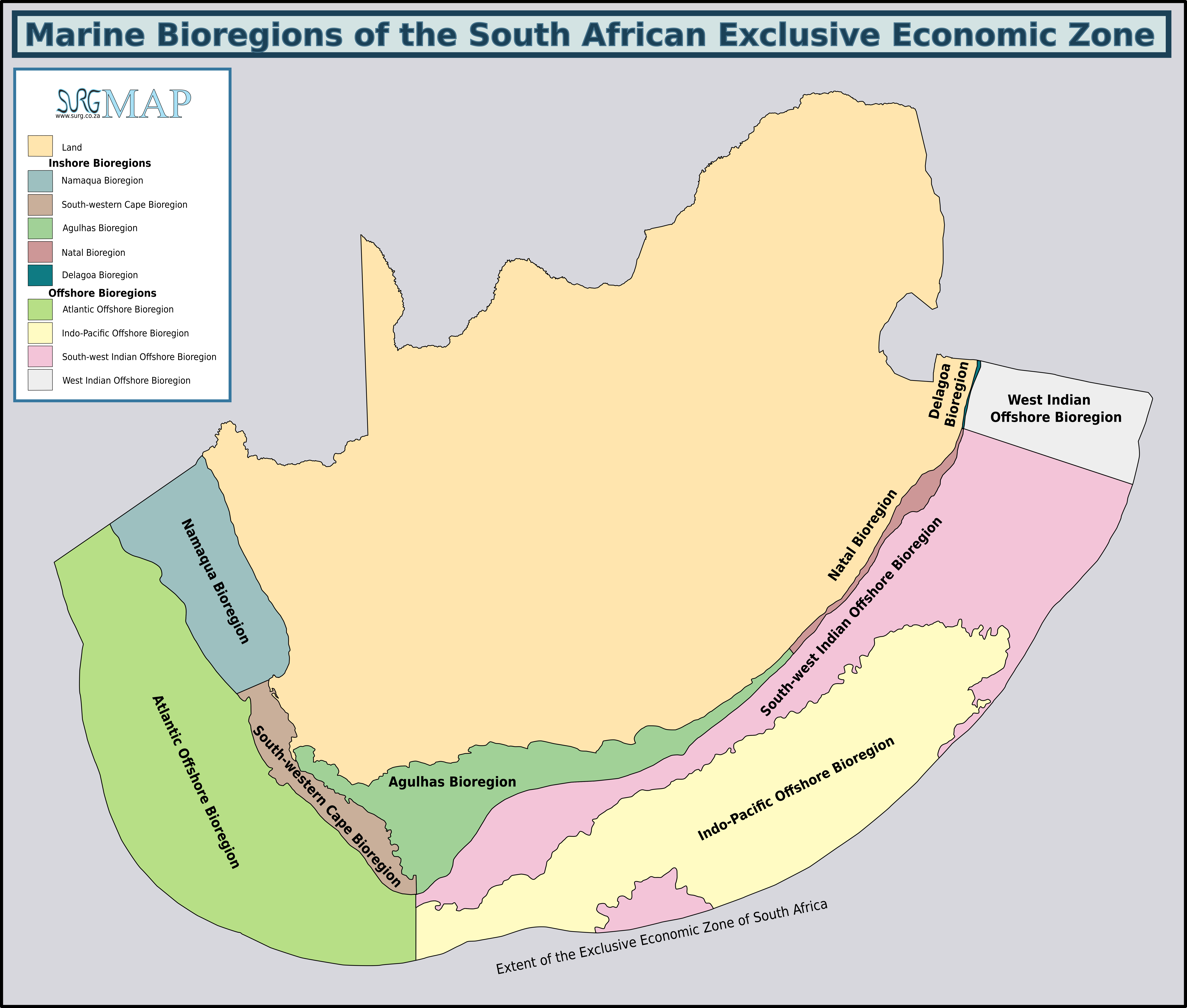
Marine bioregions of the South African coast

The Table Mountain National Park Marine Protected Area around the Cape Peninsula is a popular diving region in the Atlantic Ocean, in the vicinity of Cape Town, South Africa, with more than 250 named dive sites, many of which have been surveyed and mapped. The Cape Peninsula marks the boundary between the cool temperate Benguela ecoregion, which extends from Namibia to Cape Point, and is dominated by the cold Benguela Current, and the warm temperate Agulhas ecoregion to the east of Cape Point which extends eastwards to the Mbashe River. The break at Cape Point is very distinct in the inshore depth ranges, and the waters of the east and west sides of the peninsula support noticeably different ecologies, though there is a significant overlap of resident organisms. There are a large proportion of species endemic to South Africa along this coastline.

The Tsitsikamma Marine Protected Area in the south coast of South Africa is another temperate region of high biodiversity and endemism, but the tourism infrastructure is not optimised for diving, as the sea conditions are somewhat unpredictable.

=== Polar ===
From a diving perspective, polar diving includes all diving within the polar zones, and the water is generally below 10 °C (50 °F), and much of it is often at or slightly below 0 °C (32 °F) and covered by ice.

Scuba diving in Antarctica has transitioned from being exclusively for scientists but has been available for recreational purposes for the past 15 years. Organised diving for tourists is done primarily in the Antarctic Peninsula. It has been gaining popularity due to the availability of reasonably priced drysuits.

== Types of dive sites ==
Dive sites may be classified under various types, and some sites fall under more than one of these types.

=== Reef dive sites ===
In the context of recreational diving, a reef may be a coral reef or a bottom of predominantly consolidated inorganic material, like rocky reef, and in the broader sense includes artificial structures and even ships sunk as artificial reefs. Reef dive sites are the most numerous type as there is a very large amount of reef, widely distributed in most coastal waters, and it provides more topographical and visible biological diversity than unconsolidated sediment, so is more attractive to recreational divers.

Reef diving regions are geographical regions of arbitrary size known for including more than one named reef dive site, while a reef dive site is a specific part of a reef known by a name, which recreational divers visit to dive.

Coral reef areas generally refer to reefs built by tropical stony corals, but soft corals and other non-reef-building corals may be found over a much wider range of sea temperatures and depths, and in many cases are more colourful than the reef-building corals. The attractions of tropical reef building corals are more in the structure of the reef, which can be very complex, and the high biodiversity of animals of these reefs.

Rocky reefs are more widespread, and though the structure is usually relatively simple, they may support a wide variety of seaweed and benthic invertebrates, some of which may be very colourful, and form a dense layer on the geological reef structure, to the extent that the actual rock may seldom be visible. Much depends on the biological productivity of the reef, which can be strongly affected by currents, river inflow, and particularly areas subject to deep-water upwellings, such as on the temperate west coasts of several continents and islands. The topography of rocky reefs can be massively spectacular. The finer detail is usually less complex than on coral reefs, but the large scale structure can be impressive, particularly when visibility is good enough to appreciate the landforms. The reef structure is also usually relatively robust, and while brittle and fragile organisms may be equally vulnerable to contact by clumsy divers, the rock structure tends to be virtually indestructible.

==== Wall dive sites ====
Wall diving is reef diving where the main characteristic of the site is that the terrain is predominantly near vertical. It is basically an underwater cliff. The height of the wall can vary from a few metres to hundreds of metres. The top of the wall must be within diving depth, but the bottom may be far below or reasonably close to the surface.

The wall face may be anything from a relatively smooth face, at a steep slope, through vertical to a moderate overhang, and may be a single cliff face, or stepped, or have overhangs, caves, ledges, gullies, and cracks. In plan it can be anything from nearly straight to highly convoluted, with gullies, curves, sudden changes of direction, transverse canyons, and offshore stacks. A wall may be a few tens of metres long or may extend for several kilometres.

The structure of the wall face can be virtually any kind of sufficiently durable rock, or coral reef, and artificial structures may also be considered walls for recreational diving.

Local biodiversity may be higher than average for the region due to wide depth range and variety of habitats. Both pelagic and benthic organisms may be present. Much of the marine benthic life will usually be relatively delicate and sensitive to impact by divers and their equipment, making it undesirable ton use the wall face as place to hold onto for position and depth control, though some divers routinely use reef hooks for this purpose.

The most universal skill requirement is good buoyancy control, which is needed to avoid excessive depth and rapid depth changes in either direction, particularly in the presence of turbulence and vertical flow.

Walls suitable for diving are usually relatively close to the shore, and in some cases are a continuation of a shoreline cliff face. Most wall dive sites are in the sea, but they can also be found inland in sinkholes, caves, and flooded quarries and mines.

Specific regions known for wall dive sites include the Cayman Islands, Palau, Indonesia, Papua New Guinea, Turks & Caicos, Bahamas, Honduras, Belize, Hawaii, Red Sea, Fiji, and others, including many outside the tropics. Inshore dive sites in North America with vertical rock faces include Puget Sound in Washington, Monterey Bay, and Catalina Island in California.

==== Artificial reefs ====
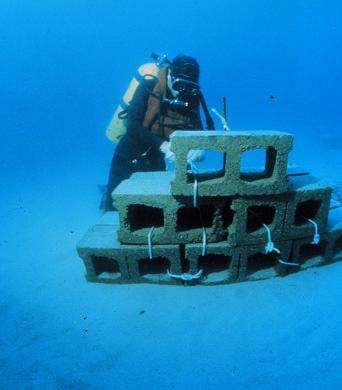
Constructing an artificial reef using concrete breeze blocks

An artificial reef is a human-created underwater structure, typically built to promote marine life in areas with a generally featureless bottom, to control erosion, block ship passage, block the use of trawling nets, or improve surfing.

Many reefs are built using objects that were built for other purposes, such as by sinking oil rigs (through the Rigs-to-Reefs program), scuttling ships, or by deploying rubble or construction debris. Other artificial reefs are purpose-built (e.g. the reef balls) from PVC or concrete. Shipwrecks may become artificial reefs when preserved on the seafloor. Jetties and breakwaters are secondarily artificial reefs. Regardless of construction method, artificial reefs generally provide hard surfaces where algae and sessile ebibenthic invertebrates such as barnacles, corals, and oysters attach; the accumulation of attached marine life in turn provides intricate habitat and food for mobile benthic invertebrates and assemblages of fish. In addition to shipwrecks, there are artificial reefs made from decommissioned subway cars, concrete, electrified steel, and even the cremated remains of divers.

Occasionally sculpture works have been placed underwater singly or in groups, as attractions for divers, and they also function as artificial reefs.

=== Cave dive sites ===
Cave diving is underwater diving in water-filled caves. It may be considered an extreme sport due to the range of hazards and the difficulty of mitigating them to an acceptable level. The equipment used varies depending on the circumstances, and ranges from breath hold to surface supplied, but almost all cave diving is done using scuba equipment, often in specialised configurations. Recreational cave diving is generally considered to be a type of technical diving due to the lack of a free surface during large parts of the dive, and often involves decompression.

A distinction is made by recreational diver training agencies between cave diving and cavern diving, where cavern diving is deemed to be diving in those parts of a cave where the exit to open water can be seen by natural light. An arbitrary distance limit to the open water surface may also be specified. There are relatively few practitioners of cave diving. This is due in part to the specialized equipment and skill sets required, and in part because of the high potential risks due to the specific environment. Despite these risks, water-filled caves attract scuba divers, cavers, and speleologists due to their often unexplored nature, and present divers with a technical diving challenge. Underwater caves have a wide range of physical features, and can contain fauna not found elsewhere.

=== Quarry dive sites ===
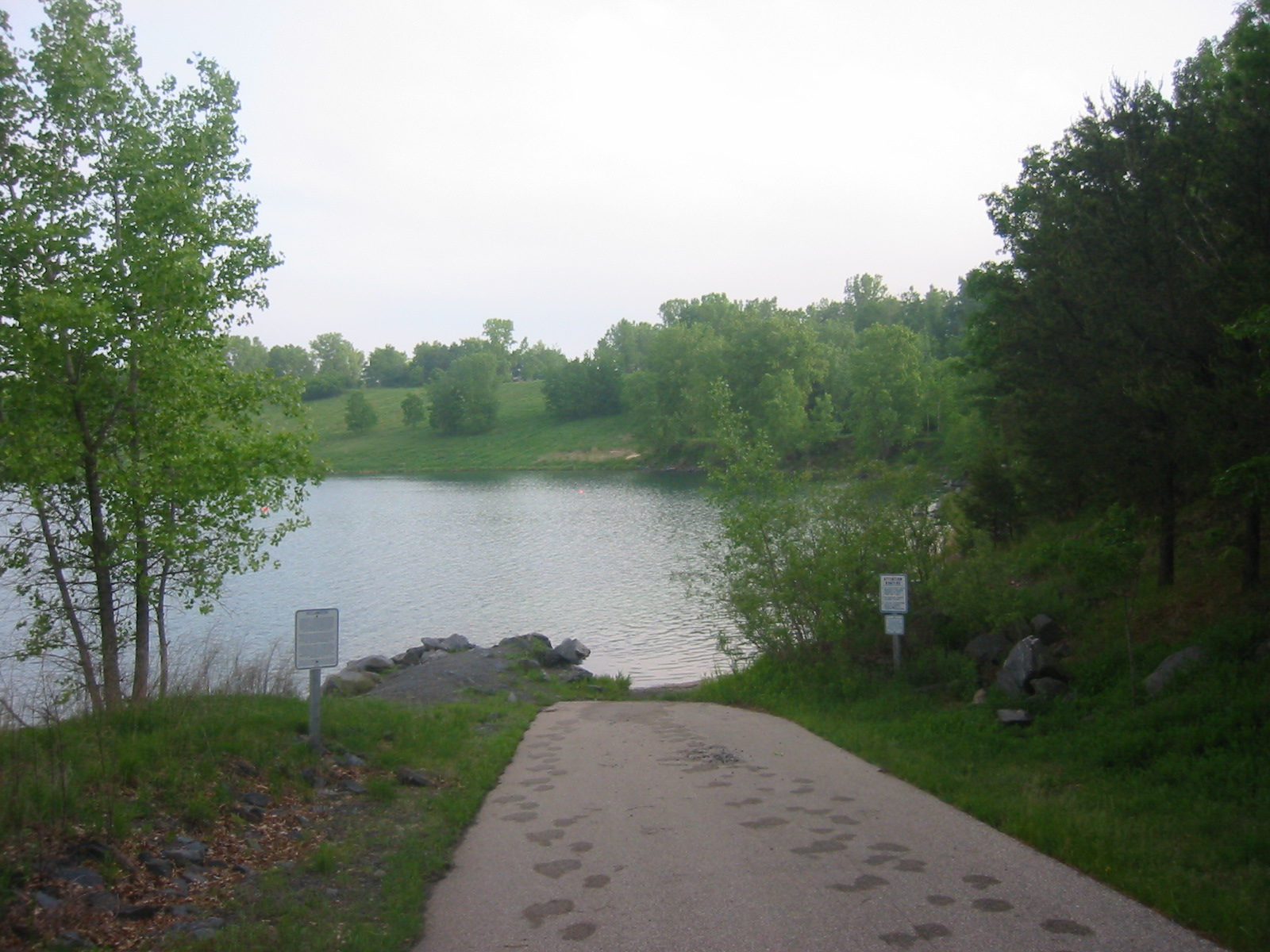
Wazee Lake near Black River Falls, Wisconsin is a former iron mining quarry now used for scuba diving and other uses.

Scuba diving quarries are depleted or abandoned rock quarries that have been allowed to fill with ground water, and rededicated to the purpose of scuba diving. They may offer deep, clean, clear, still, fresh water with excellent visibility, or low visibility in turbid water from surface runoff. They have no currents or undertow. They are often used as training sites for new divers, where classes and certification dives are carried out. Many have a dive shop on site to rent out equipment and sell air fills and diving equipment. Lodging or camping areas may be available on site.

Quarries in stone may have clear water, with greater visibility than in many inland lakes. Ground water is the primary source of the water that fills these quarries once they are no longer pumped out for mining operations. Many quarry mining operations are located in areas where filling from other, less clean sources, such as rivers and surface runoff of rainwater is not as likely.

Over time, most quarries tend to be contaminated with erosion products and nutrients from surface runoff, causing many to develop a green tint due to algae growth, and accumulations of silt on the bottoms and other surfaces.

Fresh water scuba diving does not require much difference in equipment from diving in the sea. Water temperatures generally decrease as depth increases, and may be as low as 4 °C (39 °F) at depth. In those temperatures dry suit diving is recommended, but in warmer temperatures, wetsuits may be sufficient. Diving in clean fresh water generally requires less post dive maintenance.

The operators of scuba diving quarries may add objects or debris fields to the bottom of the quarry for divers to explore while scuba diving. Mostly these are man made objects such as boats, cars, and trucks. Some quarries have such large objects as school buses, small buildings, or commercial airliners on the bottom. These sites may be mapped out and marked with guide lines under the water, particularly if visibility is poor.

The owners or operators of quarries may stock the quarry with fish to provide entertainment for divers. These are commonly the same species of fish that thrive naturally in local lakes and rivers, but some quarries are stocked with more exotic fish. The ecology is usually very limited.

=== Wreck dive sites ===
Wreck diving is recreational diving where the wreckage of ships, aircraft and other artificial structures is visited. Although most wreck dive sites are the remains of ships sunk by accident or enemy action in times of war, there are a large number of ships scuttled to create dive sites at places where the conditions are more suitable for recreational diving. The recreation of wreck diving makes no distinction as to how the vessel ended up on the bottom, though this may be of importance to the individual diver, and some wreck hunters spend large amounts of time and money in searches for unlocated wrecks. There is a large overlap between recreational and archaeological wreck hunting and diving, and in some cases between recreational wreck diving and unauthorised recovery of artifacts. Some wreck diving involves penetration of the wreckage, making a direct ascent to the surface impossible for a part of the dive. Only a small fraction of the world's shipwrecks are in known positions suitable for access by divers, and their condition deteriorates over time.

== Environmental impact of recreational diving ==
The environmental impact of recreational diving is the effects of diving tourism on the marine environment. Usually these are considered to be adverse effects, and include damage to reef organisms by incompetent and ignorant divers, but there may also be positive effects when the environment is recognised by the local communities to be worth more in good condition than degraded by inappropriate use, which encourages conservation efforts.

During the 20th century recreational scuba diving was considered to have generally low environmental impact, and was consequently one of the activities permitted in most marine protected areas. Since the 1970s diving has changed from an elite activity to a more accessible recreation, marketed to a very wide demographic. To some extent better equipment has been substituted for more rigorous training, and the reduction in perceived risk has shortened minimum training requirements by several training agencies. Training has concentrated on an acceptable risk to the diver, and paid less attention to the environment. The increase in the popularity of diving and in tourist access to sensitive ecological systems has led to the recognition that the activity can have significant environmental consequences.

Scuba diving has grown in popularity during the 21st century, as is shown by the number of certifications issued worldwide, which has increased to about 23 million by 2016 at about one million per year. Scuba diving tourism is a growth industry, and it is necessary to consider environmental sustainability, as the expanding impact of divers can adversely affect the marine environment in several ways, and the impact also depends on the specific environment. Tropical coral reefs are more easily damaged by poor diving skills than some temperate reefs, where the environment is more robust due to rougher sea conditions and fewer fragile, slow-growing organisms. The same pleasant sea conditions that allow development of relatively delicate and highly diverse ecologies also attract the greatest number of tourists, including divers who dive infrequently, exclusively on vacation and never fully develop the skills to dive in an environmentally friendly way. Low impact diving training has been shown to be effective in reducing diver contact.

Environmental impact can expand in scope when a destination is commercially developed to provide more facilities to encourage the expansion of tourism.
