= Scuba diving tourism =

Industry based on recreational diver travel

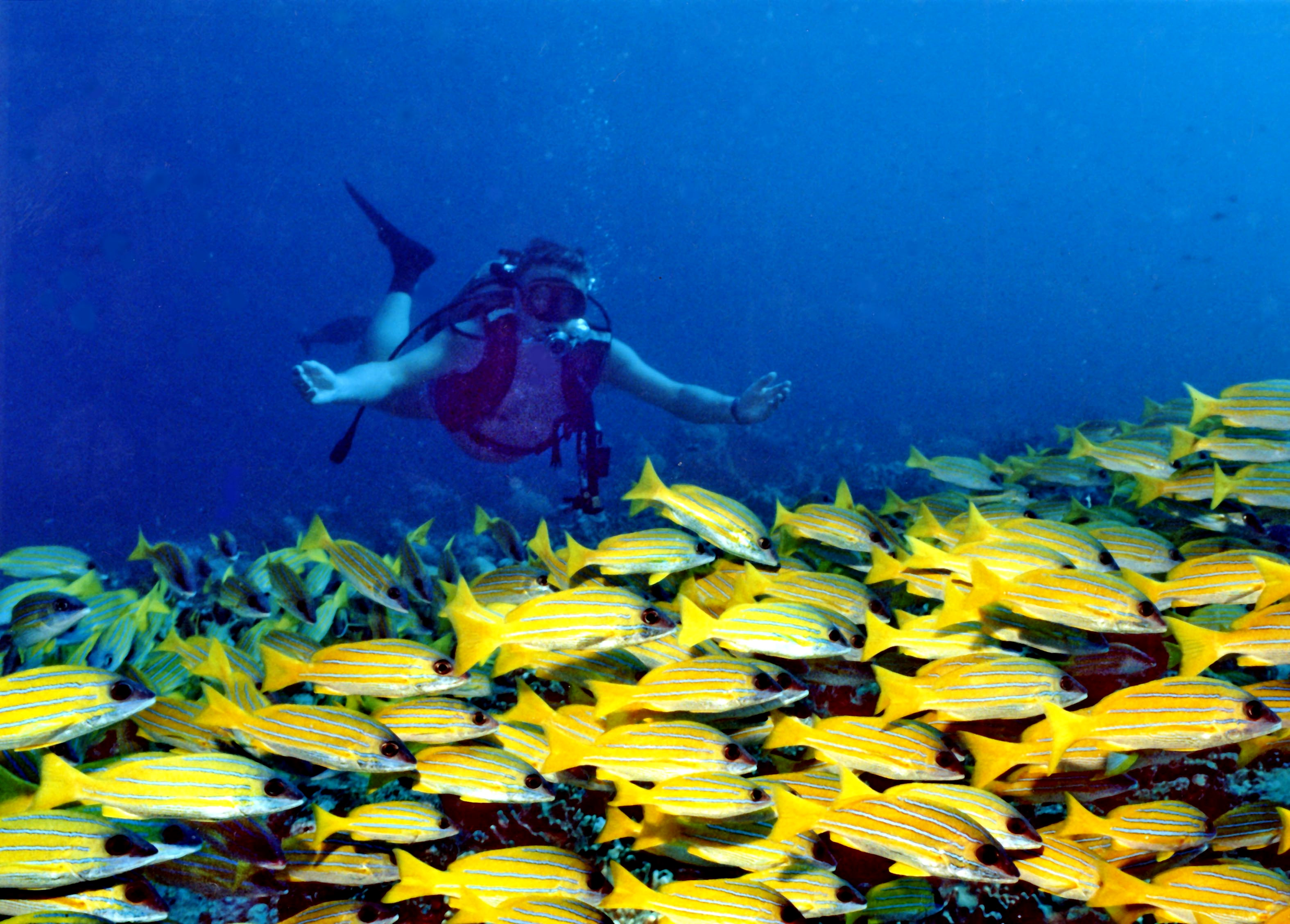
Scuba diver in Maldives

Scuba diving tourism is the industry based on servicing the requirements of recreational divers at destinations other than where they live. It includes aspects of training, equipment sales, rental and service, guided experiences and environmental tourism.

Motivations to travel for scuba diving are complex and may vary considerably during the diver's development and experience. Participation can vary from once off to multiple dedicated trips per year over several decades. The popular destinations fall into several groups, including tropical reefs, shipwrecks and cave systems, each frequented by its own group of enthusiasts, with some overlap. Temperate and inland open water reef sites are generally dived by people who live relatively nearby.

The industry provides both tangible and intangible goods and services. The tangible component includes provision of equipment for rental and for sale, while intangibles include education and skill development, safety and convenience by way of dive charter services and guide services on dives. Customer satisfaction is largely dependent on the quality of services provided, and personal communication has a strong influence on the popularity of specific service providers in a region.

Scuba diving tourism is a growth industry, and it is necessary to consider environmental sustainability, as the expanding impact of divers can adversely affect the marine environment in several ways, and the impact also depends on the specific environment. The same pleasant sea conditions that allow development of relatively delicate and highly diverse ecologies also attract the greatest number of tourists, including divers who dive infrequently, exclusively on vacation and never fully develop the skills to dive in an environmentally friendly way. Several studies have found the main reason for contact by inexperienced divers to be poor buoyancy control, and that damage to reefs by divers can be minimized by modifying the behavior of those divers. Several methodologies have been developed with the intention of minimising the environmental impact of divers on coral reefs so that the industry can continue to develop sustainably.

Scuba diving is an equipment intensive activity, requiring significant capital outlay to establish a retail outlet with the expected range of equipment and filling facilities. Dive boats are a large capital expense, with high running costs. There are also health and safety aspects for the operator and the customer. Adequate quality control is necessary to avoid providing a harmful product. The cost of qualifying as a diving instructor is significant in time and money. Economic sustainability is affected by environmental awareness and conservation, service delivery and customer satisfaction, and sustainable business management. Liability issues can be managed by the use of waivers, declarations of medical fitness to dive, adherence to industry best standards, and public liability insurance.

== History ==
The history of scuba diving tourism is linked to the history of scuba equipment development and availability, and to the development of training systems that opened up the activity to sufficient numbers to support the industry. Key equipment developments include swimfins, which give the diver underwater mobility and free the hands for other functions, the diving mask, which provides underwater vision, the open circuit regulator, a simple and reliable breathing gas source, the buoyancy compensator, which allows the diver to swim comfortably above the bottom, and float at the surface, wetsuit, a simple and easy to use protection from moderately cold water, submersible pressure gauge, allowing easy monitoring of remaining breathing gas, dive computers, and nitrox breathing gas, both of which allowed longer dives without decompression.

The growth of the diving industry in a region tends to follow a logistic curve, with a slow start and mostly established, experienced divers with relatively high skill levels exploring a new area where there is little supporting infrastructure. As the area becomes popular, the infrastructure develops and the growth accelerates until it is limited by carrying capacity is approached. By this time the main diver demography has shifted towards the inexperienced and often uncertified diver, with low skill levels and a greater tendency to damage the environment due to ignorance and lack of basic diving skills. Beyond this stage the situation may stabilise if managed well, or if not, the deterioration in value to the tourist may cause a reduction in popularity and a loss of trade.

Too much competition for customers amongst a large number of diving service providers in a region can lead to low profit margins and pressure on struggling companies to cut costs by following unsustainable diving practices and providing substandard equipment. A reduction in numbers may lead to more cooperation between the remaining companies, and a greater willingness to follow sustainable practices.

The shape of the curve will vary depending on the region. Areas with more resilient ecologies may see larger numbers while remaining viable, while areas with sensitive ecologies may suffer early collapse. Climate change is likely to render many areas more sensitive to diver impact and most will probably have a reduction in carrying capacity based on limits of acceptable change. The sites that remain viable for longer may receive the overflow from sites which suffer ecological collapse, putting them under greater stress as the less competent divers flood areas that were previously less attractive to them.

== Motivation ==
The motivations of scuba divers to travel have been attributed to adventure, learning, escape, social interaction, stature, challenge and excitement, and while these are probably valid for most novice divers and some long term divers, the motivation of long term enthusiasts may be more complex. The development of a recreational diver from novice to experienced diver is usually associated with acquisition and improvement of skills, and is often accompanied by a shift in motivations to dive. Similarly, expectations of the diving experience, satisfaction with the experience available at different dive sites, and attitudes towards the underwater environment will change in divers who continue to dive over the longer term and relatively frequently. The desire to improve and learn for personal growth and the long term satisfaction and fulfilment derived from this learning is common in such divers. This could be an important factor informing the planning and management of diving tourism.

== Destinations ==
Three main classes of recreational diving tourism destinations exist. These are tropical reefs, shipwrecks, and cave systems. Each caters to a different clientele, though there is some overlap. Temperate reefs are less popular as tourist attractions, but can have their own enthusiasts, including short range tourism and incidental dive tourism associated with general tourism in the region. Any exceptional dive site may be visited by expeditionary dive tourists once the attractions are known, though these destinations are generally not serviced by mainstream tourism service providers.

=== Regions where recreational diving is a major tourist industry ===
There are a few regions where international diver tourism is a significant part of the economy They are mostly tropical areas with extensive coral reefs and predictable weather and water conditions, and often have relatively undeveloped industrial economies.

- Great Barrier Reef of Australia
- The Red Sea
  - Hurghada is one of the diving destinations on the Red Sea with rich marine biodiversity, good visibility, a variety of dive sites suitable for different skill levels, including historic shipwrecks, and is accessible at all times of the year.
- The Caribbean Sea
- Indonesia
- Thailand
- The Coral Triangle of southeast Asia:
  - The Philippines
  - Malaysia

Other regions are also popular for diving, but the relative importance of scuba tourism is lower. There are a very large number of dive sites in Europe, and also in parts of the US, reflecting the origins of the activity and a large fraction of the tourists.

=== Tropical coral reefs ===
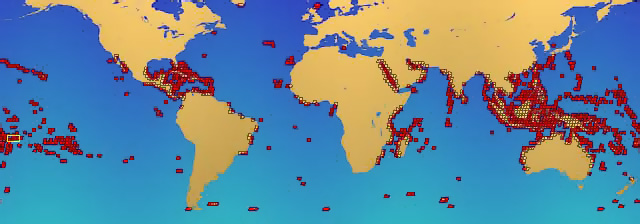
NASA image showing locations of significant coral reefs, which are often sought out by divers for their abundant, diverse life forms.

Tropical coral reefs are popular recreational diving tourism destinations, as they are generally both pleasant and colorful to dive, relatively low in serious hazards, and the water is at a comfortable temperature, so they attract divers of all levels of competence. They are more easily damaged by poor diving skills than some temperate reefs, where the environment is more robust due to rougher sea conditions and fewer fragile, slow-growing organisms. The same pleasant sea conditions that allow development of relatively delicate and highly diverse ecologies also attract the greatest number of tourists, including divers who dive infrequently, exclusively on vacation and never fully develop the skills to dive in an environmentally friendly way. Low impact diving training has been shown to be effective in reducing diver contact.

Regions include:

- The Great Barrier Reef of eastern Australia
- Indonesia
- The Philippines
- The Caribbean Sea
- Indian Ocean islands such as
  - Seychelles
  - Maldives
  - Mauritius
- The Red Sea
- Indochina
- Tropical east Africa
  - Mozambique
  - Kenya
  - Tanzania
  - Madagascar
  - Sodwana Bay in northeastern South Africa

=== Shipwrecks ===
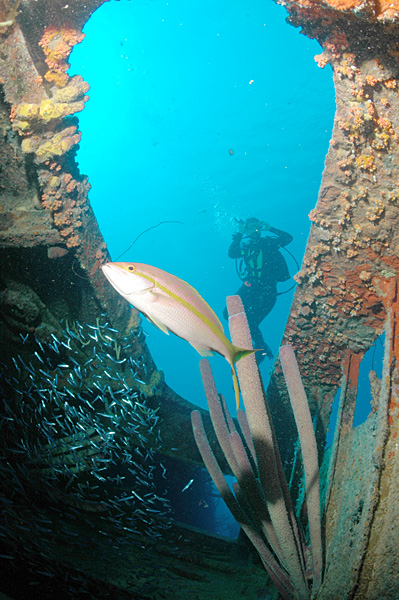
Diver at the wreck of the Hilma Hooker, Netherlands Antilles.

Wreck diving is recreational diving where the wreckage of ships, aircraft and other artificial structures are explored. Although most wreck dive sites are at shipwrecks, there is an increasing trend to scuttle retired ships to create artificial reef sites. Diving to crashed aircraft can also be considered wreck diving. The recreation of wreck diving makes no distinction as to how the vessel ended up on the bottom. Some wreck diving involves penetration of the wreckage, making a direct ascent to the surface impossible for a part of the dive.

Wreck diving may be divided into three categories of differing hazard and skill and certification requirement:

- Non-penetration diving (i.e. swimming over the wreck)
- Limited penetration diving, within the "light zone"
- Full penetration diving, beyond the "light zone"

The inherent hazards of wreck diving may be aggravated by local circumstances like depth, layout and condition of the wreck, the silting hazard, and general sea conditions such as visibility, illumination, surge and currents, and water temperature. Training for wreck diving may be marketed as an associated service.

=== Flooded cave systems ===
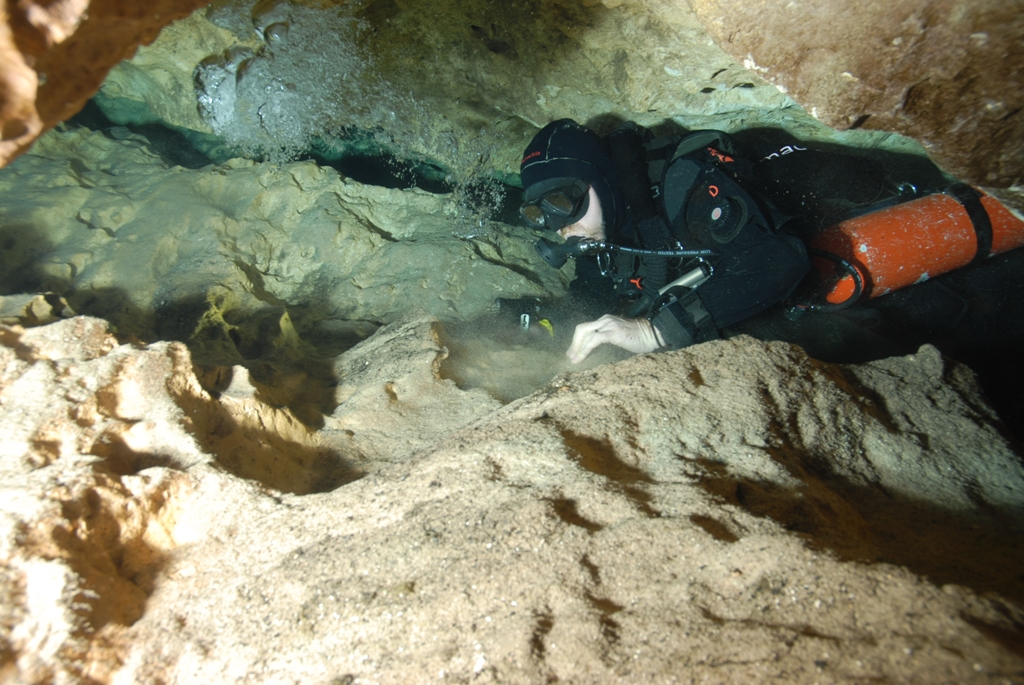
Sidemount diver in a fairly tight space

Cave diving is diving in water-filled caves, which is considered an extreme sport. The equipment used varies depending on the circumstances, but almost all cave diving is done using scuba equipment, often in specialised configurations with redundancies such as sidemount or backmounted twinset. Recreational cave diving is generally considered to be a type of technical diving due to the lack of a free surface during large parts of the dive, and often involves planned decompression stops. A distinction is made by recreational diver training agencies between cave diving and cavern diving, where cavern diving is deemed to be diving in those parts of a cave where the exit to open water can be seen by natural light. An arbitrary distance limit to the open water surface may also be specified. Cave diving is a specialist aspect of scuba tourism, as the risks are relatively high and the skill requirements are stringent. Cave diving tourism is generally serviced by specialist dive guides and instructors.

Regions include:

- The cenotes of the Yucatán peninsula, Mexico.

== Dive resorts ==
A dive resort is a recreational diving service provider which also provides accommodation for clients and their families. They are usually established in places where recreational diving tourism is popular for a large part of the year, particularly if it is a significant part of the local economy.

Dive resorts usually start out small, catering for dive group of about ten divers booked by a single dive shop or agent from a remote area, so the group is often divers who are a social group at their place of origin. This allows the resort to accommodate the needs of that particular group. If the resort becomes popular, it will usually expand and may become the nucleus for development of the area as other service industries form around it.

== Services provided ==
The scuba diving tourism industry provides both tangible and intangible goods and services. The tangible component includes provision of equipment for rental and for sale, while intangibles include education and skill development, dive charter services and guide services on dives. These organisations are called recreational diving service providers, or dive centres. The standard EN 14467 / ISO 24803 specifies performance requirements for the service provider, and covers aspects of diver training and education, guided dives, and equipment rental, but not the supply of breathing gases, as this is usually covered by national legislation. All of these services are considered distinct.

=== Experiences ===
Retail dive centres provide dive charters, which may be shore or boat dived, dive guides and information on the local environment and ecology, and transportation to and from the dive sites, and may also provide accommodation and hospitality services to tourists, or act as their agents for these services.

==== Liveaboards and day boat dives ====
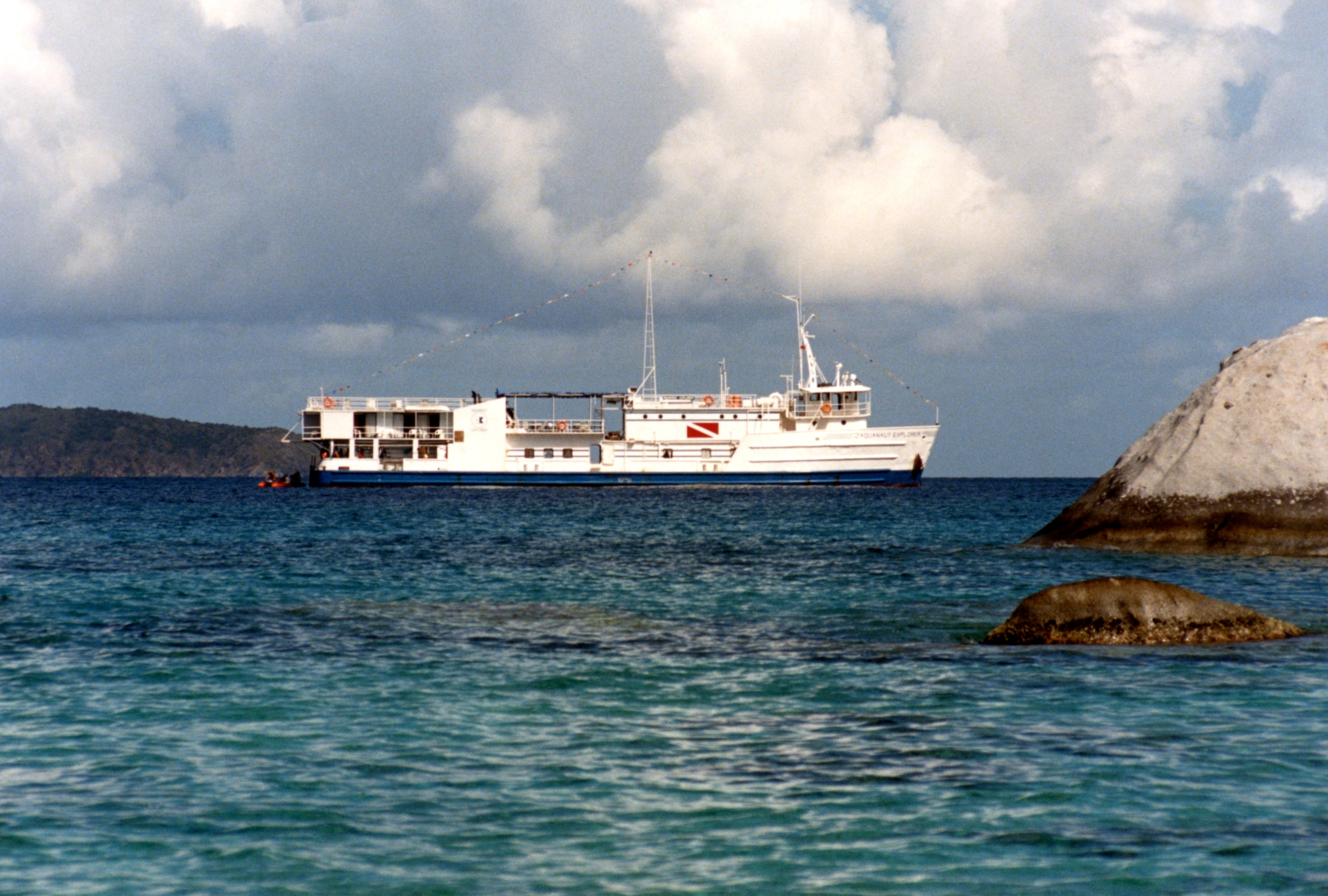
A liveaboard dive boat at anchor in the Virgin Islands

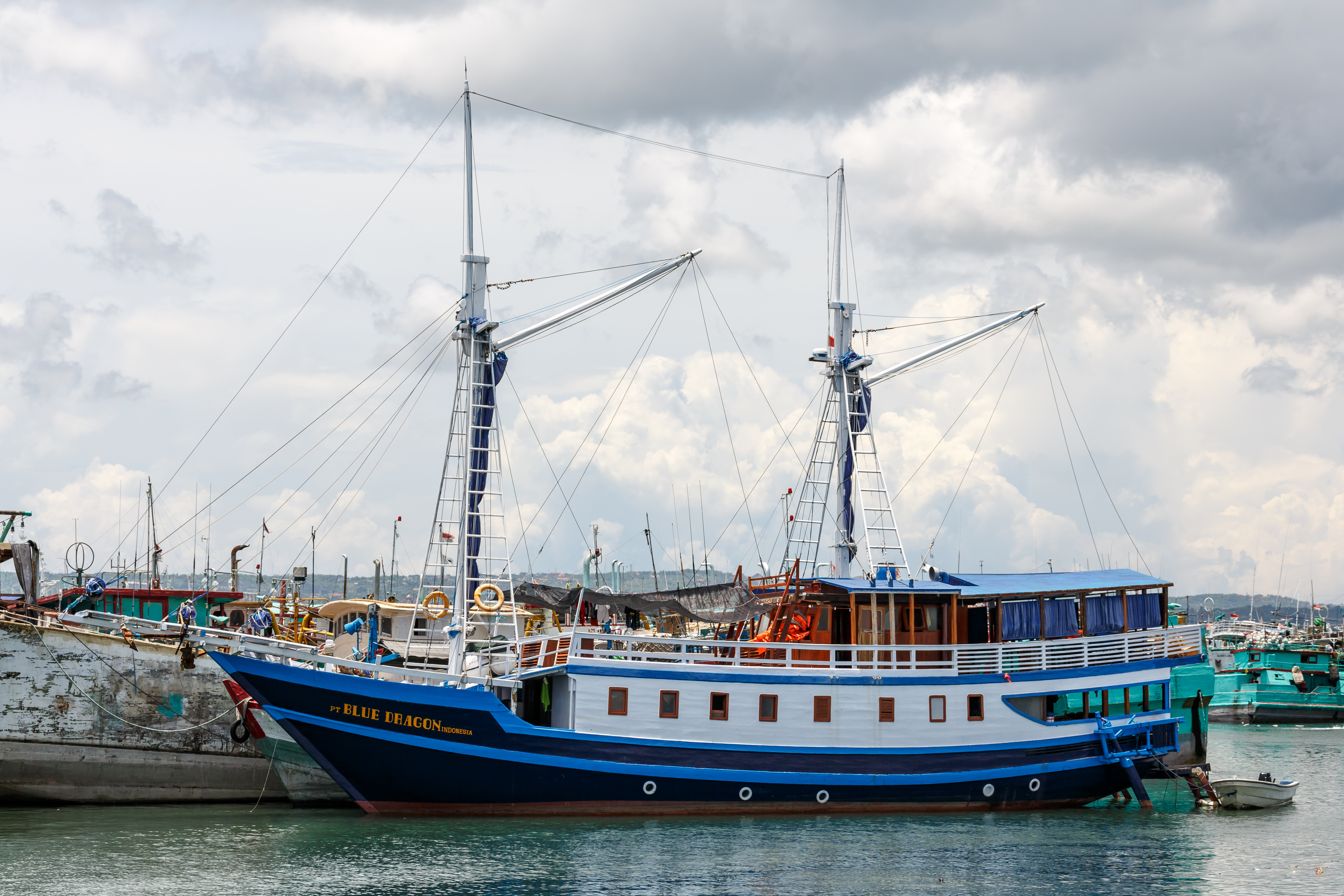
Liveaboard dive boat PT Blue Dragon at Benoa, Bali, Indonesia

A liveaboard dive boat is a mobile dive resort. The divers live and sleep on board and dive from the boat for periods of a few days to several weeks. A professional crew navigate and operate the boat and provide catering and other hotel services. Amenities may vary from basic to luxurious and the cost will be in proportion. In addition to the usual domestic facilities expected by hotel guests, the boat will have a diving air compressor and emergency oxygen. Some have gas blending facilities and a few even carry a recompression chamber.

The divers usually enter the water by stepping off a dive platform or the side of the main deck, and return to the boat using a ladder or a mechanical diver lift platform. Divers may also transfer to and from the dive site in a tender which is carried on, and launched from, the liveaboard boat. The tender may also be used to fetch divers separated from the main boat, and for shore excursions where there are no docking facilities.

day boat and basic boat dives may be provided through a land based dive resort, a dive shop, or booked directly with the boar operator. Facilities range from catered with multiple dives to basic transport to and from the site. Much depends on the distance to the site and expected sea and weather conditions.

A day boat would generally provide shelter from the weather and spray while in transit, and be used to transport divers to more than one dive-site during the same day, or multiple dives at the same site, with surface rest and refreshment periods between them. Smaller boats are more usually used when the distance to the dive site is short, and only one dive is intended. Facilities are likely to provide sitting space and a place to sore the scuba set and basic gear. It is common for the diver to travel wearing the diving suit. Since the boat needs only a small amount of space for each diver, it can be smaller and faster than larger boats, or be optimised for surf or slipway launches where there are no convenient harbours. Protection from the weather on fast boats is likely to be the diving suit, sometimes with a windbreaker worn over it, and a hat for the sun, but this will depend on weather conditions.

=== Safety ===
Historically, scuba diving was considered a relatively high risk activity, but this perception has been modified by the developments in equipment, training and service provision. Medical support services and local availability of decompression chambers and on-board medical oxygen for first aid has increased, improving the management of diving accidents and reducing the risk of permanent injury. Recompression facilities for treating serious diving injuries are not often available, even in first world countries.

Prudent service providers will check a client's certification cards and log to ensure the diver has been assessed as competent to dive sites similar to those booked, and may require the diver to demonstrate relevant skills in a checkout dive. Where skills are not of a standard required for safe diving, or environmentally responsible diving, the diver may be requested to take part in remedial training.

=== Equipment ===
The dive tourism industry tends to provide rental equipment to travelling divers more than equipment sales and service, but those aspects are considered valuable adjuncts. Scuba equipment is relatively heavy, and some components (scuba cylinders and diving weights) are not economically transportable by air, and may be included in the cost of a dive. Regulators, wet-suits, masks and fins are more personal equipment, and may be brought by the diver or rented, so a fairly large stock and where applicable, range of sizes is necessary to be able to rent equipment to all customers at a given time. Cameras and dive computers are usually owned by the diver, though entry-level examples may be available for hire at some dive centres. Some equipment manufacturers and distributors encourage exclusive provision of their products through financial incentives, and the range of spares and tools for servicing is affected by the range of equipment stocked, so the range of equipment available may be limited.

=== Diver training ===
There is a large market for diver training while on vacation. Most parts of the world do not have desirable local recreational dive sites, and many divers choose to combine training with a vacation to an area of popular dive sites. Sites suitable for entry-level training often differ considerably from sites which feature as highly desirable for scenic dives and high biodiversity, and unskilled beginners are necessarily kept away from deeper sites with more challenging conditions for their own safety and the protection of the often fragile ecosystems. Specialist wreck diving, cave diving and low environmental impact diving courses are usually available where the local sites are associated with requirements for these certifications.

The Universal Referral Program (URP) is a system intended to facilitate completion of training for open water recreational scuba diving students who intend to do their training dives at a place different from the venue for the theory and confined water training. More specifically, it allows inter agency referral - the referral instructor is not necessarily a member of the same certification agency as the initiating instructor.

Refresher training

=== Specialisation training ===
Training in several specialisations, particularly in technical diving, has become popular as tourism adjuncts because of the venue requiring a specific skill set for access to the sites.

- Cave diving
- Sidemount diving
- Rebreather diving
- Deep wreck and wreck penetration diving

Other specialisation training is more optional, as the specific certification is not strictly required, such as boat diving, night diving or drift diving, which are specialties with certification in some agencies' training options, but considered an integral part of core skill certification by others.

== Environmental impact ==
During the 20th century recreational scuba diving was considered to have generally low environmental impact, and was consequently one of the activities permitted in most marine protected areas. Since the 1970s diving has changed from an elite activity to a more accessible recreation, marketed to a very wide demographic. To some extent better equipment has been substituted for more rigorous training, and the reduction in perceived risk has shortened minimum training requirements by several training agencies. Training has concentrated on an acceptable risk to the diver, and paid less attention to the environment. The increase in the popularity of diving and in tourist access to sensitive ecological systems has led to the recognition that the activity can have significant environmental consequences.

Scuba diving has grown in popularity during the 21st century, as is shown by the number of certifications issued worldwide, which has increased to about 23 million by 2016 at about one million per year. Scuba diving tourism is a growth industry, and it is necessary to consider environmental sustainability, as the expanding impact of divers can adversely affect the marine environment in several ways, and the impact also depends on the specific environment. Tropical coral reefs are more easily damaged by poor diving skills than some temperate reefs, where the environment is more robust due to rougher sea conditions and fewer fragile, slow-growing organisms. The same pleasant sea conditions that allow development of relatively delicate and highly diverse ecologies also attract the greatest number of tourists, including divers who dive infrequently, exclusively on vacation and never fully develop the skills to dive in an environmentally friendly way. Several studies have found the main reason for contact by inexperienced divers to be poor buoyancy control, and that damage to reefs by divers can be minimized by modifying the behavior of those divers.

Diver impact on subtropical, and particularly temperate reefs is less researched than tropical reefs. The perception is that these reefs are less vulnerable than tropical reefs and the sessile species are less vulnerable to diver impact. Diver contact with the bottom is also prevalent on temperate reefs – one of the main forms mentioned is fin contact with the bottom sediment, raising particulate material into the water column and degrading visibility.

Three aspects of responsible diving behaviour have been identified:

- Safe diving behaviour, which is largely a matter of competence, use of appropriate equipment for the dive, use of equipment in good working order, staying within the bounds of personal competence and adherence to procedures known to reduce risk.
- Good buoyancy control and trim, the ability to remain at a controlled distance from the benthos, and to do so without contacting it. This is a skill often neglected in entry level recreational diver training, but often offered as an extra course, (eg: PADI Peak performance buoyancy), in training systems that have been planned around minimising the duration of individual courses, and where the entry-level training concentrates on providing the minimum skills acceptable for the safety of the diver in the conditions where the training is done. This has convenience advantages to the diver, and financial advantages to the training provider, but as most recreational divers never progress in training beyond entry level, they are often left marginally competent, and may not get enough practice to improve.
- Non-contact behaviour, the voluntary avoidance of contact which may damage the environment. This behaviour is only effective if good buoyancy control and trim are available, and it requires situational awareness which may not be sufficiently developed in a novice, particularly in an unfamiliar environment, and using unfamiliar equipment, often exacerbated by the use of a camera, which can distract the diver from detail awareness of their surroundings.

The impact of recreational scuba diving on recreational dive values and the cultural heritage of shipwrecks has been found to comprise four basic types:

- The removal of artifacts and associated disturbance to wreck sites,
- Direct contact with wrecks and the benthic biota living on them by divers and their equipment, causing direct physical damage
- Exhaled air bubbles trapped inside the wreckage, which can dislodge loose deposits and accelerate corrosion
- Impact damage by anchors of dive boats, considered by some researchers to be the most damaging form of impact associated with recreational wreck diving.

=== Strategies for sustainable use management ===
Several methodologies have been developed with the intention of minimising the environmental impact of divers on coral reefs

- Carrying capacity approach. where the number of divers is restricted. This also limits tourism income from the region. Sustainable diver carrying capacity is influenced by factors which vary between sites.
- Limits of acceptable change. This model uses quantitative limits on change defined in specific management objectives for a site using an established baseline.
- Percentile approach, where capacity is limited by comparison with damage at non-dived control sites
- Restricting recreational divers to delimited locations, which usually concentrates divers and damage along diving trails. This creates paths of degraded reef through the more pristine areas, and will cause dissatisfaction as the trail degrades further.
- Regulating the type of diving equipment allowed, generally accessories which are thought to increase reef contacts, such as gloves and cameras. These restrictions are understandably unpopular with photographers, and may be applied to both divers who manage to avoid contact and those who do not.
- Changing the methods by which the industry provides services. Closer supervision and intervention by dive guides can reduce diver contact rates where the divers are sufficiently skilled to modify their behaviour during the dive. A pre-dive briefing on responsible behaviour, regulations and environmental values can reduce the rate of diver impacts where the divers are sufficiently competent to avoid contact. More effective interventions occur when the number of divers per guide is low.
- Encouraging or enforcing competence of divers in low impact diving as a precondition for diving in sensitive areas. This has been identified as an effective way of reducing diver contact.

== Economics ==
Scuba diving is an equipment intensive activity. Significant capital outlay is required to establish a retail outlet with the expected range of equipment and filling facilities. Dive boats are a large to very large capital expense, and running costs and crew salaries can be considerable. There are also health and safety aspects to be considered, both for the operator and the customer, as high pressure filling equipment is used to provide breathing air which will be used in a hostile environment. Adequate quality control is necessary to avoid providing a harmful product. The cost of qualifying as a diving instructor is significant in time and money, and annual registration fees are a required.

=== Sustainability ===
Three factors have been identified as important in economic sustainability:

- Environmental awareness and conservation: The regions that are the most popular destinations for most recreational diver tourism are also those with the most fragile and vulnerable ecosystems. Divers have a tendency to choose their destinations based on reputation for a quality experience, which is largely related to the state of the ecosystem. Word gets around when a region's dive sites are deteriorating, and this adversely affects bookings and income. For sustainable business over the long term, the local service providers and communities need to ensure that the impact on the ecology is sustainable. To a large extent this involves ensuring that clients are competent to dive the local sites without damaging delicate organisms, which often requires a level of skill greater than the diver can sustain by diving only a few times a year.
- Service delivery and customer satisfaction: Depending on location, it may be difficult or impossible to consistently provide a satisfactory dive experience, as weather and sea conditions may not be predictable over the longer term. Consequently the type of diving tourism can vary considerably by region, with service providers in some places only able to confirm bookings a few days in advance, while in others a cancellation is the exception, and this may vary seasonally. Customer satisfaction is linked to expectations, and providers catering to a repeat market may be less likely to take the boat out on a day when conditions are forecast to be marginal by local standards.
- Sustainable business management. (Return on investment, maintaining reputation, maintaining equipment, compliance with safety requirements etc)

=== Economic risks ===
International risks to the diving tourism industry include terrorism, economic recessions and global disease epidemics. Domestic risks within the borders of specific countries may include increased crime rates, and political instability.

Environmental degradation, partly due to the impact of recreational diving on the environment, where pollution and direct damage by divers have been recorded, and the effects of natural disasters and climate change such as increased water temperature causing coral bleaching are threatening the industry, as divers are less inclined to visit areas where these problems have been reported. Overexploitation by fishing and illegal extraction have led to some sites being closed and permit systems introduced, sometimes limiting the numbers of divers that may visit an area in a given time interval.

The global economic downturn has reduced spending on expensive leisure activities, reducing the income of tourism destinations, including scuba diving charters and diving schools, and political instability deters visitors to a region

Liability issues can be managed by the use of waivers, adherence to industry best standards, and public liability insurance.

A large proportion of divers visiting tropical coral reef destinations are international travellers – circumstances that may induce them not to travel, or not to visit a particular region can have a strong influence on the viability of a diving operation. A study on diving tourism in East Africa showed that the major environmental risks for that region are overfishing and marine pollution. The economic risks are mainly price inflation and recessions, the social risks include global disease epidemics and international crime, and political instability and onerous visa regulations are the major political risks.

== Demographics ==
Recreational diving tourists appear to be male-dominated, with an average age in the mid thirties, a college education, and higher than average income, which is in keeping with the relatively high costs of equipment, training and travel.

The general population of American scuba diving participants are on average wealthier and better educated than the general population, and have a higher participation than average in individual and team sports, and extreme sports. Nearly 46% participate in running or jogging, and 36% swim for fitness. The DAN medical emergency line and fatality and injury monitoring program have reported that some divers get injured as a consequence of inadequate physical fitness.

A study to identify differences between local scuba divers and visitors in Florida showed that visitors had less certification and experience but spent more on scuba, compared to local resident divers. Cluster analysis identified four groups of scuba divers:

- Fun-seeking belongers: Divers with a strong affiliation for group belonging, looking for fun and excitement, enjoyed diving in varied locations, enjoyed stimulating encounters and considered bonding with other divers important. They self-identified as belonging to the scuba community and sought to associate with other divers with similar attitudes. They tended to have more diving experience and spent more on scuba activities. Mostly males, and the majority unmarried.
- Actualizers: Divers focused on challenge, self-recognition, and self-esteem values, likely to consider certification important and consider that overcoming the challenges is important to their self-image. Represented by more females than other groups, and lower income and expenditure on scuba activities.
- Inner-circles: People who perceived diving as an opportunity to make new friends, and spend time with family and friends. Image as a diver relatively unimportant, and not driven to be part of the scuba diving community. Mostly married, male, well-educated, with less diving experience than average.
- Moderates: Divers more likely to do a single dive in a day, and less focused on the characteristics typical of the other groups.

== Legal risk and liability ==
Participation in recreational diving implies acceptance of the inherent risks of the activity. Diver training includes training in procedures known to reduce these risks to a level considered acceptable by the certification agency, and issue of certification implies that the agency accepts that the instructor has assessed the diver to be sufficiently competent in these skills at the time of assessment and to be sufficiently informed to accept the associated risks. Certification relates to a set of skills and knowledge defined by the associated training standard, which also specifies the limitations on the scope of diving activities for which the diver is deemed competent. These limitations involve depth, environment and equipment that the diver has been trained to use.

Waivers and release
The waiver is intended as a legal defense against lawsuits claiming ordinary negligence by the operator. The diver acknowledges understanding and acceptance of the risks inherent to scuba diving. The waiver may also require the diver to follow recognized safe diving practices. By signing the waiver the diver agrees not to sue the operator for injuries and damage due to ordinary negligence relating to the diving activity. It will generally not be enforceable for gross negligence and events beyond the normal scope of diving.

Medical statement
The medical statement is intended to draw the diver's attention to the range of medical conditions that may increase the risk of injury during a dive. Failure to disclose a known medical condition which is then the cause of an injury will usually disqualify the diver from legal compensation, and may also void an insurance claim. It also transfers responsibility for establishing fitness to dive from the operator to the diver.

== Marketing strategies ==
Marketing of scuba diving tourism is generally by advertising in specialist and general tourism magazines, both print and web based, at trade shows, on websites, and by personal communications from satisfied customers to their acquaintances with similar interests. Surveys have shown that personal communications are the most effective advertising, and depend on customer satisfaction. Diving fatalities can have serious adverse effects on the popularity of a destination and service provider, even when there is no fault established in an investigation, though this is usually a transient phenomenon.

=== Provision or facilitation of additional services ===
Scuba tourism services often provide additional services to occupy the clients during the times when they are not diving, either directly or through networking and collaboration with other local tourist services.

== See also ==
- Dive boat – Boat used for the support of scuba diving operations
- Dive guide (publication) – Travel guides for recreational diving
- Dive resort – Recreational diving service provider with accommodation
- Environmental impact of recreational diving – Effects of scuba diving on the underwater environment
- Liveaboard dive boat – Vessel providing support for diving tourists
- Introductory diving, also known as Resort diving, Try diving – Non-certification scuba diving experience
- Recreational diving – Diving for the purpose of leisure and enjoyment
- Recreational diving service provider – Tangible and intangible goods and services provision for recreational diving tourism
- Diver training referral system – System for allowing training to be completed by another instructor
- Refresher training – Training to update existing skills and knowledge
- Shark tourism – Tourism industry for viewing wild sharks
- Sinking ships for wreck diving sites – Scuttling old ships to produce artificial reefs
