= Diamond Reef System =

System for training divers in buoyancy

Diamond Reef System is a diving curriculum and safety program that uses a portable obstacle course to simulate reef structure for diver buoyancy skill training. It was founded by Peter Wallingford in 1989 to educate scuba divers on how to interact with coral reefs. The program was adopted by the Environmental Protection Agency and the National Oceanic and Atmospheric Administration.

== History ==
In 1989, Peter Wallingford started a conservation organization called "Friends of the Reef" in response to customers of his store complaining about the state of the coral reefs. He created an underwater obstacle course for buoyancy-control training, which was made of PVC pipe hoops shaped like diamonds. The program was adopted by the National Oceanic Atmospheric Administration in 1989. By 1991, Diamond Reef System had developed into an instructional program under the company, Buoyancy Training Systems, Inc. Diamond Reef System was adopted into the Environmental Protection Agency's divers program in 1991. It also received recognition from the University of California at Los Angeles diving program, University of North Carolina diving program and National Association of Underwater Instructors.

=== Description ===
Diamond Reef hoop shape and construction

The obstacle course kit for buoyancy training includes a set of buoyant hoops, each with a cord for tethering to a weight on the bottom, and a line holder to store the cord and adjust its operating length. Several alternative hoop geometries are covered in the patents (circular, triangular, octagonal and rectangular are mentioned), but the one recommended and generally used is a square in a diamond-shaped orientation, tethered by a corner, allowing the open corner to float upwards. This is considered by the designer to be the most efficient shape considering the diver and equipment passing through the hoop. It also minimizes the amount of material and work required for an effective target, and the diamond configuration has better underwater stability than the other configurations. Standard sized diamond hoops include 39 inches (1.0 m) and 48 inches (1.2 m) side lengths. These hoops can be made from any suitable material, but 1 inch (25 mm) diameter PVC pipe has been found adequate.

The target hoop is assembled from straight tubular sections with open ends connected by right angle elbows and the unconnected ends sealed by plugs or caps. The assembly can be glued together or held together by internal shock cord, allowing dislocation of the joints for compact storage. The unconnected corner is generally deployed as the high point of the hoop and it allows a diver to escape upwards if unable to pass through the hoop.

=== Setup ===
Slalom, escalator and rollercoaster obstacle course layouts can be laid out using the kit components. These courses are intended to be set up for buoyancy training in quiet, safe water with little or no current and more than fifteen feet of visibility. The recommended minimum depth of the water is 30 feet (9 m), allowing for a 10 feet (3 m) stop as the shallowest part of the obstacle course. A standard set comprises five identical hoops.

- The slalom course can include direction changes between sequential hoops which are set up in a row with the cords adjusted to keep the hoops at the same depth, preferably about 9 feet (3 m) apart and three ft from the bottom. This is intended to train divers' ability to remain 3 feet (1 m) above a coral reef.
- The escalator course includes an increase or decrease in depth between sequential hoops. Preferably, the hoops are stationed about 9 feet (3 m) apart and 3 feet (0.9 m), 7 feet (2.1 m), 11 feet (3.4 m), 15 feet (4.6 m) and 19 feet (5.8 m) feet above the bottom. This layout is for practicing gradual ascents and descents.
- The rollercoaster course includes both increases and decreases of depth between sequential hoops. Preferably the hoops are set up by arranging with the depths used in the escalator course aligning them in a row such that the successive hoops are deeper and shallower from one to the next (for example: 3 → 2 → 4 → 1 → 5). This layout is for practicing controlled alternating ascents and descents.

== Procedures ==
The system can be used for training and assessing diver buoyancy control and maneuvering skills.
