= Gulf of Aqaba =

Large gulf at the northern tip of the Red Sea

- Gulf of Eilat
- خَلِيج الْعَقَبَة (Arabic); מפרץ אילת (Hebrew)
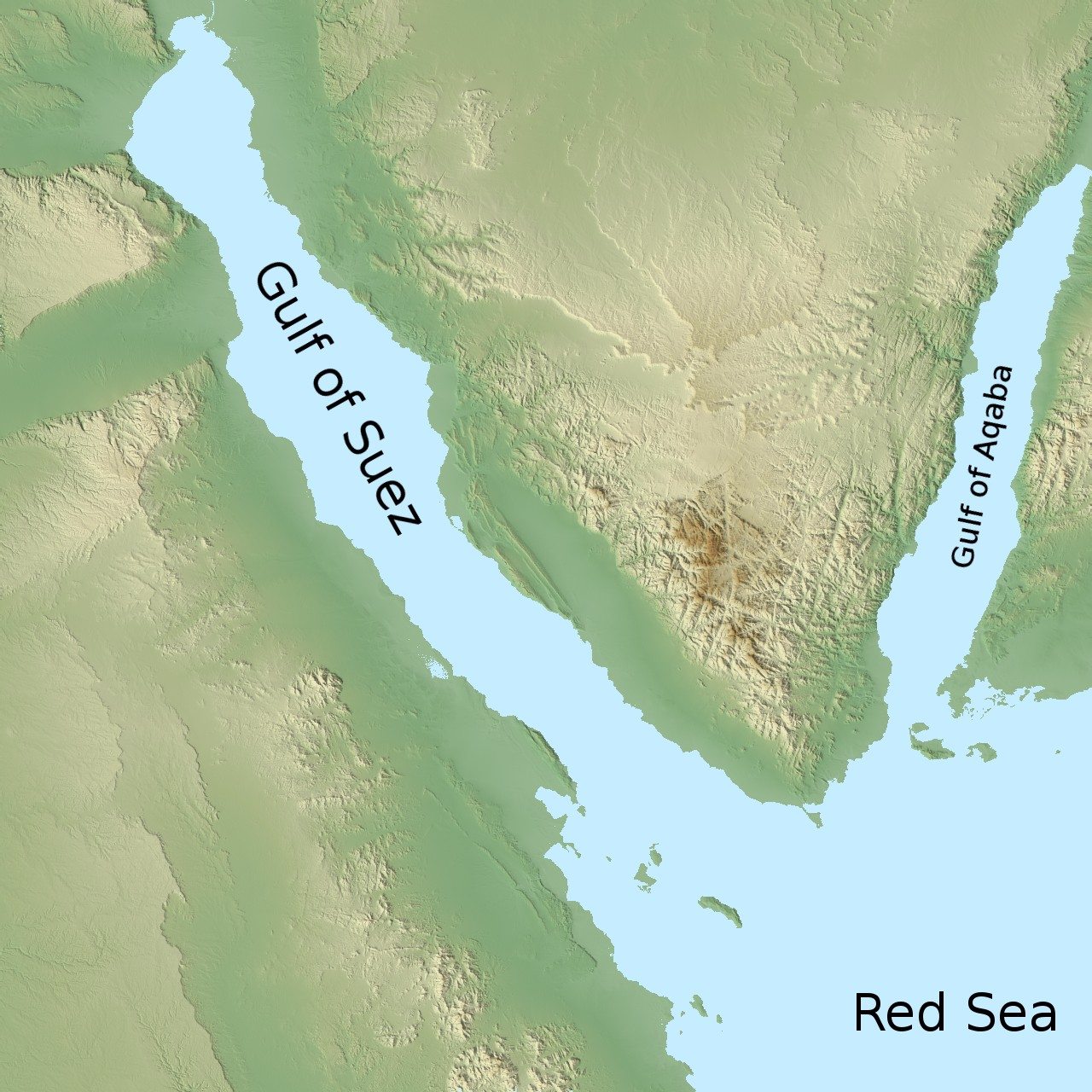
- The Sinai Peninsula with the Gulf of Aqaba to the east and the Gulf of Suez to the west

- Location within Egypt
- Location: West Asia
- Coordinates: 28°45′N 34°45′E
- Type: Gulf
- Primary inflows: Red Sea
- Basin countries: Egypt, Israel, Jordan, and Saudi Arabia
- Max. length: 188 km (117 mi)
- Max. width: 24 km (15 mi)
- Surface area: 3,680 km^{2} (1,420 sq mi)
- Max. depth: 1,850 m (6,070 ft)
- Settlements: Aqaba, Eilat, Taba, Haql, Sharm El Sheikh

The Gulf of Aqaba (Arabic: خَلِيج الْعَقَبَة, romanized: Khalīj al-ʿAqaba) or Gulf of Eilat (Hebrew: מפרץ אילת, romanized: Mifrátz Eilát) is a large gulf at the northern tip of the Red Sea, southeast of the Sinai Peninsula, and west of the Arabian Peninsula. Its coastline is divided among four countries: Egypt, Israel, Jordan, and Saudi Arabia.

== Geography ==
The gulf is east of the Sinai Peninsula and west of the Arabian Peninsula. With the Gulf of Suez to the west, it extends from the northern portion of the Red Sea. It reaches a maximum depth of 1,850 metres (6,070 ft) in its central area: the Gulf of Suez is significantly wider but less than 100 m (330 ft) deep.

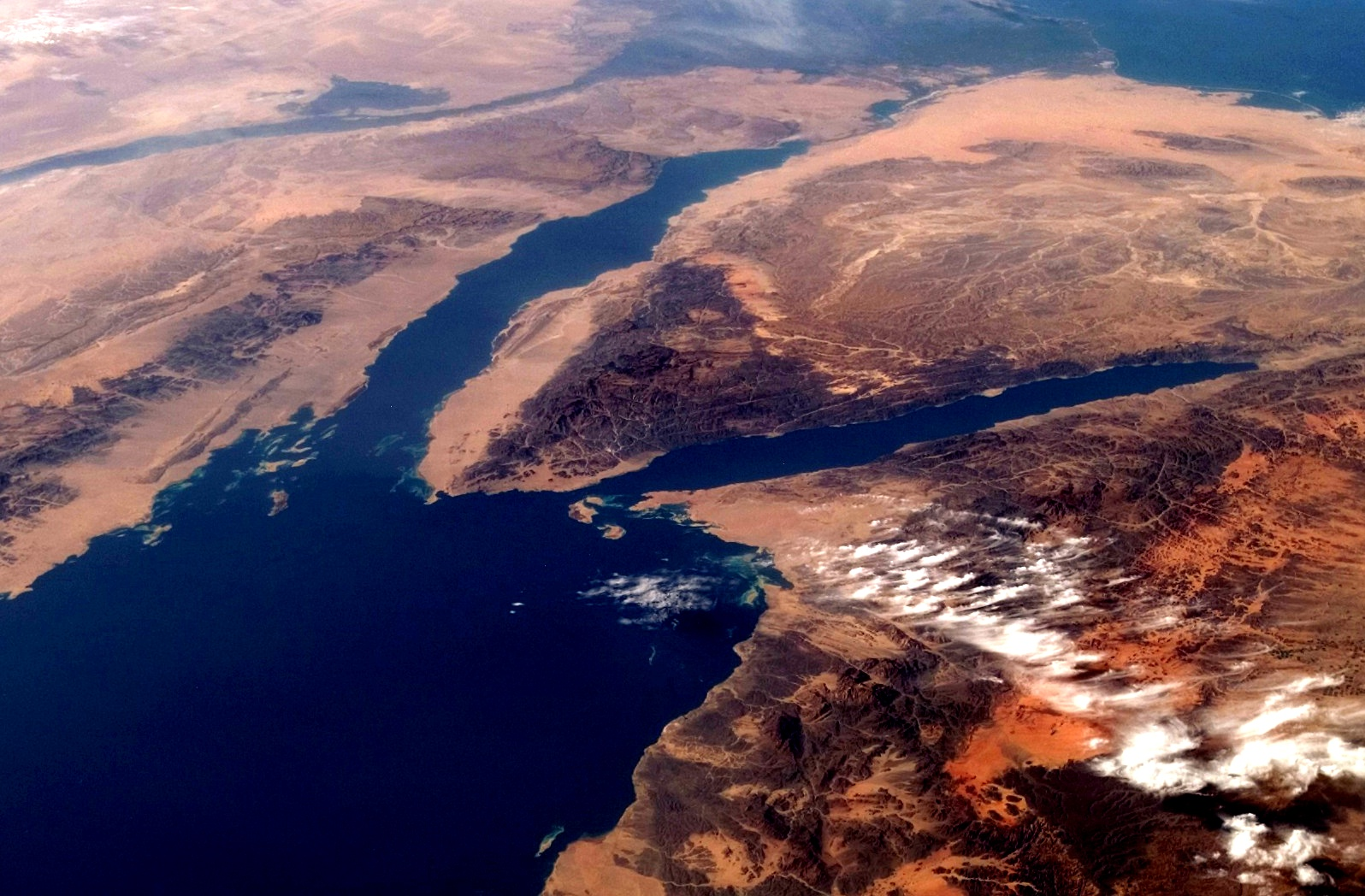
The Sinai Peninsula separating the Gulf of Suez to the west and the Gulf of Aqaba, to the east.

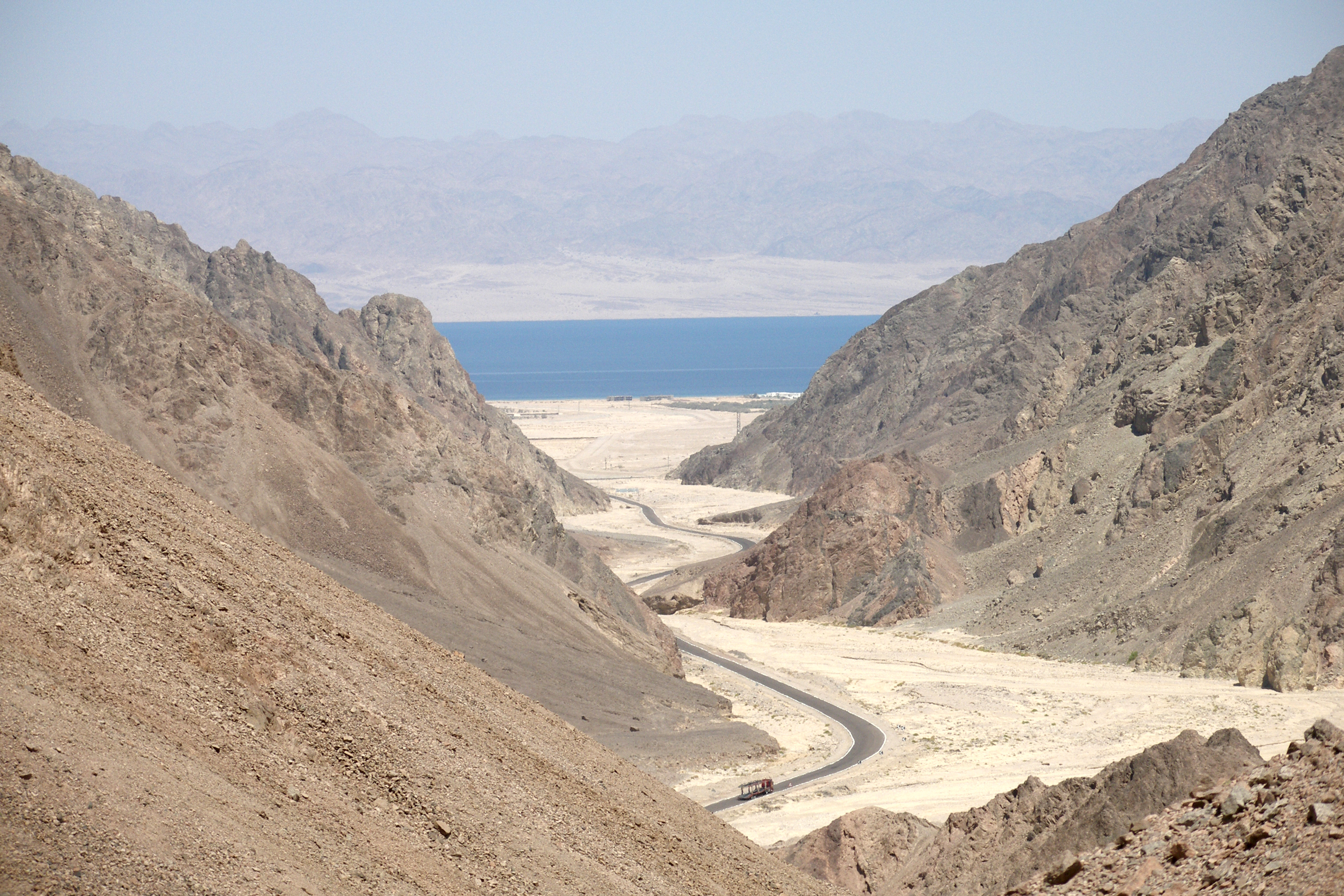
View of the Gulf of Aqaba near Nuweiba, Egypt.

The gulf measures 24 km (15 mi) at its widest point and stretches some 160 km (100 mi) north from the Straits of Tiran to where Israel meets Egypt and Jordan.

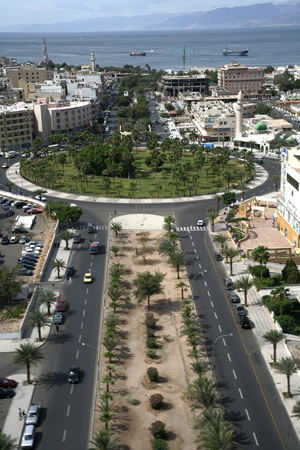
The city of Aqaba is the largest on the gulf

Like the coastal waters of the Red Sea, the gulf is one of the world's premier sites for diving. The area is especially rich in coral and other marine biodiversity and has both accidental shipwrecks and vessels deliberately sunk in an effort to provide a habitat for marine organisms and bolster the local dive tourism industry.

=== Cities and commercial significance ===
At this northern end of the gulf are three important cities: Taba in Egypt, Eilat in Israel, and Aqaba in Jordan. As the only point of access to the Red Sea for Israel and Jordan, the gulf has held and continues to hold commercial and strategic importance, especially. In the case of Israel, these few kilometers' access to the gulf were included in the original 1947 UN Palestine Partition Plan and became crucially important for trade during times of hostility with its neighbors (e.g. when Egypt closed access to the Suez Canal), while Jordan's 26 kilometres (16 mi) shoreline on the gulf is the only part of Jordan's borders preventing it from being completely landlocked. The Gulf is also home to popular resorts for tourists seeking to enjoy the warm climate.

Further south, Haql is the largest Saudi Arabian city on the gulf. On Sinai, Sharm el-Sheikh and Dahab are the major centres.

The largest population center is Aqaba, with a population of 148,398 (2015), followed by Eilat with a population of 50,724 (2020).

=== Extent ===
The International Hydrographic Organization defines the southern limit of the gulf as "A line running from Ràs al Fasma Southwesterly to Requin Island (27°57′N 34°36′E) through Tiran Island to the Southwest point thereof and thence Westward on a parallel (27°54'N) to the coast of the Sinaï Peninsula".

== Geology ==
The gulf is one of two gulfs created by the Sinai Peninsula's bifurcation of the northern Red Sea, the Gulf of Suez lying to the west of the peninsula and the Gulf of Aqaba to its east. Geologically, the gulf forms the southern end of the Dead Sea Transform. It contains three small pull-apart basins, the Elat Deep, Aragonese Deep and Dakar Deep, formed between four left lateral strike-slip fault segments. Movement on one of these faults caused the 1995 Gulf of Aqaba earthquake.

== History ==
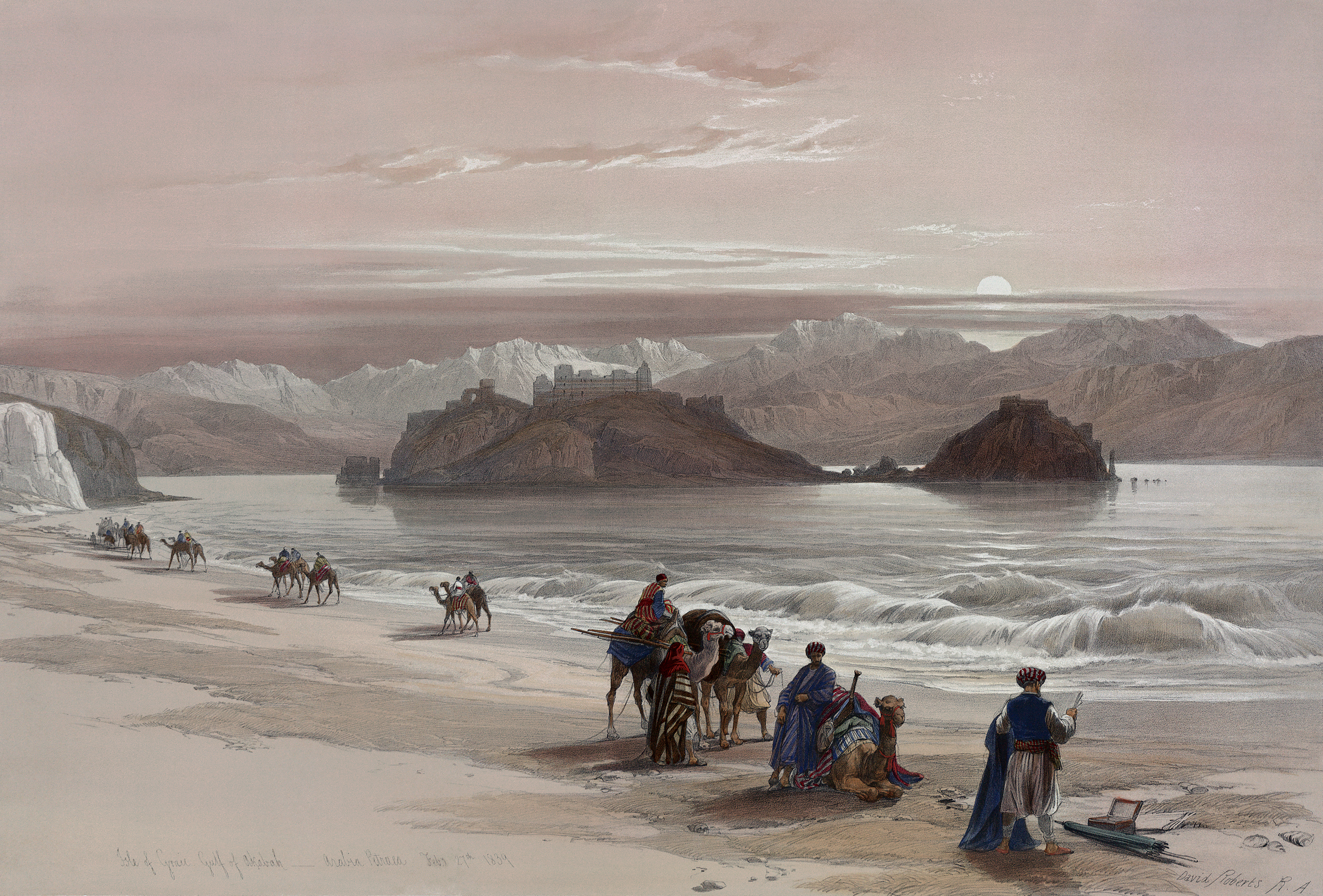
"Isle of Graia, Gulf of Akabah Arabia Petraea", 1839 lithograph of a trade caravan in The Holy Land, Syria, Idumea, Arabia, Egypt, and Nubia, by Louis Haghe from an original by David Roberts.

Trade across the Red Sea between Thebes' port of Elim and Elath at the head of the gulf is documented as early as the Fourth Dynasty of Egypt. Expeditions crossing the Red Sea and heading south to Punt are mentioned in the fifth, the sixth, the eleventh, the twelfth and the eighteenth dynasties of Egypt, when Hatshepsut built a fleet to support the trade and journeyed south to Punt in a six-month voyage. Thebes used Nubian gold or Nub from her conquests south into Kush to facilitate the purchase of frankincense, myrrh, bitumen, natron, juniper oil, linen, and copper amulets for the mummification industry at Karnak. Egyptian settlements near Timna at the head of the gulf date to the Eighteenth dynasty of Egypt.

At the northern edge, the ancient city of Ayla (in present-day Aqaba) was a commercial hub for the Nabateans. The Romans built the Via Traiana Nova, which joined the King's Highway at Aqaba and connected Africa to Asia and the Levant and Red Sea shipping.

Aqaba was a major Ottoman port, connected to Damascus and Medina by the Hejaz railway. During World War I, the Battle of Aqaba was the key battle that ended a 500-year Ottoman rule over the region of Syria.

== Fauna ==
In general, the fauna in the Red Sea represents the fauna in the waters of the Indian Ocean, except that many species cannot penetrate it due to salinity and temperature limitations and some are only found in the southern part of the Red Sea. A large part of the species in the Red Sea are endemic and the proportion of several groups reaches about 30%. It is possible that some of them developed during the Tethys Sea period. The endemic species are more suitable to the conditions in the Red Sea and the Gulf of Aqaba and therefore thrive there more than the oceanic species.

== Tourism ==
The gulf is one of the most popular diving destinations in the world. About 250,000 dives are performed annually in Eilat's 11 km coastline, and diving represents 10% of the tourism income of this area.

The Landscape of Wadi Rum to the east of the northern edge of the gulf is a popular destination. Other destinations are the ruins of the iron-age civilization of Ayla in the city of Aqaba, the site of the World War I Battle of Aqaba, led by Lawrence of Arabia.

Whales, orcas, dolphins, dugongs, and whale sharks live in the gulf as well.

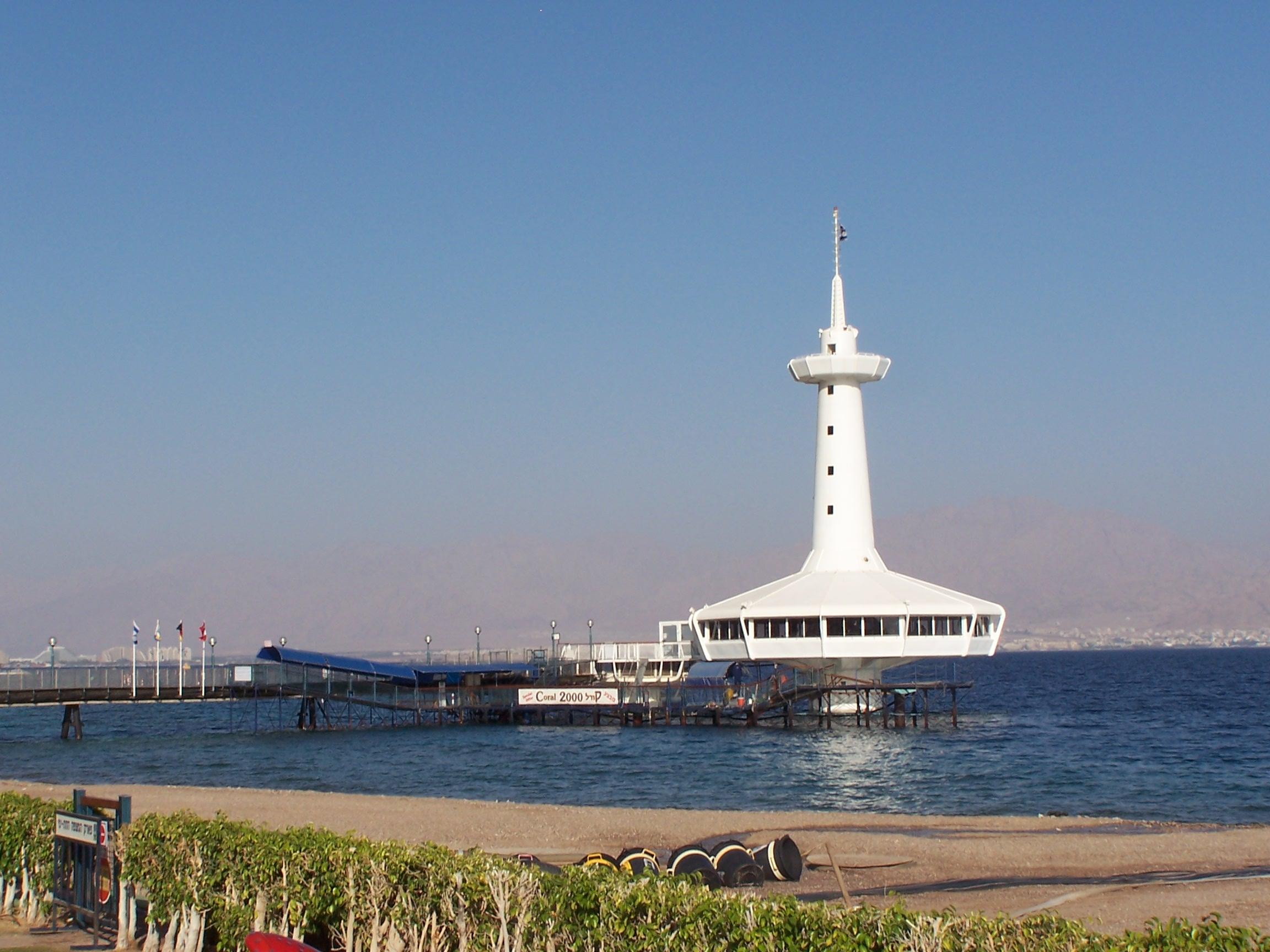
Coral World Underwater Observatory at Eilat

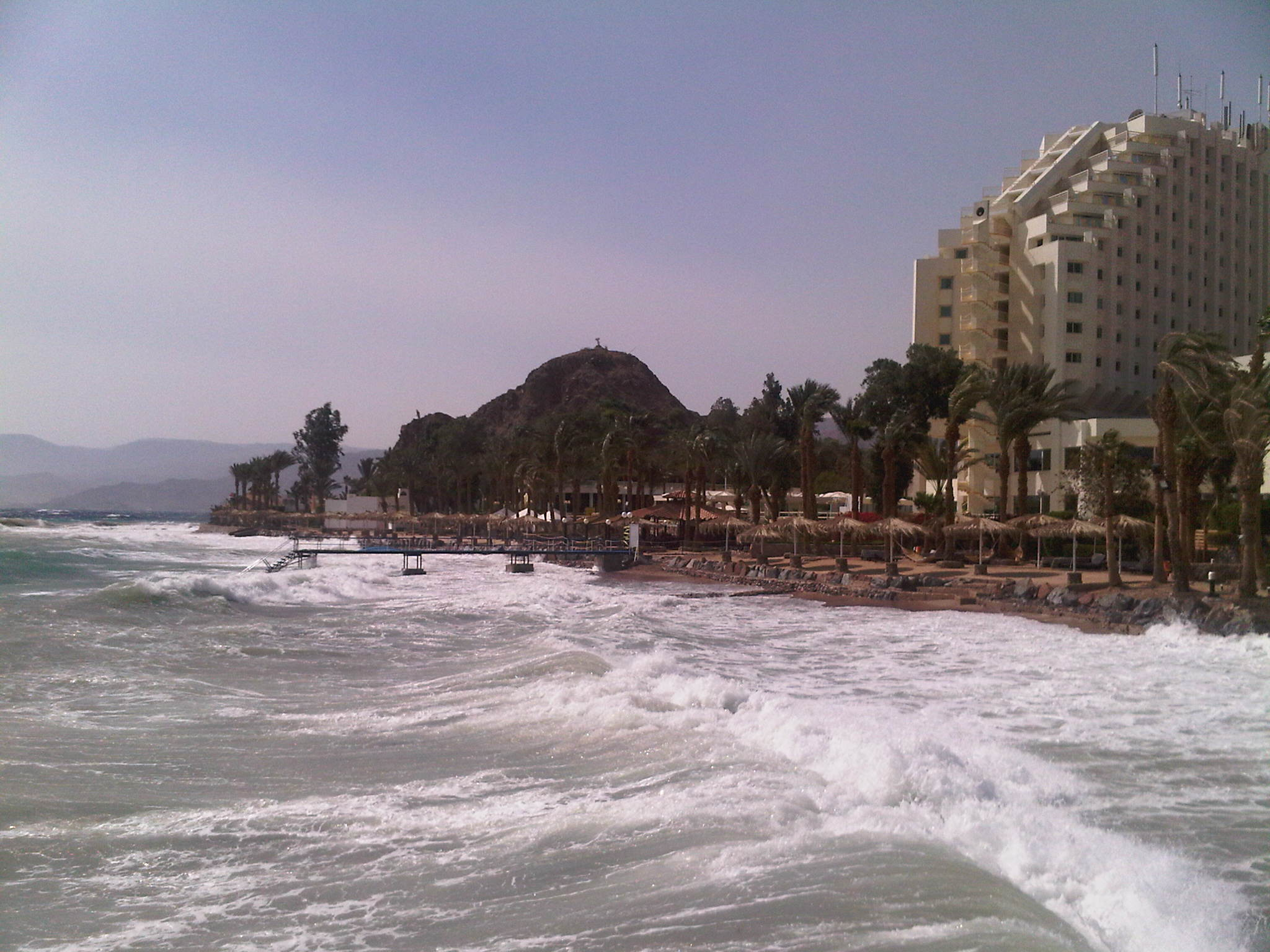
Taba beach

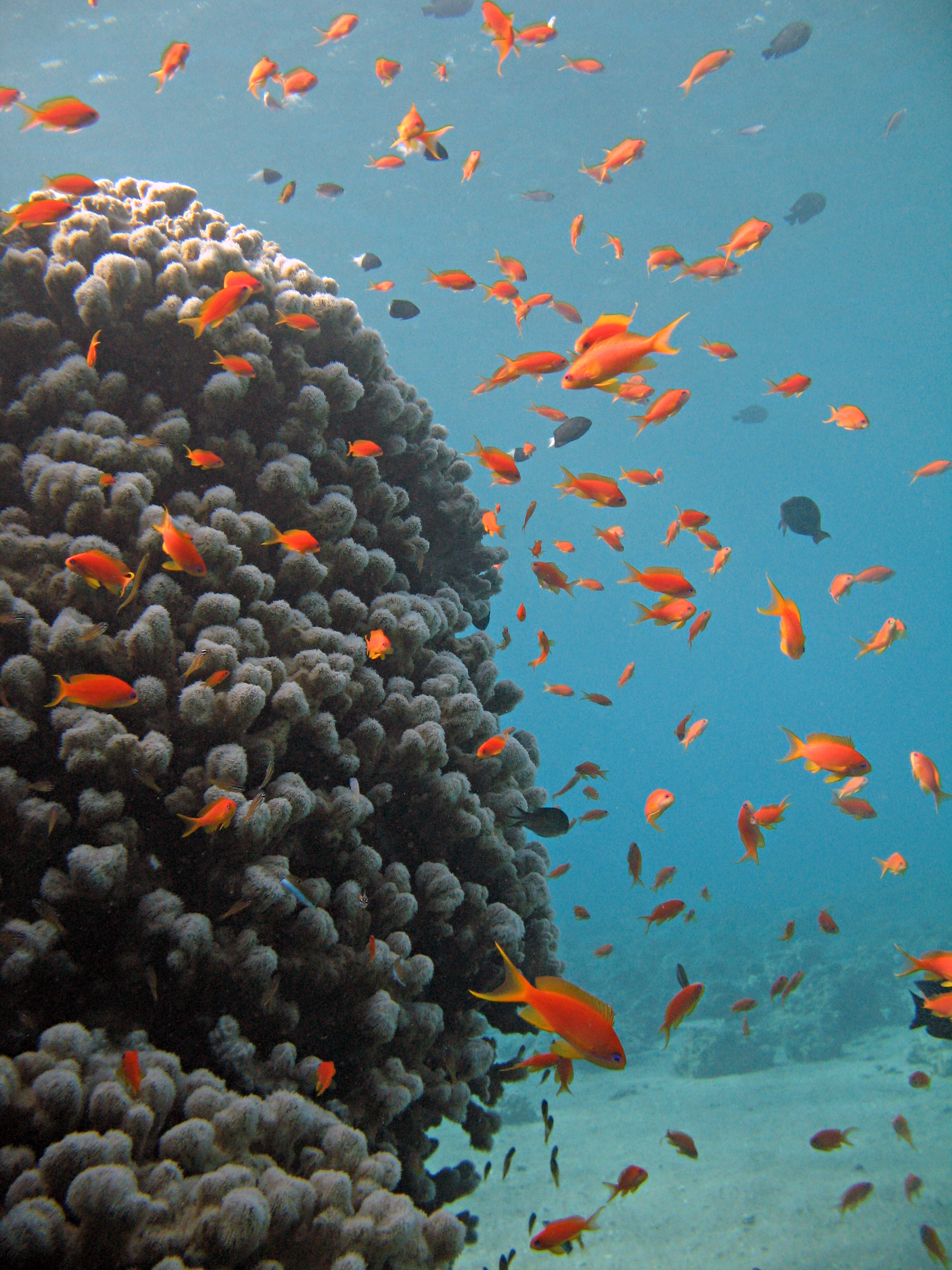
Red Sea coral and marine fish

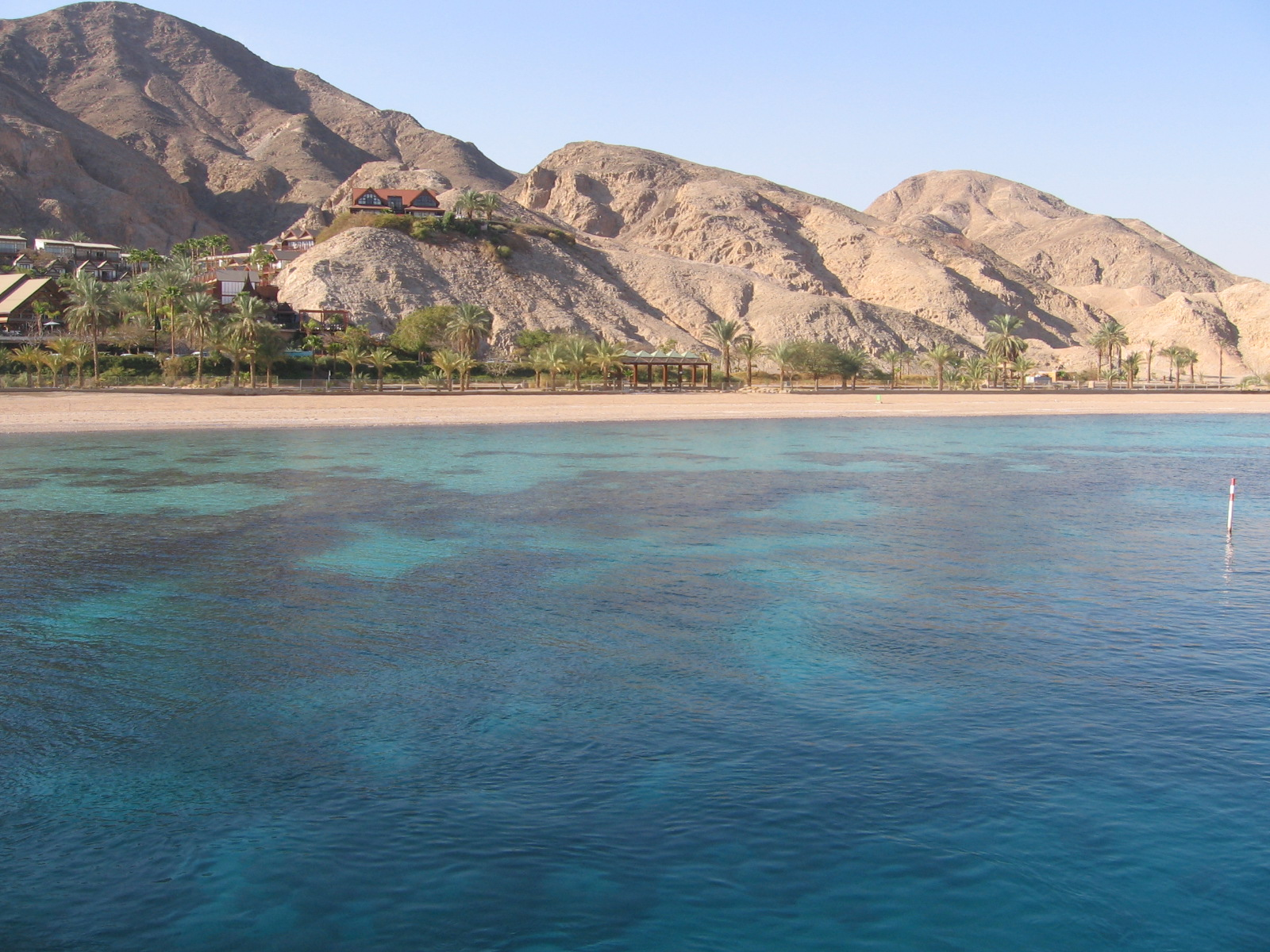
A resort near Eilat's Coral Beach

== See also ==
- Al Jawf Region/Tabuk Region
- Aqaba Governorate
- Israeli Diving Federation
- South Sinai Governorate
- Tourism in Egypt
- Tourism in Israel
- Tourism in Jordan
- Wadi Sayq/Khor Kharfot
