= Eilat's Coral Beach =

Northernmost coral reef on Earth, by the Eilat shore

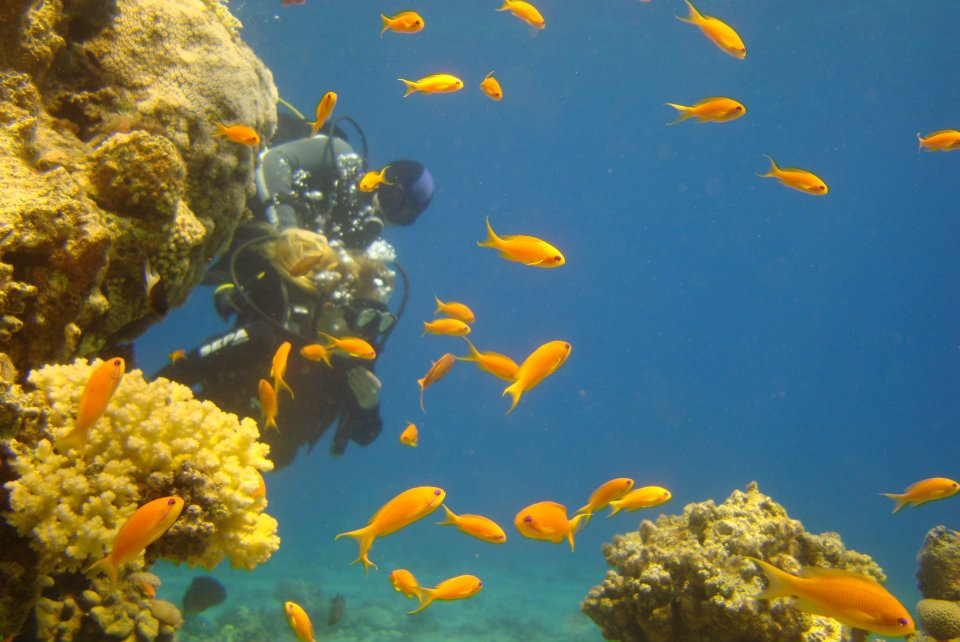
- Interactive map of Eilat's Coral Beach
- Location: Southern, Araba, Israel
- Nearest town: Eilat, Israel
- Coordinates: 29.508°N 34.922°E
- Length: 5 km (3.1 mi)
- Width: 7 km (4.3 mi)
- Established: 1964

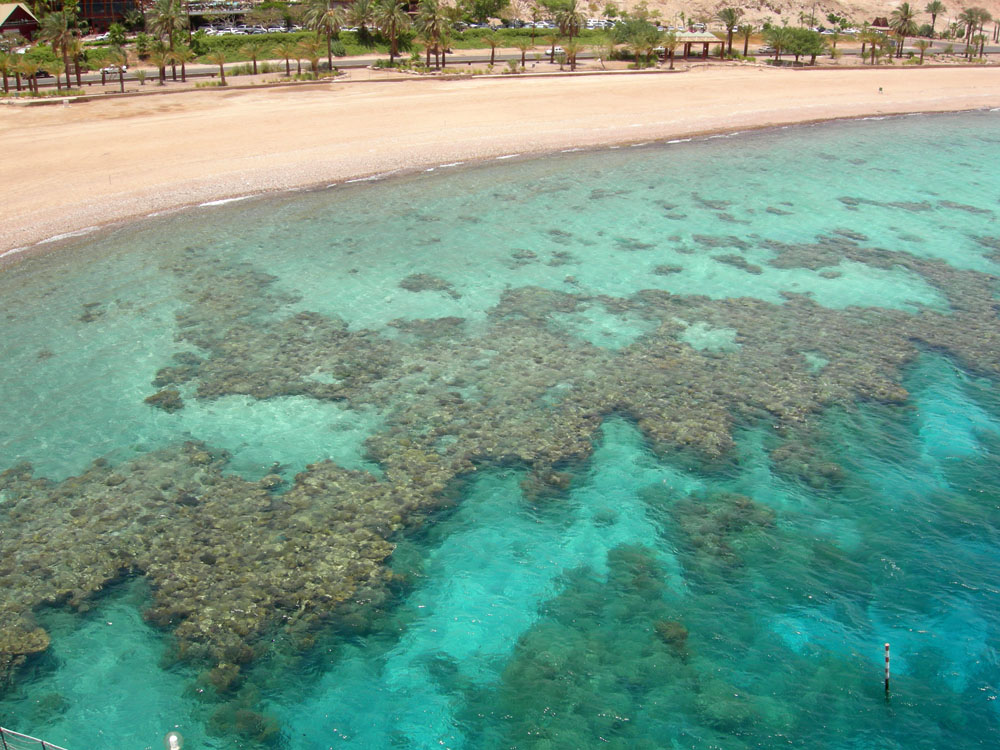
Coral reef by the Eilat shore

Eilat's Coral Beach Nature Reserve and Conservation area (Hebrew: שמורת טבע חוף האלמוגים) is a nature reserve and national park in the Red Sea, near the city of Eilat in Israel. It covers 1.2 kilometres (0.75 mi) of shore, and is the northernmost shallow water coral reef in the world, and possibly one of the more resilient to climate change.

It is popular for diving and research, and was founded by the Israel Nature and Parks Authority. At the southernmost point of the nature reserve there is the Coral World Underwater Observatory, the first of its kind in the world, and the largest public aquarium in the Middle East. It was listed as one of The New York Times' Places to Go in 2019.

As of 2018, the Eilat coral reef is growing.

== History ==
The coral reef in Eilat is unique in many ways. It is the northernmost coral reef in the world, and its isolated location in the Gulf of Aqaba, where salinity is higher and there is less water movement than on most days. This has enabled the development of many endemic species. In the past, the reef covered the entire western shore of the Gulf of Aqaba, and parts of the northern coast, so that its length was over 12 kilometers, but due to human activities it was harmed and the reef has been reduced to a very small area. The natural reserve was one of the three best known natural reserves in Israel in 1962.

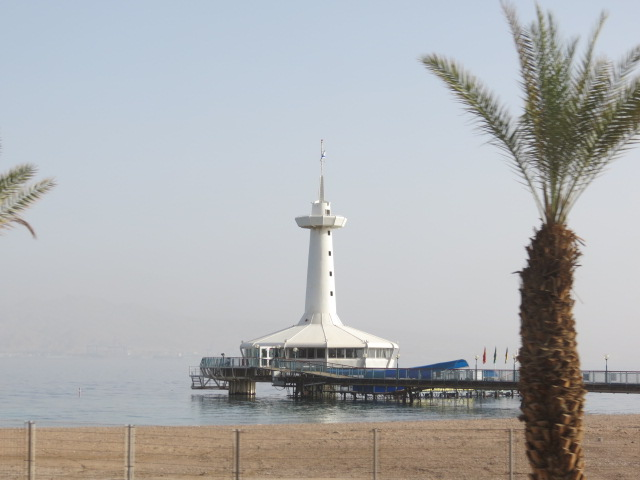
Eilat Coral World Underwater Observatory

The main reserve, Coral Beach Reserve, was established in 1964. An adjacent and more southerly reserve, the Eilat South Sea Nature Reserve, was declared in 2002, and a third reserve, Coral Sea Nature Reserve, was declared in 2009.

The coral reef is the only coral reef in Israel.

== Preservation ==
In 2018, Jerusalem Post reported on the coral reef and said that the coral reef was growing again.

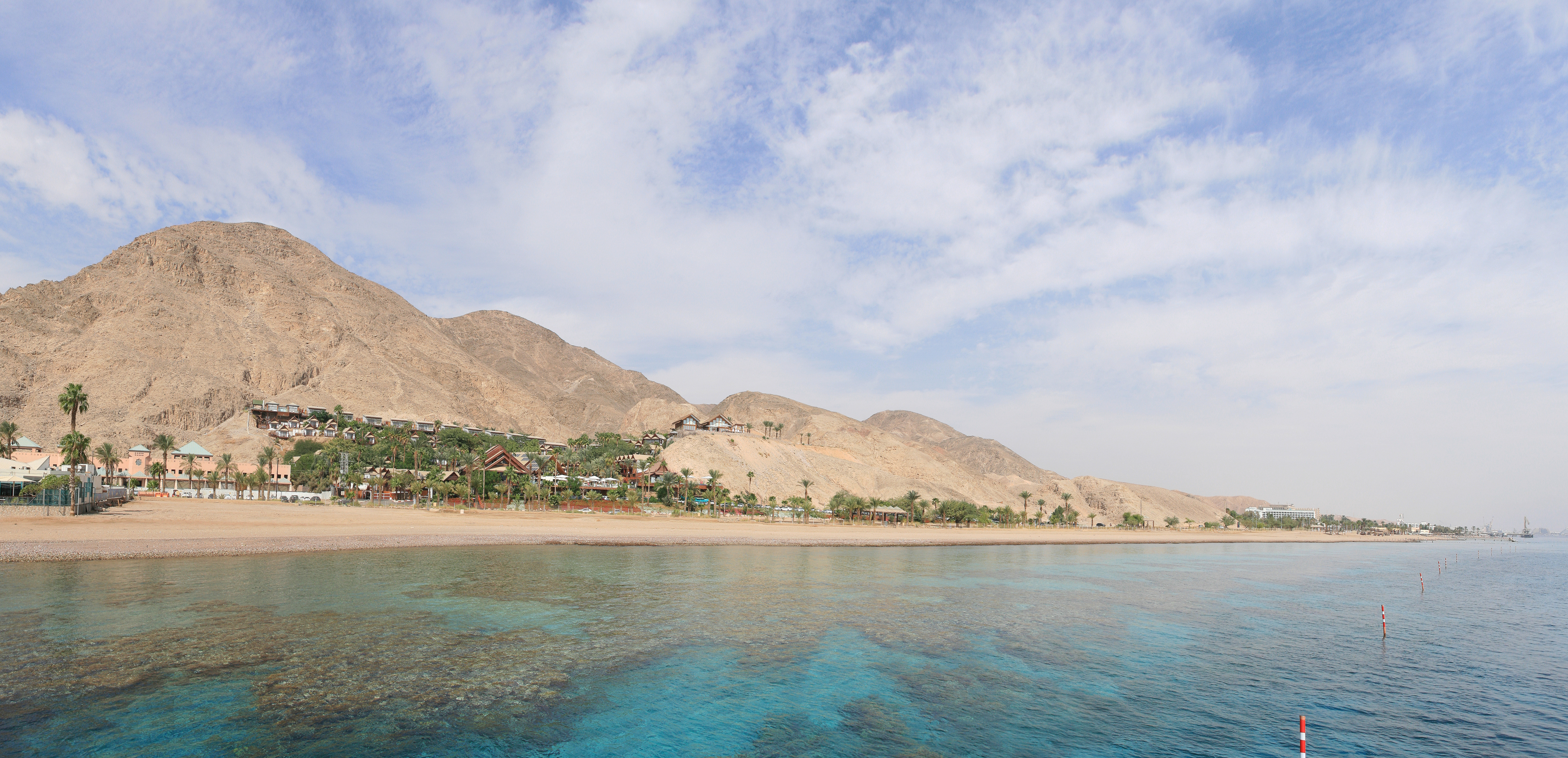
Eilat Coral reef

The main purpose of the nature reserve, for which it was established, is the preservation and rehabilitation of the reef in the Gulf of Aqaba, which was severely damaged over the years. As part of the conservation activities, the reserve defined most of the lagoon area (except for 3 shallow wading pools) as protected and closed by a fence on the side of the beach and buoys from the sea side, so that visitors will not be able to swim there and harm the corals and reef dwellers. In addition, the reserve has regulations against feeding fish and animals, which may be harmed by eating human food, or even accidentally swallow plastic wrappers and choke on them. In addition, the Society for the Protection of Nature in Israel sends divers and volunteers to clean the beach and the reef itself, search for debris and plastic packaging (which can often get stuck on a coral and suffocate it), and lead tours to the area.

The reserve also monitors the corals and fish in the reserve, so that their health and developmental status can be known. In order to encourage the growth of the reef, iron and stone structures were scattered on the sandy bottom opposite the reef wall that simulate the areas on which corals usually form, thus allowing more room for corals to grow and develop in, which in turn allows more living areas for the reef dwellers.

== Gallery ==
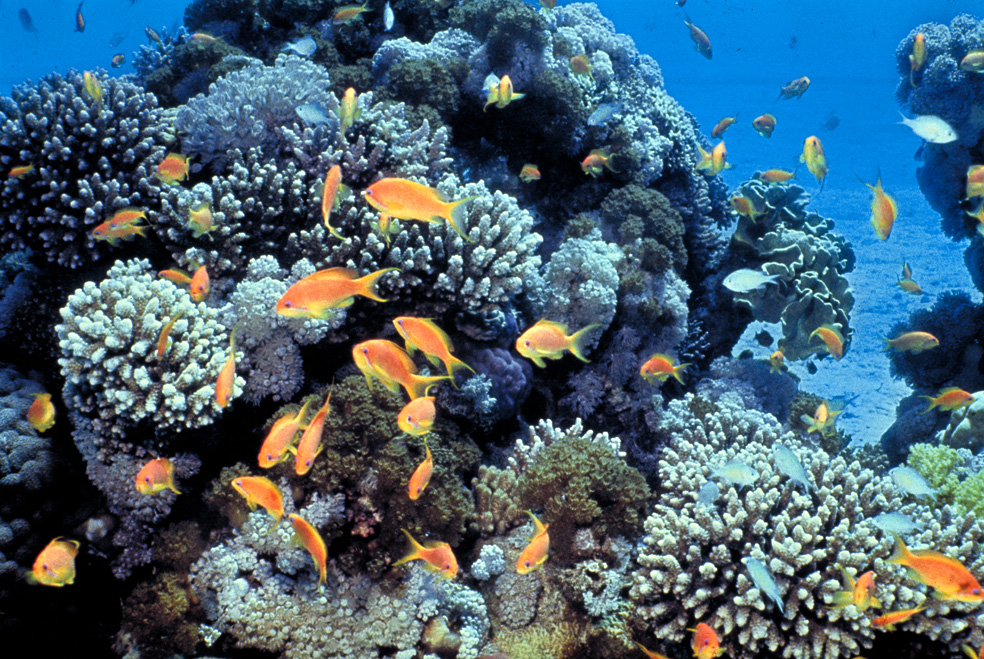

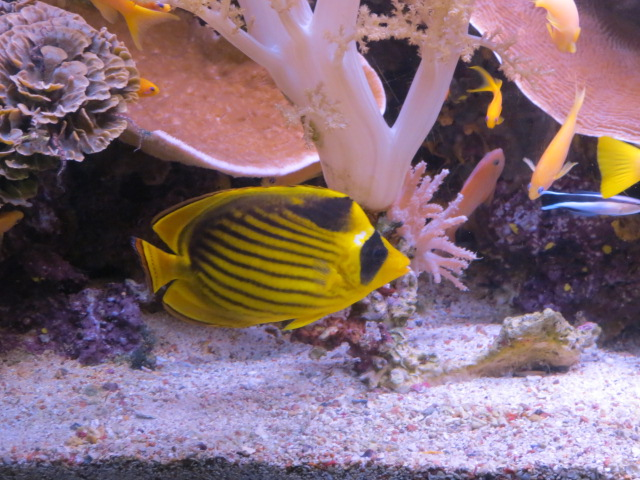

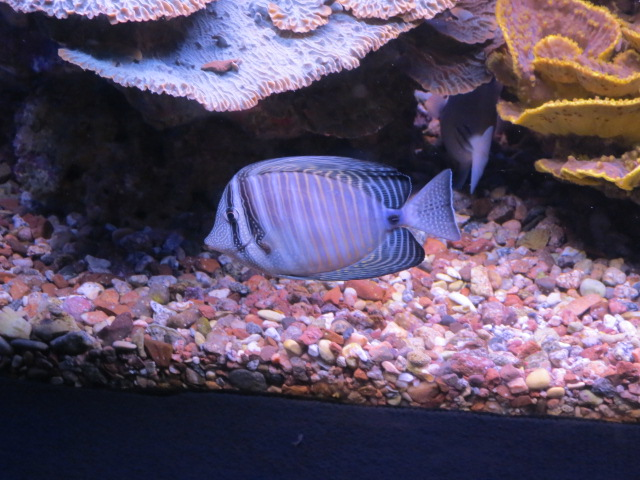

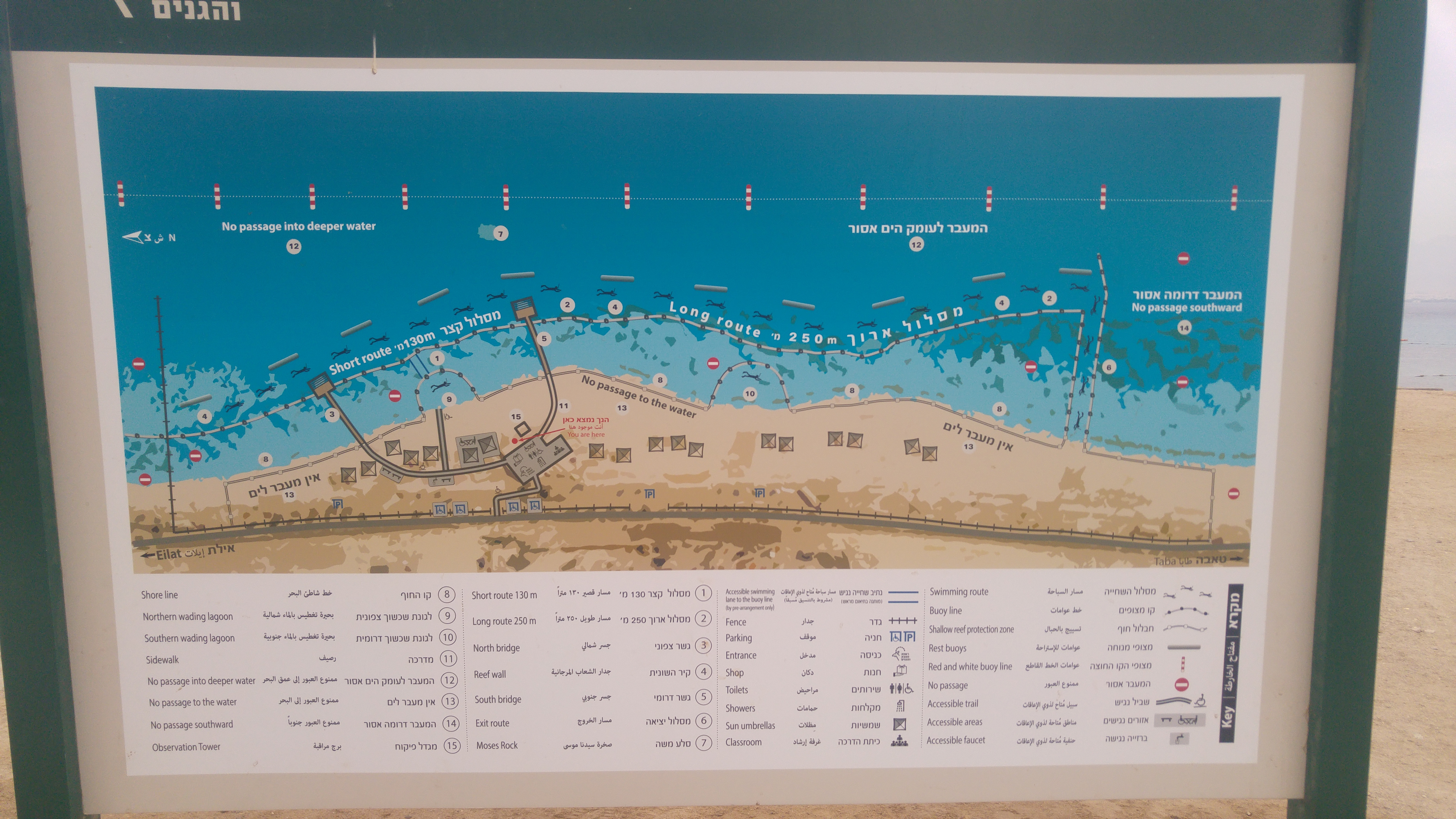
Eilat coral reef nature reserve map

== See also ==
- Coral World Underwater Observatory
- Coral Reef
- Tourism in Israel
