= Coral World Underwater Observatory =

Coordinates: 29.504°N 34.918°E

Coral World Underwater Observatory, Eilat
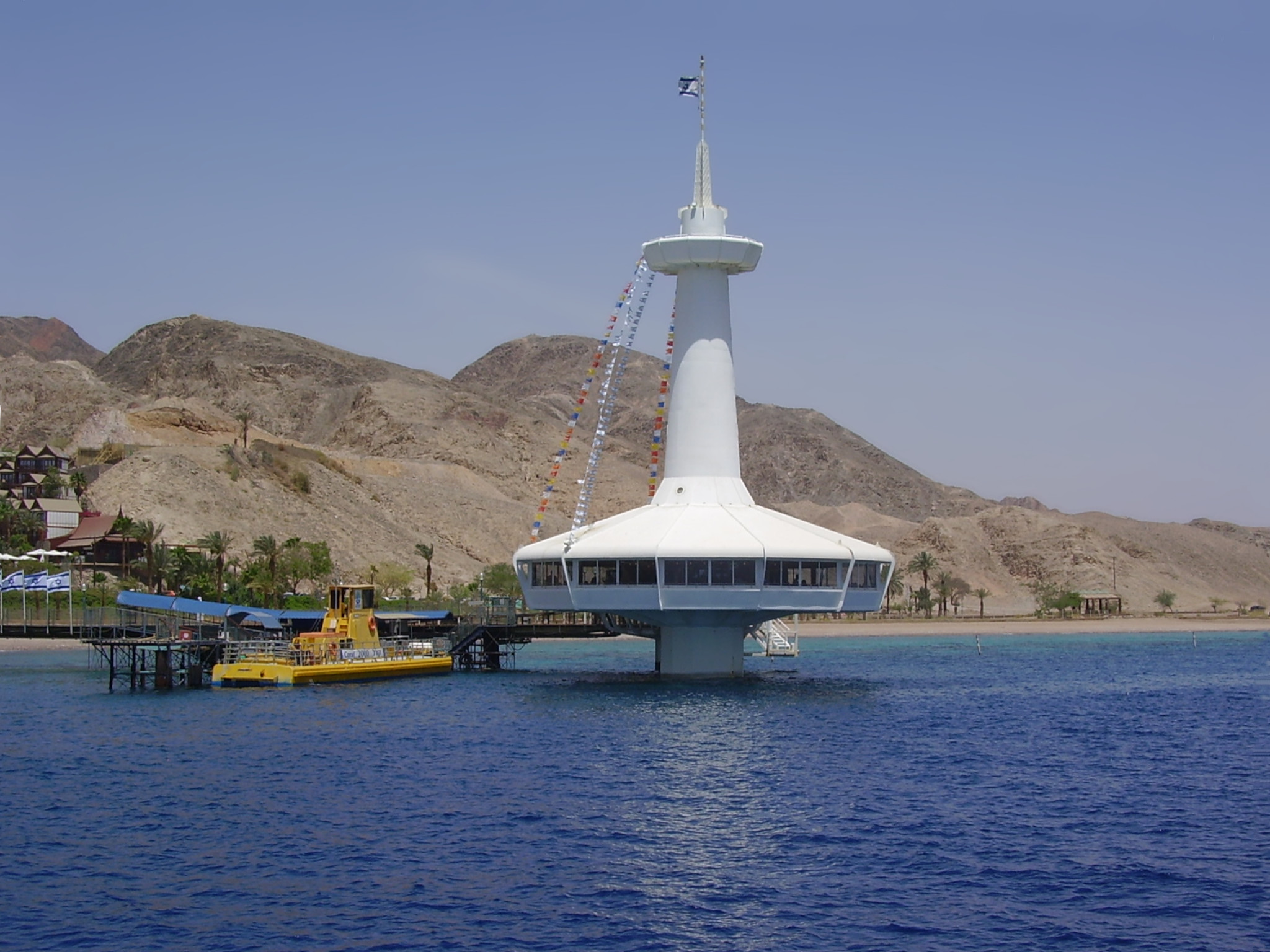
- The Underwater Observatory, with the Coral 2000 glass-bottom boat
- Interactive map of Coral World Underwater Observatory, Eilat
- Date opened: 1974
- Location: Eilat, Israel
- No. of animals: 20,000 (Not including the wild aquatic animals that can be seen from the observatory, and hatchlings, considering most aquatic species are capable of laying hundreds of eggs)
- No. of species: 850 (Not including the wild aquatic animals that can be seen from the observatory)
- Volume of largest tank: 3,000,000 L (790,000 US gal)
- Memberships: Coral World International
- Major exhibits: Underwater observatory, Shark World, Rare Fish exhibit, Coral 2000, Amazon Hut, Red sea circular exhibit, Sea turtle exhibit
- Website: www.coralworld.com

Eilat's Coral World Underwater Observatory is a public aquarium, park and conservation center located in Eilat, Israel. It is the biggest public aquarium in Israel, and it hosts over 800 species. It was founded in 1974 and was the first of its kind. The park and aquarium is located to the south of Eilat's Coral Beach nature reserve.

== History ==
The park was founded in 1974 by the zoologist and marine biologist David Friedman. The idea of the observatory was planned in 1972, it took careful planning to create the observatory without harming the natural environment. The observatory was built completely on land, which was then flooded with water from the Red Sea using armory parts and other metals. The base of the observatory was connected to large iron chains, and after the observatory was placed many corals were planted on and around the observatory in order to repair the damage that was done during the making of the observatory. The coral reef around the observatory flourished and became a major feeding spot for many fish and other marine wildlife, both carnivorous and herbivore. To preserve the biodiversity of the Gulf of Eilat all the water returns to the sea in an ecologically neutral condition. Water comes through the system of aquariums, reaches thousands of sea creatures and then is filtered to eliminate all mechanical and biological contamination.

In May 2025, a diver working for the facility died while on duty at the observatory.

== Exhibits ==
=== Entrance aquarium ===
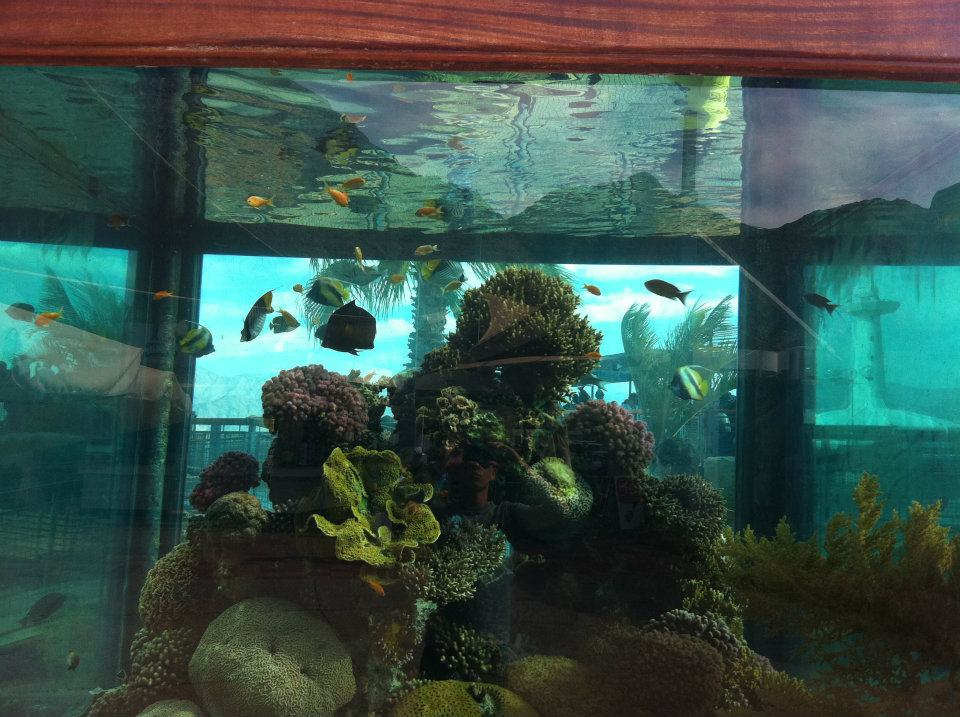
The entrance aquarium

The entrance aquarium is a medium cubic aquarium in the entrance square of the park. It features several species of corals, butterflyfish, crabs, and more. The aquarium (as well as in all the other exhibits at the park) is connected directly to the Red Sea; the water is pumped and replaced constantly from the sea.

=== Red Sea circular exhibit ===
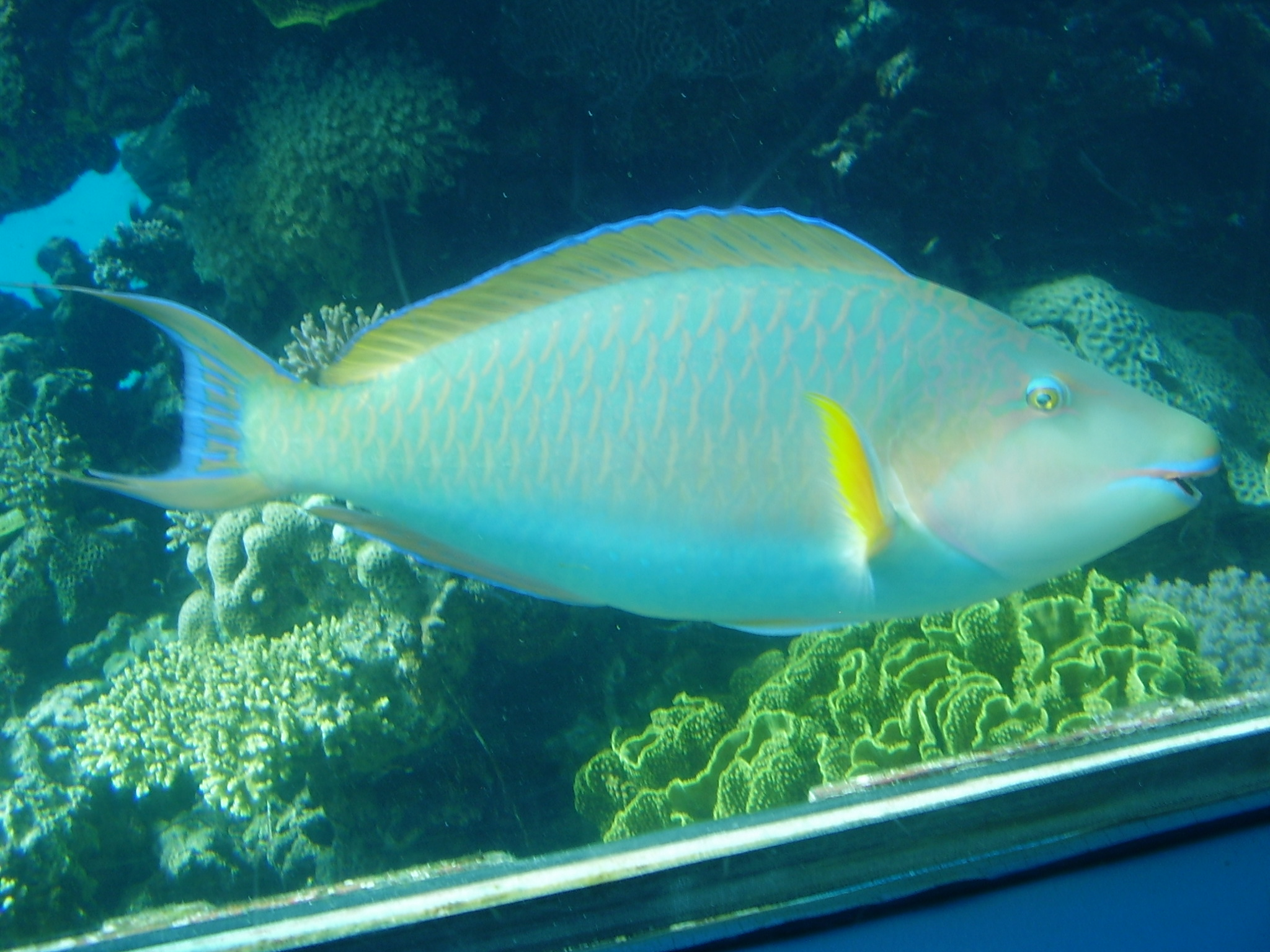
Parrotfish at the Circular exhibit

The Red Sea Circular Exhibit is a 360-degree exhibit in which visitors stand in the middle and are surrounded by 360,000 litres of water featuring a complete natural ecosystem. The exhibit features corals, herbivorous fish, carnivorous fish, parasites, crabs, shrimp and more, all living in one functioning ecosystem. All the animals are fed daily thus ensuring they don't harm each other. The circular exhibit is used for research about the unique ecosystem of coral reefs. The water in the circular exhibit are pumped from 42 meters deep in the Red Sea and are circulated 24/7.

=== Turtle and stingray pools ===
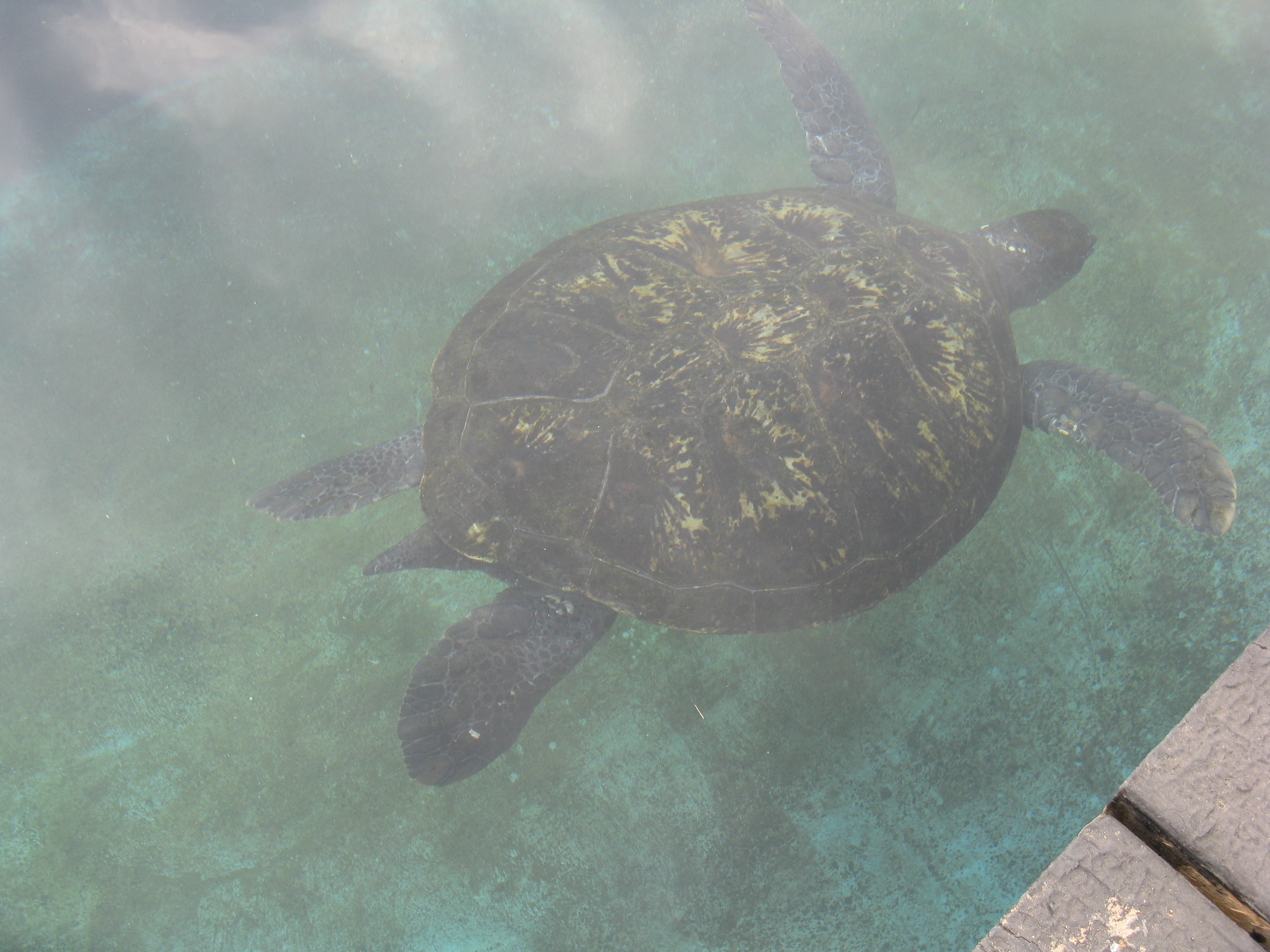
Female Green sea turtle in the turtle pool

The Turtle and Stingray pools are three shallow (3.5 meter deep) pools, which exhibit hawksbill sea turtles, green sea turtles, and spotted eagle rays. In the middle of one of the pools, there is a small sand island for female turtles to lay their eggs. When the eggs hatch, the baby turtles are taken into a small aquarium, where they are safe from predators and where they receive food and vaccinations. As they grow bigger, they are transferred to a bigger aquarium, and finally, when they are two years old with a very high chance of survival in the wild, they are released into the ocean. The Underwater Observatory's turtle conservation program is one of the leading programs in the field and so far has released hundreds of turtles back to nature.

=== Rare fish exhibit ===
The Rare Fish Exhibit is a large exhibit separated into three rooms which exhibits rare fauna and flora of the red sea in medium-sized aquariums. The first two rooms feature animals such as lionfish, Red Sea clownfish, starfish, rare corals, moray eels, lobsters, seahorses and more. In the exhibit, there is a total of 250 species, featured in 35 medium aquariums. Some of the animals in the exhibit are endemic to the Red Sea, and are in the observatory park for means of breeding and conservation. The seahorse conservation program is a success, and since 2002 thousands of seahorses have been released into the Red Sea. The aquariums are designed to mimic the animals' natural habitat and thus educate visitors about different marine biomes and habitats.

The third room of the exhibit is the nocturnal room. The nocturnal room features various nocturnal animals such as flashlight fish, squid, jellyfish, crabs and more. The exhibit also features active and awake corals - as corals are nocturnal animals. Most of the animals in the exhibit are capable of bioluminescence.

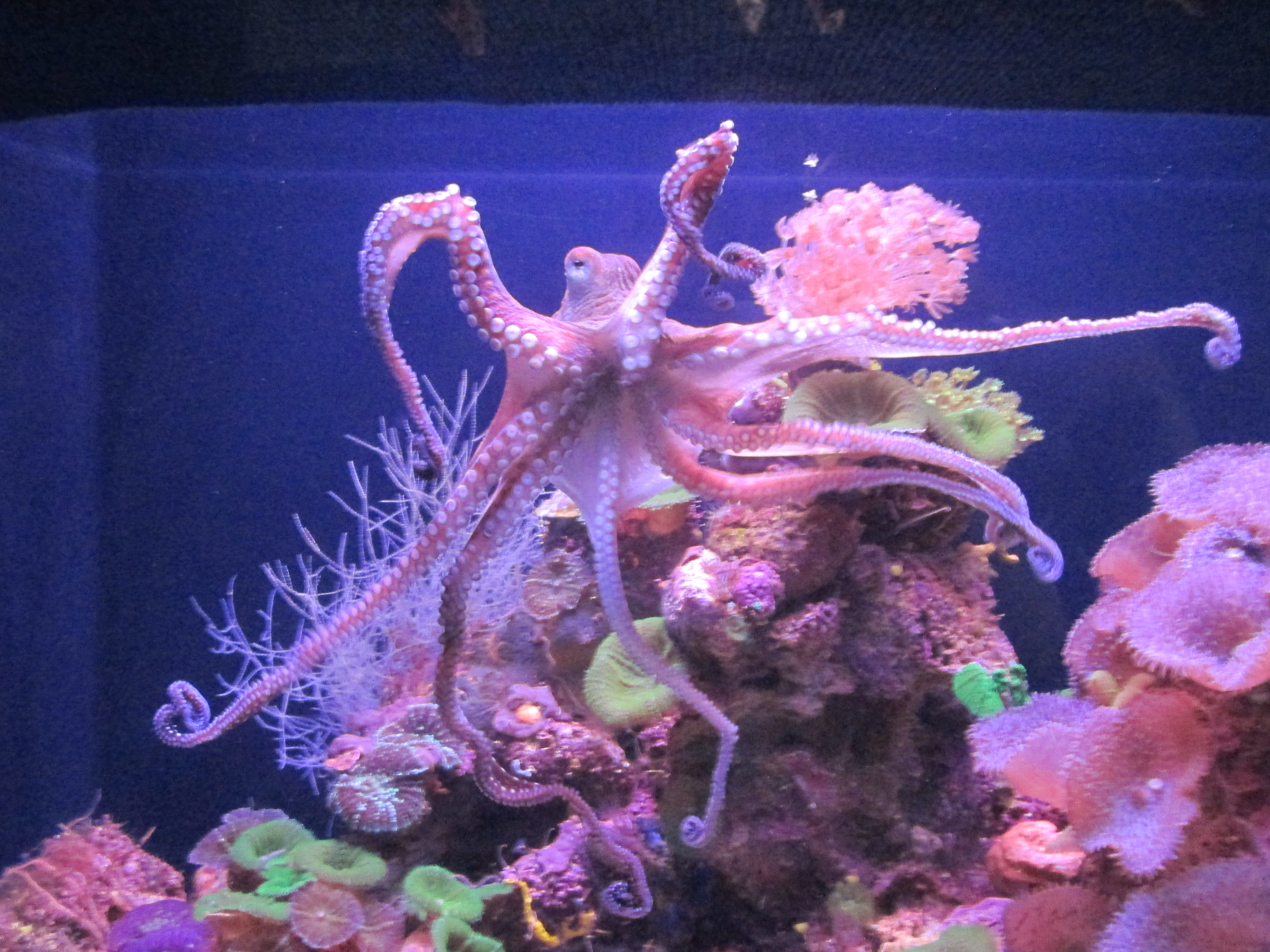
Octopus at the rare species exhibit

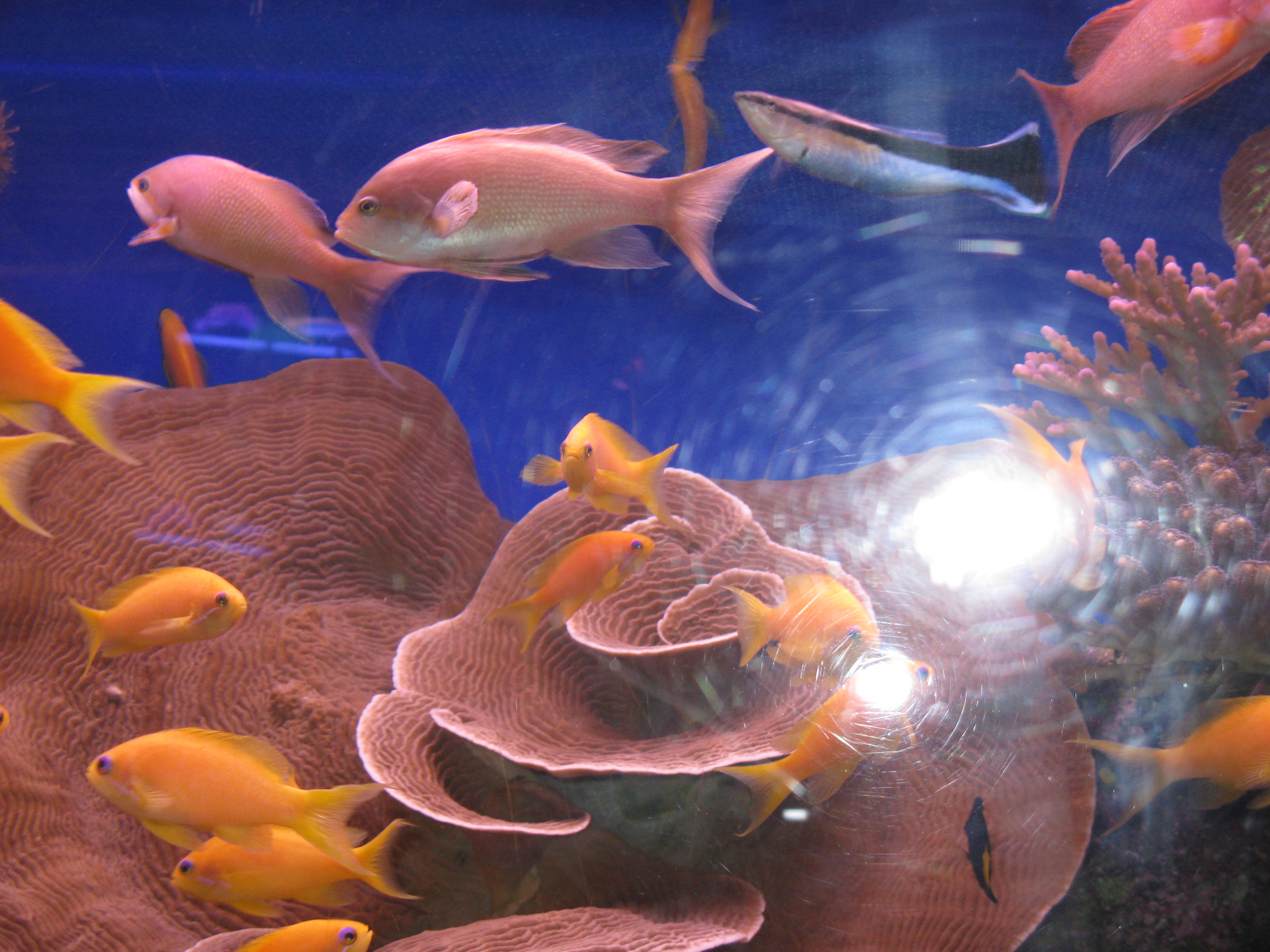
Sea goldies at the rare species exhibit

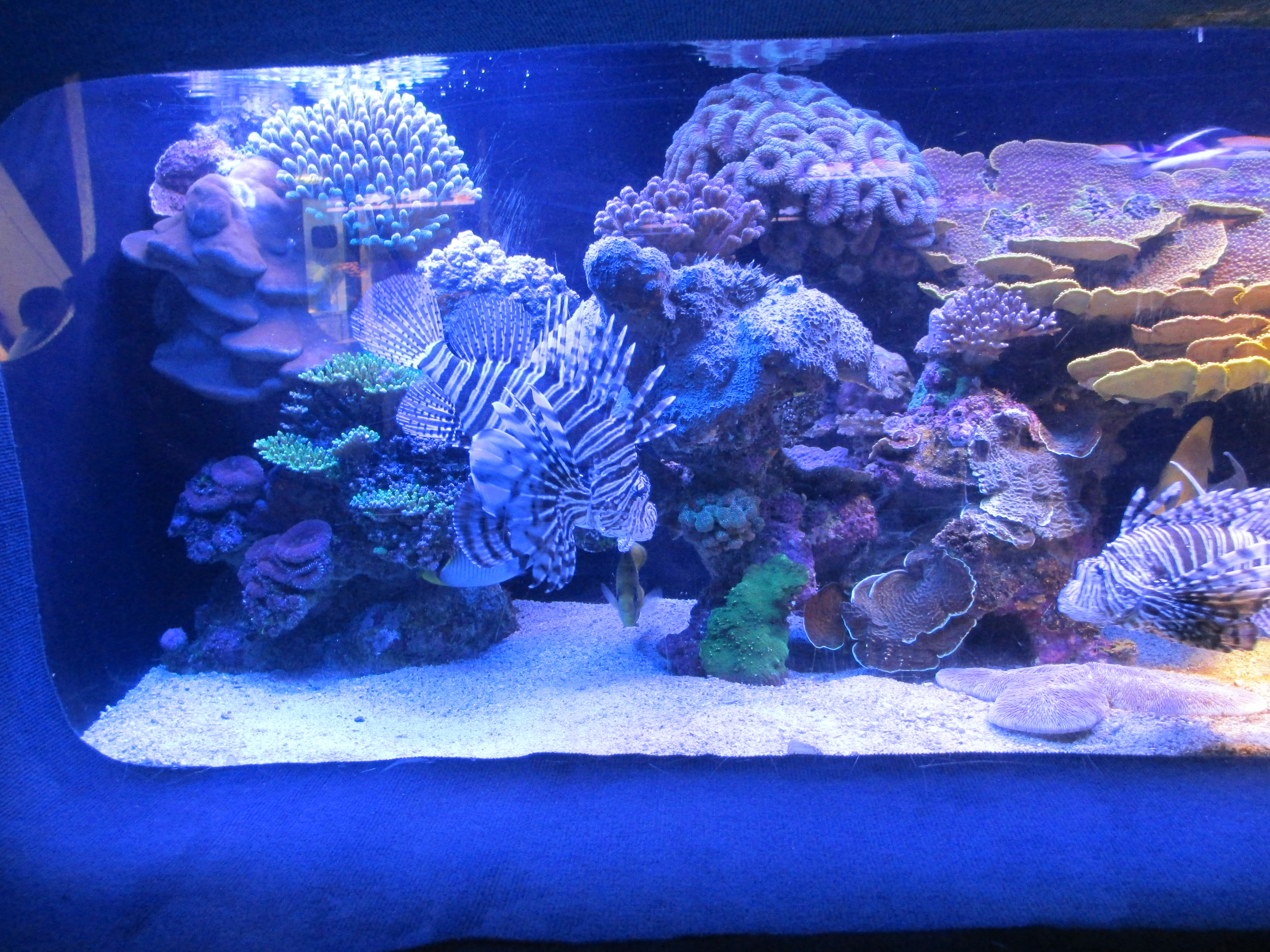
Common lionfish at the rare species exhibit

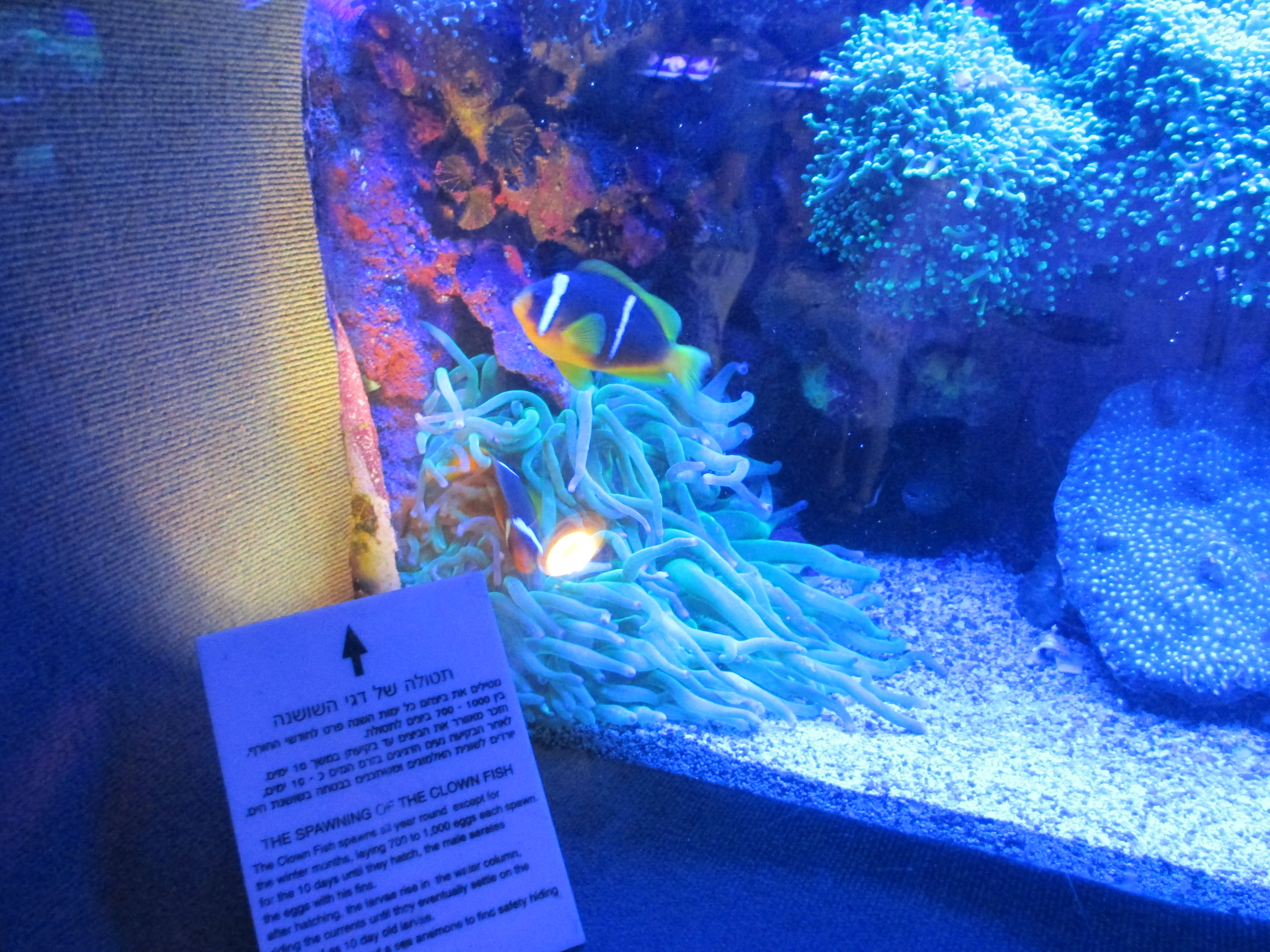
Red Sea clownfish at the rare species exhibit

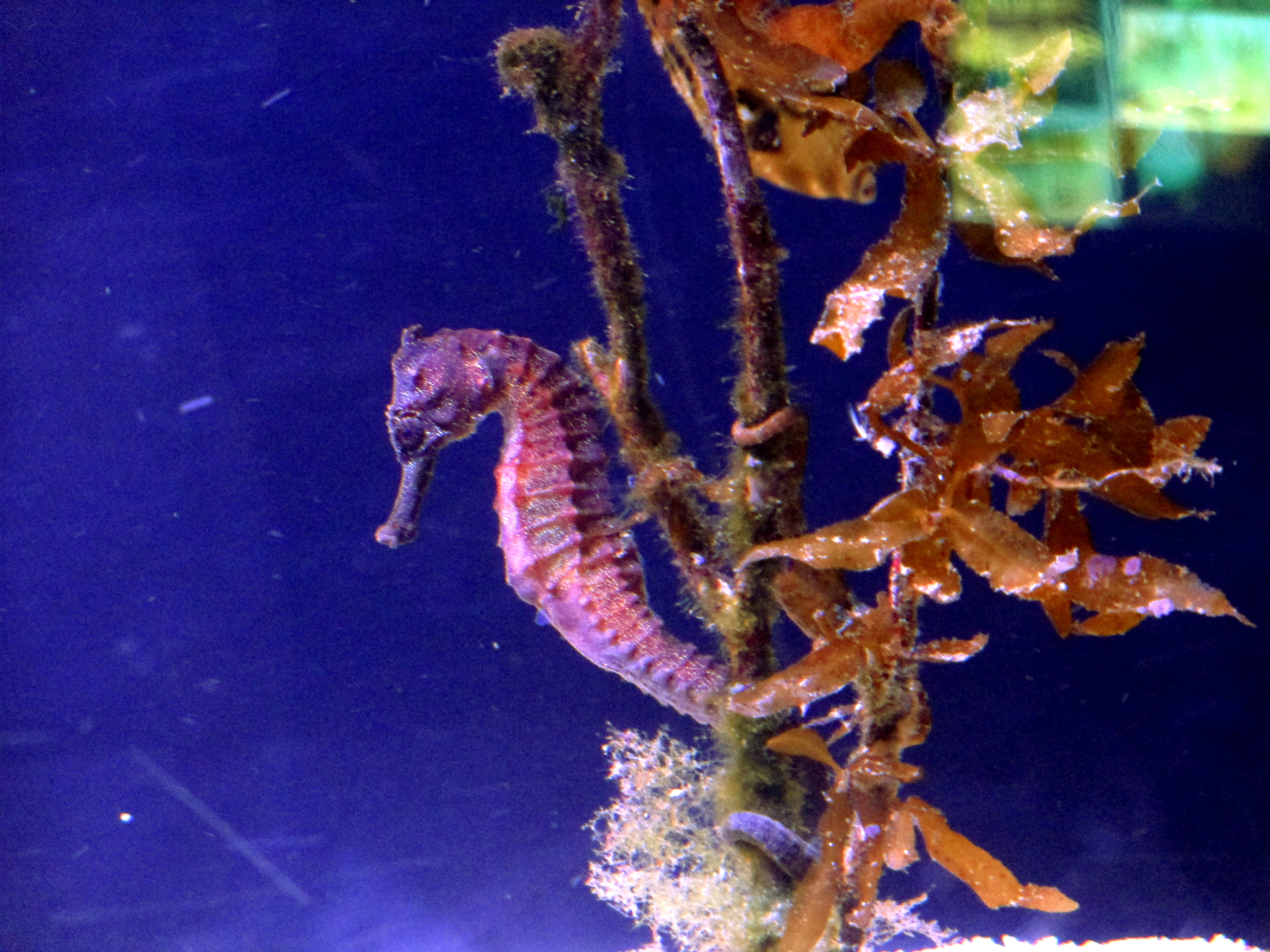
Seahorses at the rare species exhibit

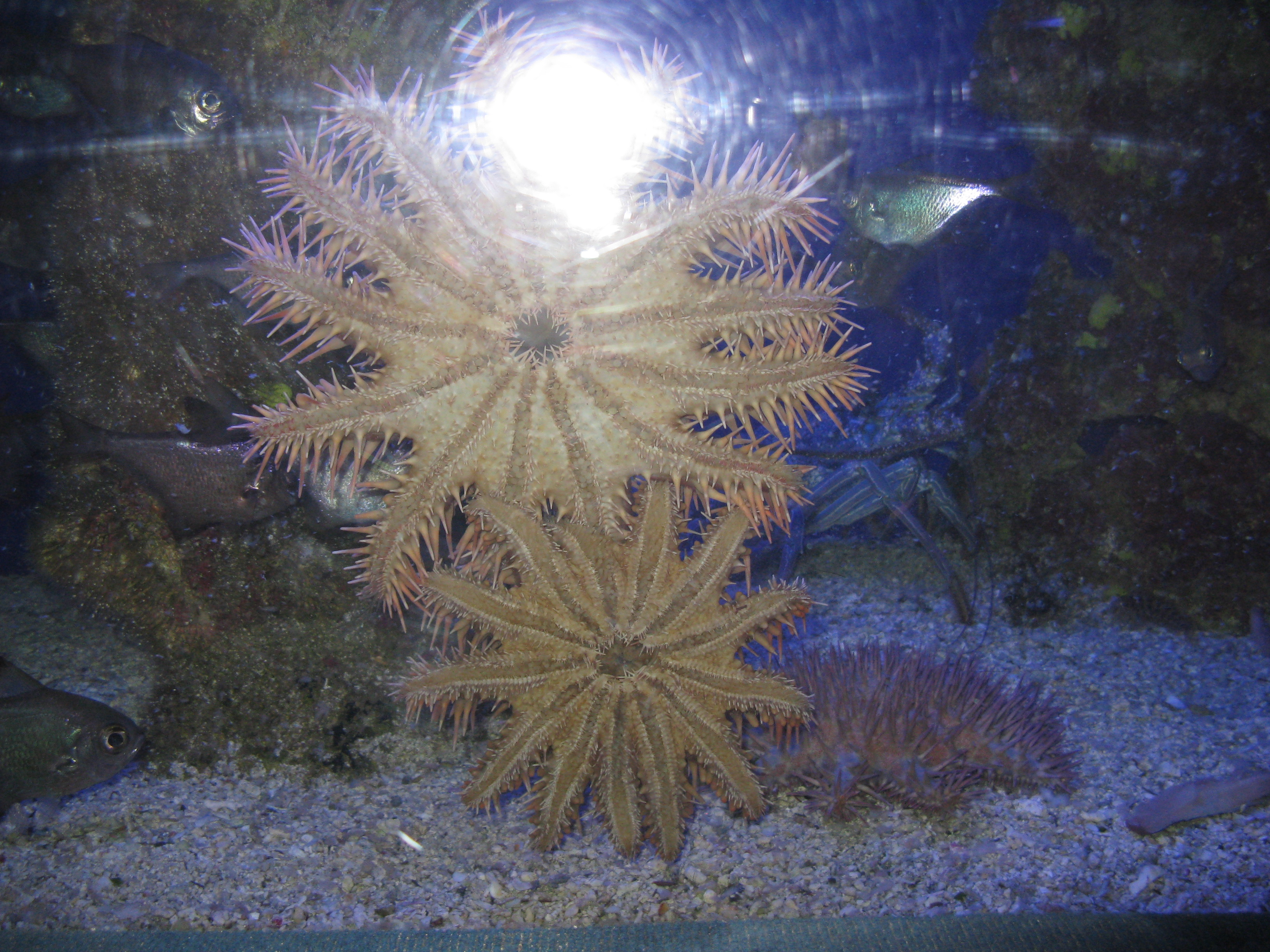
Nocturnal species at the rare species exhibit

=== Amazon hut ===
The Amazon Hut is a rainforest-themed exhibit featuring both aquatic and land-based wildlife from South America, such as caimans, electric eels, piranhas, arowanas, poison dart frogs, lizards, tarantulas, and more. It is used to explain fresh water ecosystems, and the importance of rainforests.

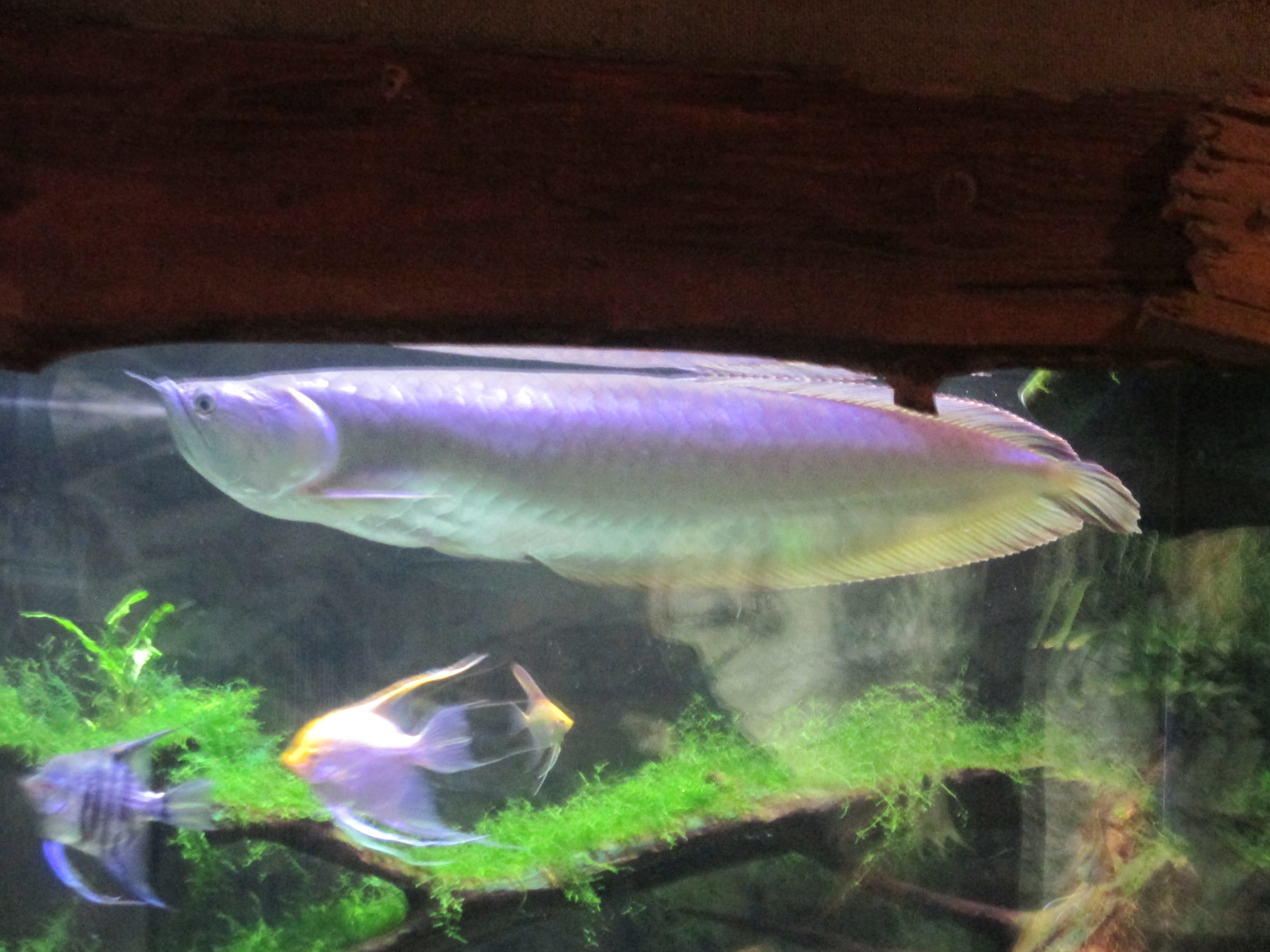
Arowana at the Amazon Hut

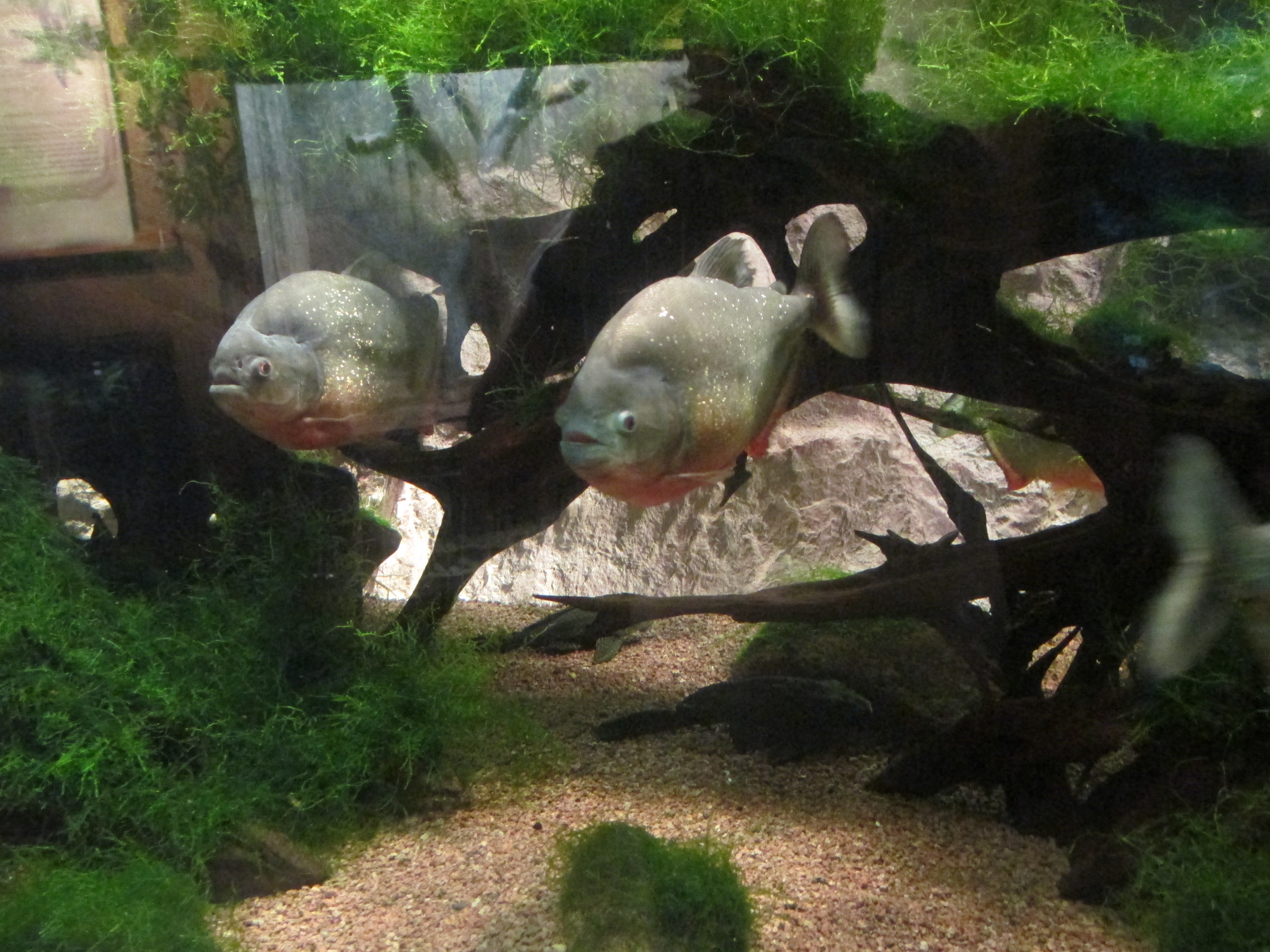
Piranhas at the Amazon Hut

=== "Shark World" ===
The "Shark World" exhibit is a huge exhibit containing 3,000,000 L (790,000 US gal) of water, and featuring 20 shark species, rays and corals. The exhibit has a huge viewing window, an underwater tunnel and an interactive explanations area with educational stations about the importance of sharks and the threats facing sharks in the wild.

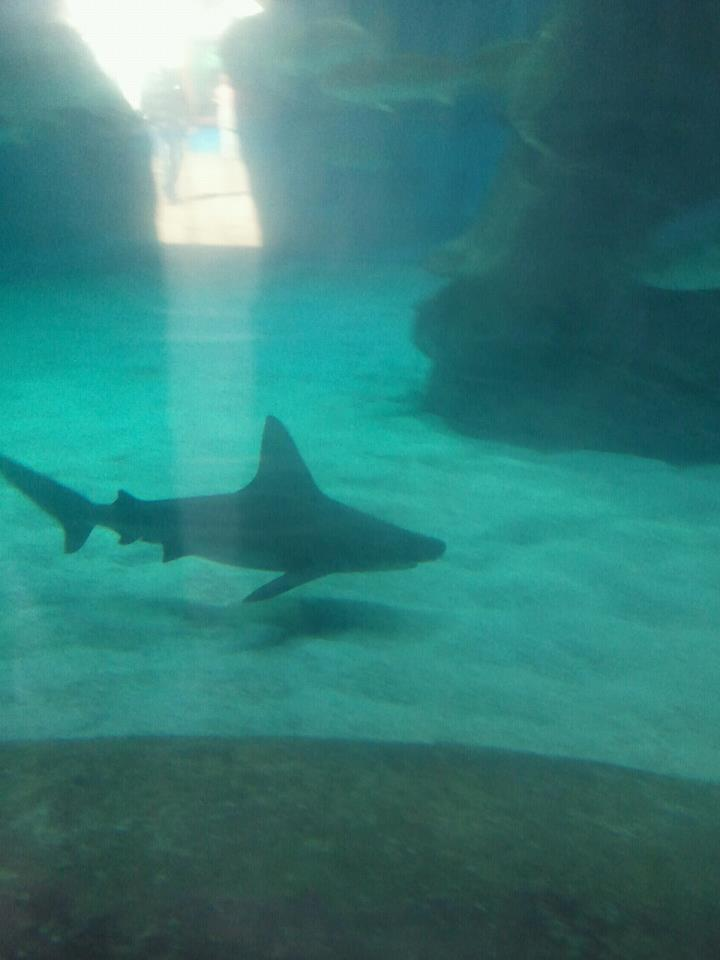
Reef shark at the shark exhibit

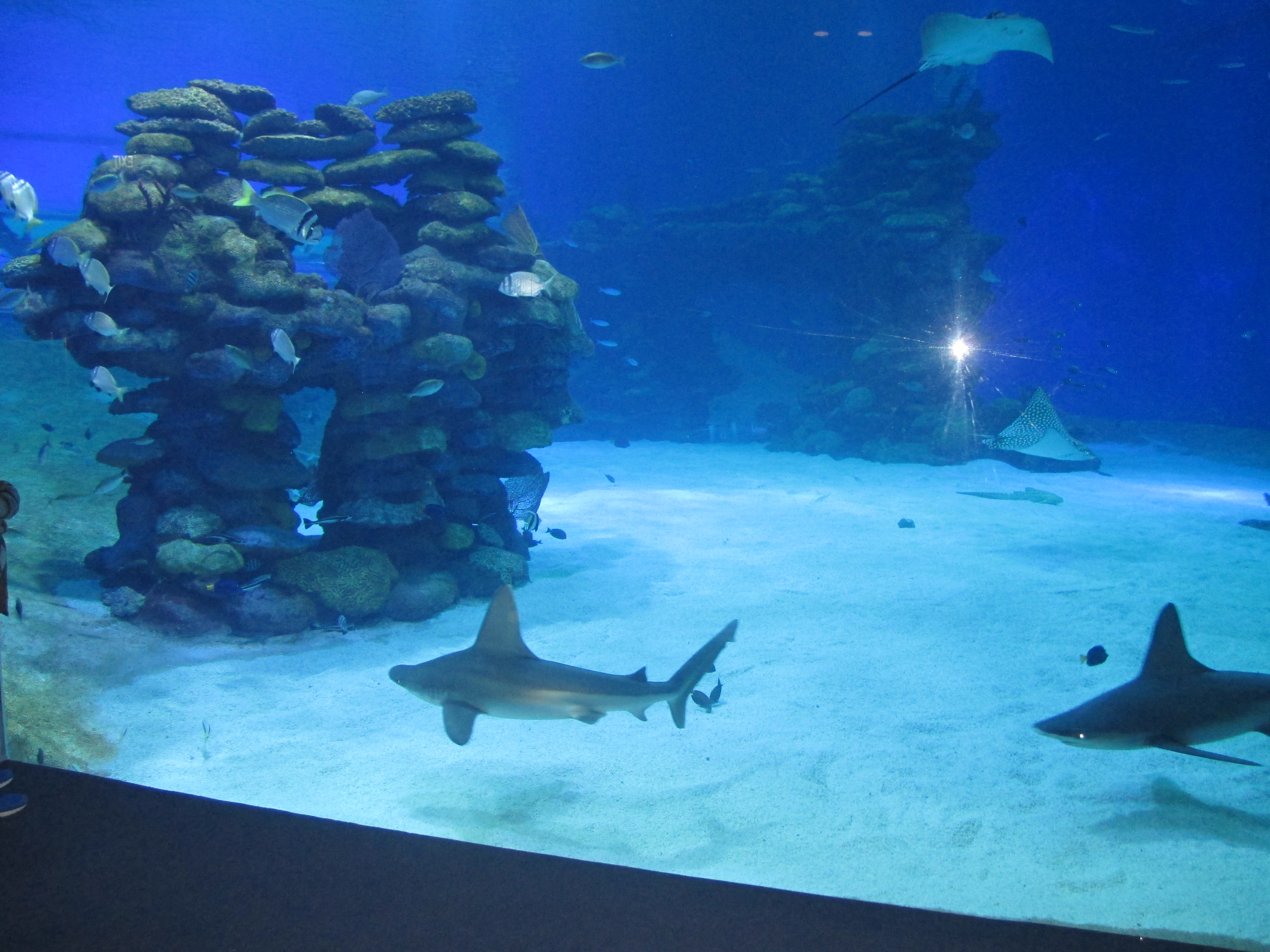
Whitetip reef sharks at the shark exhibit

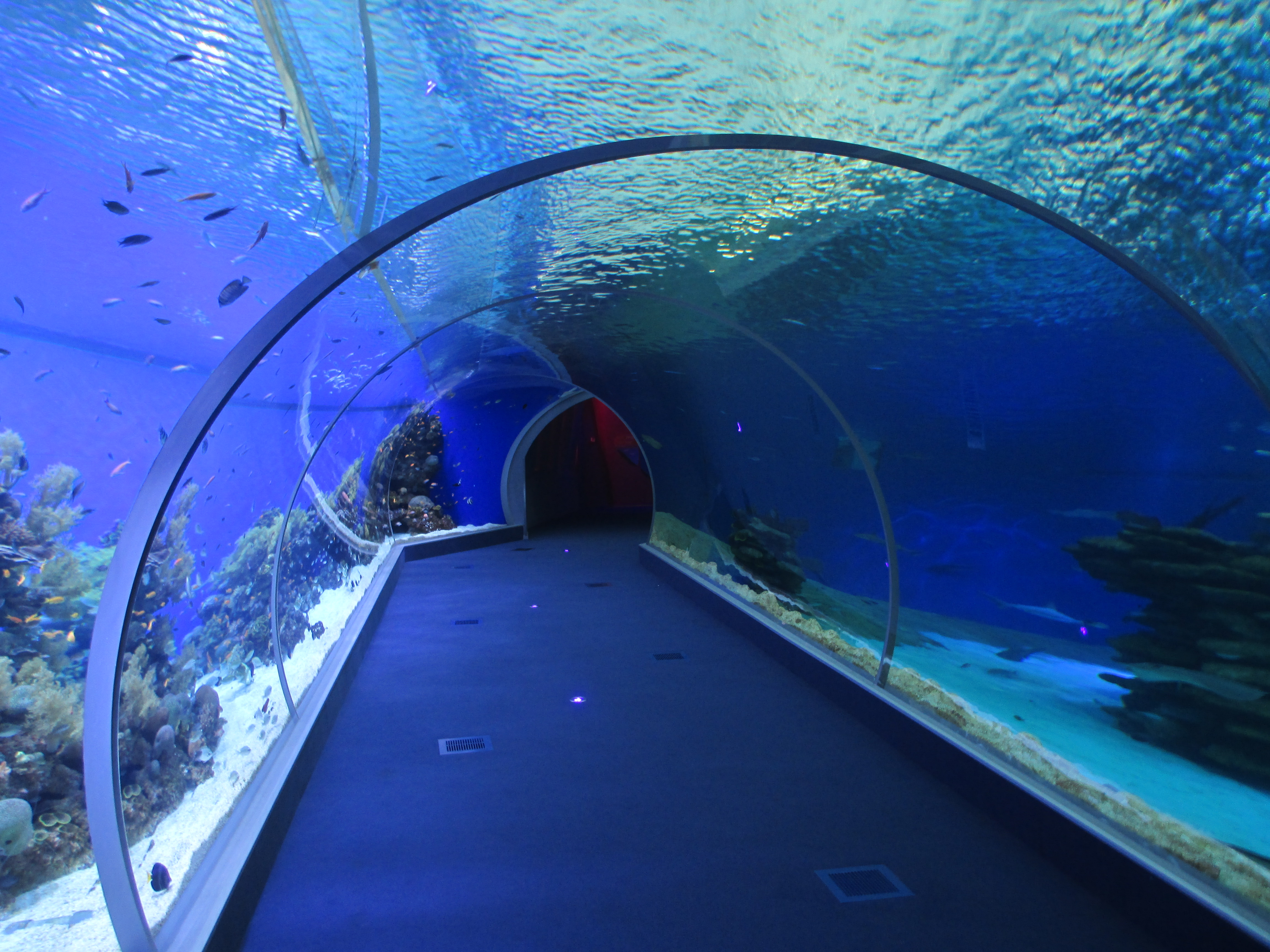
The underwater tunnel

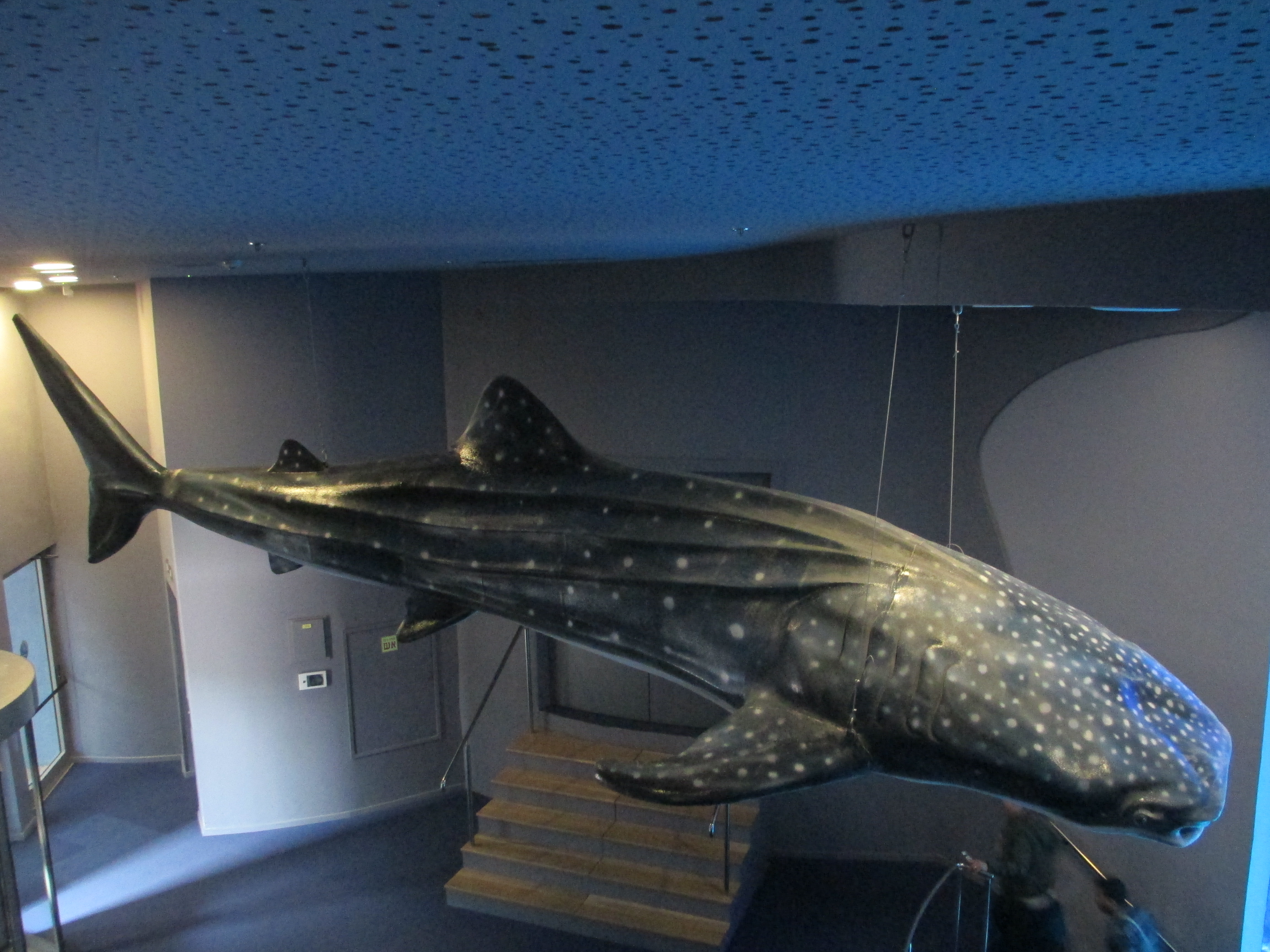
Real life size statue of a whale shark at the interactive explanation area

=== The underwater observatory ===
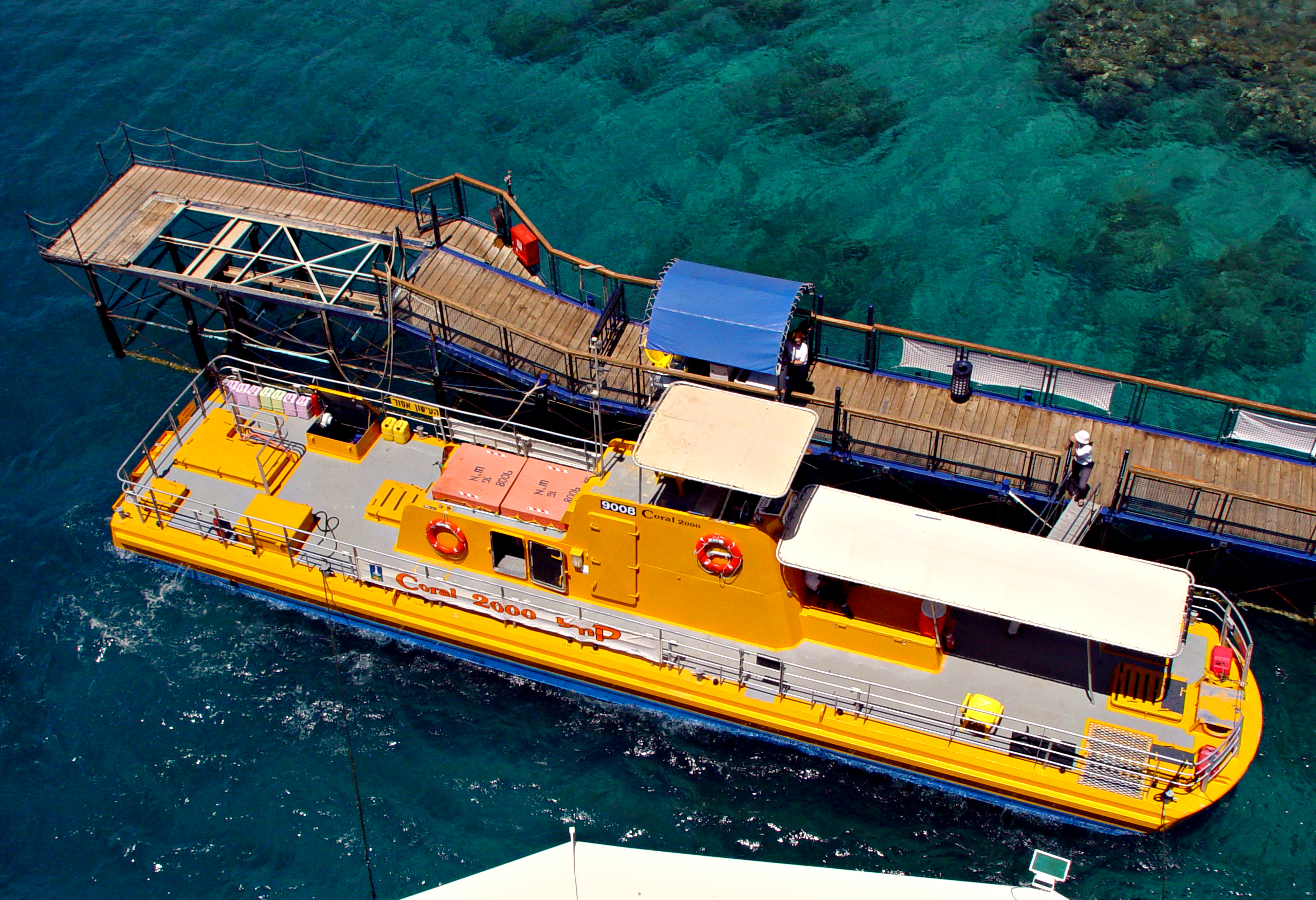
Glass-bottomed boat Coral 2000

=== Coral 2000 ===
Coral 2000 is an underwater observatory in Eilat. The Coral 2000 is a glass-bottomed boat. This unique ship was built in Australia in 1994 and made its way to Eilat in 1999. The Coral 2000 offers views of Eilat's coral reef. A Coral 2000 cruise lasts about 35 minutes.

== Additional attractions and activities ==
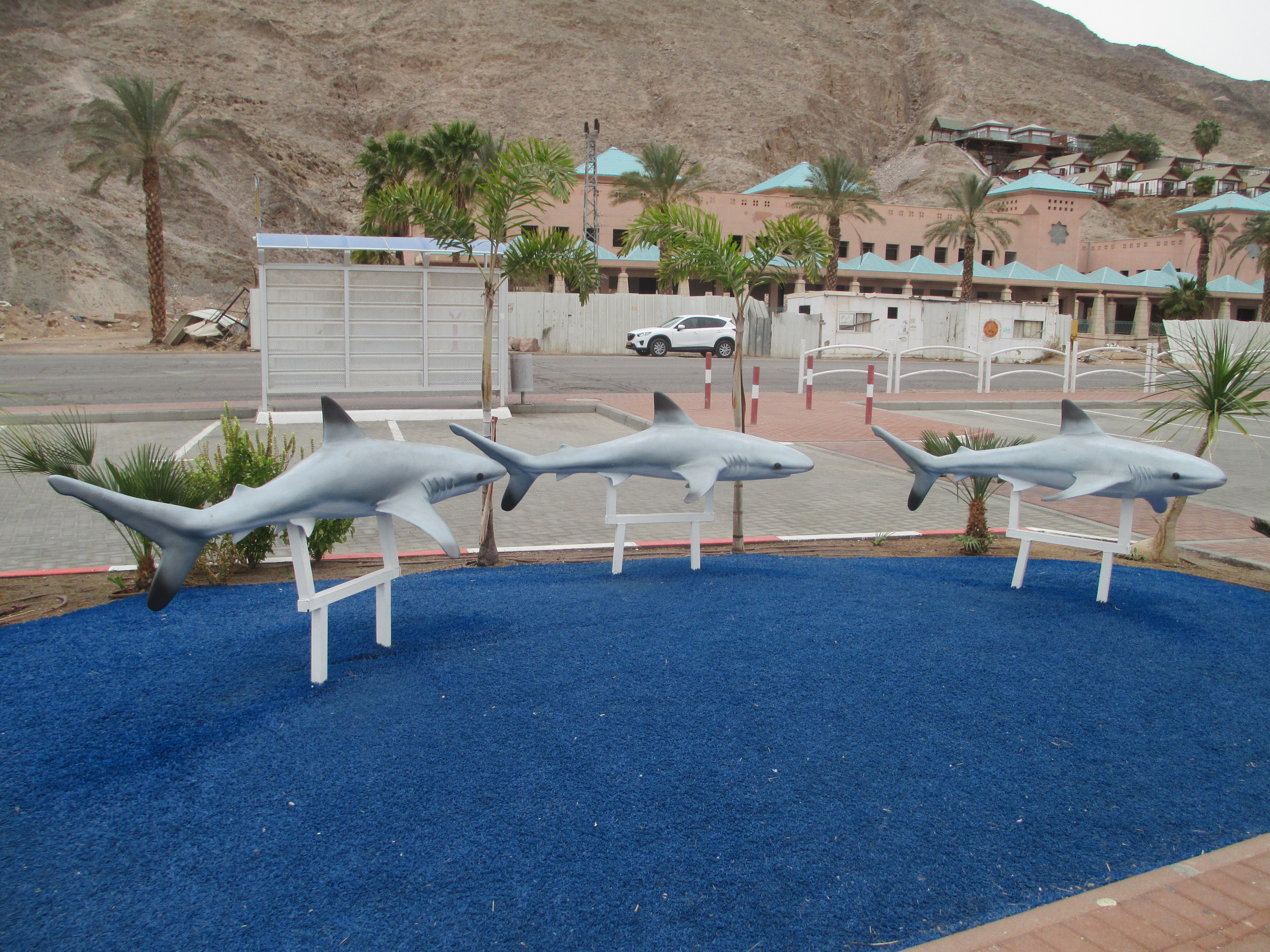
Marine theme amusement park in the underwater observatory

=== Oceanarium ===
The Oceanarium is a 4D movie documenting the life of sharks in the wild, and in particular, the rare whale shark.

=== Additional shops ===
In addition to the animal exhibits, educational stations and daily activities, the park hosts several shops including two for jewelry, one for photography, a diving shop and a gift shop. There are also three food kiosks, a coffee house and a "Shark Bay" restaurant on site.
