= Coral reef organizations =

Organizations which currently undertake coral reef and atoll restoration projects using simple methods of plant propagation:

- Coral Cay
- Counterpart International
- Coral Restoration Foundation (CRF) : Adopt a Coral
- Cozumel Coral Reef Restoration Program (CCRRP) : Based on Cozumel, Mexico. They restore the local reefs and have a volunteer program.
- Ocean Gardener : Indonesian NGO that conserves and restores coral reefs in Indonesia. Has tours, courses and volunteer programs and the proceeds go toward their coral restoration programs and helping local communities pivot to a regenerative economy.
- U.S. Coral Reef Task Force (CRTF)
- National Coral Reef Institute (NCRI)
- US Department of Commerce's National Oceanic and Atmospheric Administration (NOAA): Coral Reef Conservation Program (CRCP)
- National Center for Coral Reef Research (NCORE)
- Reef Ball
- Southeast Florida Coral Reef Initiative (SEFCRI)
- Reef Renewal Foundation Bonaire (RRFB)
- Reef Renewal Foundation Curaçao (RRFC)
- Foundation of the peoples of the South Pacific
- WorldFishCenter: promotes sustainable mariculture techniques to grow reef organisms as tridacnidae

Organizations which promote interest, provide knowledge bases about coral reef survival, and promote activities to protect and restore coral reefs:

- Australian Coral Reef Society
- Biosphere Foundation
- Blue Corner Marine Research
- Chagos Conservation Trust
- Conservation Society of Pohnpei
- Conservation Key
- Coral Cay Conservation
- Coral Reef Care
- Coral Reef Alliance (CORAL) Coral Reef Alliance (CORAL)
- Coral Reef Targeted Research and Capacity Building for Management
- Coral Restoration Foundation
- Coral Triangle Initiative
- Cousteau Society
- Crusoe Reef Society
- CEDAM International
- Earthwatch
- Environmental Defense Fund
- Environmental Solutions International
- Friends of Saba Marine Park
- Global Coral Reef Alliance (GCRA) Global Coral Reef Alliance (GCRA)
- Global Coral Reef Monitoring Network
- Great Barrier Reef Foundation
- Great Barrier Reef Marine Park Authority
- Green Fins
- ICRAN Mesoamerican Reef Alliance
- International Coral Reef Action Network (now defunct ?)
- International Coral Reef Initiative (ICRI)
- International Marinelife Alliance
- International Society for Reef Studies
- Intercoast Network
- Japanese Coral Reef Society
- Kosrae Conservation and Safety Organization
- Marine Conservation Group
- Marine Conservation Society
- Mesoamerican Reef Tourism Initiative (MARTI)
- NSF Moorea Coral Reef Long-term Ecological Research site
- Nature Conservancy
- Ocean Voice International
- Project AWARE
- Planetary Coral Reef Foundation
- Practical Action
- Project Reefkeeper
- ReefBase
- Reef Check
- Reef Relief
- Reef Support
- Reefwatch
- Save Our Seas Foundation
- Seacology
- Seamarc Pvt. Ltd.
- SECORE
- Singapore Underwater Federation
- Society for Andaman and Nicobar Ecology
- Tubbataha Foundation
- Wildlife Conservation International
- WWF

== See also ==
- Census of Coral Reefs
- Coral reef protection
- Frozen zoo
- National Ice Core Laboratory
- Amphibian Ark
- Svalbard Global Seed Vault
- Rosetta Project
