= Coral reef protection =

Modifying human activities to reduce impact on coral reefs

A diversity of corals

Coral reef protection is the process of modifying human activities to avoid damage to healthy coral reefs and to help damaged reefs recover. The key strategies used in reef protection include defining measurable goals and introducing active management and community involvement to reduce stressors that damage reef health. One management technique is to create Marine Protected Areas (MPAs) that directly limit human activities such as fishing.

Recreational scuba diving can have a measurable adverse impact on tropical coral reefs, mostly due to contact damage of brittle and fragile branched stony corals. The most common damages of corals while diving occurs due to the fins striking the corals as well as hands, knees, and equipment gauges. This can be reduced by improving diver buoyancy and trim skills, and by educating divers on the consequences of clumsy behavior on the reef ecosystem. Divers given a 45-minute presentation on coral biology and protected areas combined with a brief in water demonstration have been shown to cause less damages to corals during their dive.

It takes approximately 10 thousand years for coral polyps to form a reef, and between 100,000 and 30 million years for a fully mature reef to form.

== Coral reefs ==
See main articles: Coral Reef, Coral Reef Fish

Coral reefs are among the most productive and biologically diverse ecosystems on Earth. Differences in exposure to wave patterns create a variety of habitat types. The coral need a mutualistic symbiotic relationship with zooxanthellae algae in order to build a reef. The single celled algae derive their nutrients by using photosynthesis, and the coral provide shelter to the algae in return for some of the nutrients. Zooxanthellae populations can die with changing environmental conditions, causing the coral to lose color, known as coral bleaching. Environmental conditions such as a rise in water temperature inflict stress on the corals causing their symbiont Zooxanthellae to be expelled. The loss of Zooxanthellae causes corals to starve because they have lost the sugar food source Zooxanthellae had provided. Corals that require the symbiotic algae receive their vibrant colors from the different species of Zooxanthellae that inhabit them.

== Ecosystem services ==
Corals provide millions of people with ecosystem services such as fisheries, medicine, tourism and recreation, coastal protection as well as aesthetic and cultural benefits, yet they constitute a mere 0.2% of the world's marine ecosystems.

=== Biodiversity ===
Also known as the "rainforests of the sea", coral reefs cover less than 10% of the ocean yet provide a habitat to over 9 million species, approximately one fourth of all marine life, for food, shelter, and even hunting grounds for predators. Species found on coral reefs include fish, invertebrates, birds, and megafauna such as sharks, sea turtles, and marine mammals. Finally, they serve as essential spawning, nursing, and breeding grounds for numerous organisms.

=== Coastal Protection ===
Coral reefs provide complex structures that buffer the ocean's waves, protecting coastlines from strong currents and nasty storms. Approximately 500 million people live within 100 km of coral reefs and rely on them for this protection. Not only are they critical in preventing the loss of lives, property damage, and erosion, but they also serve as a barrier for harbors and ports that depend on them economically.

=== Fisheries ===
Over a billion people globally depend on the fish that live among coral reefs as a major food source. It is estimated that half of all US commercial and recreational fisheries depend on coral reefs to provide them over $100 million annually. Globally, fisheries account for $5.7 billion of the net income provided by coral reefs.

=== Medicine ===
Species found in coral ecosystems produce chemical compounds that are used to develop new medicines to treat cancer, arthritis, asthma, heart disease, ulcers, bacterial infections, and viruses. As early as the 14th century, the medicinal properties of coral reef dwelling species were utilized. Antiviral extracts and tonics continue to be studied and toxic compounds such as neurotoxins discovered in coral reefs have proven beneficial as painkillers. Diterpenes isolated from coral have been shown to exhibit anti-inflammatory as well as anti-microbial properties that are useful in medicinal therapies. The limestone skeleton of coral has been tested and used for human bone grafts, due to its porous nature and has a lower rate of rejection than artificial bone graft materials.

=== Tourism and recreation ===
Millions of scuba divers and snorkelers visit coral reefs every year for recreation. Local economies rely heavily on coral reefs, receiving about $9.6 billion through diving tours, recreational fishing trips, hotels, and restaurants.

== General interests ==
There are four main categories of interest the public should have for the preservation of coral reefs: the preservation of natural beauty and value, the promotion of the local economy, potential source of new biological products, and preservation of the world ecosystems of which they are a part.

Over one-third of marine species live in coral reef ecosystems. These provide an underwater experience for snorkelers and divers with a significant tourism value. This genetic biodiversity has a lot of potential for industries like pharmaceutics, biochemistry, and cosmetics. This biodiversity also boosts the economy through an increase in marine tourism and commercial fisheries. Long-term, coral reefs have been recognized as large contributors to the absorption of carbon dioxide emissions which has been an important part of the mitigation of climate change.

== Stressors ==
Two types of stressors are associated with reef systems: natural and human-induced. The effects of these stressors can range from negligible to catastrophic.

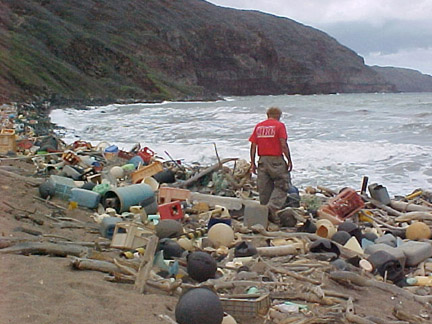
Debris on the coast of Hawaii

The warming waters, ocean pH changes and sea level rise associated with climate change operate on a global basis.

Ocean acidification reduces the availability of carbonate ions that corals use to build their calcium carbonate skeletons, which makes skeletal growth and keeping them more difficult. It can also impede skeletal thickening, cause less dense structures that are more vulnerable to damage from waves and eroding organisms.

Localized examples include residential, developmental, agricultural and industrial runoff, sedimentation from land clearing, human sewage and toxic discharges.

Acute stressors can inflict other damage, via unsustainable fishing practices, boat anchors or accidental groundings. Some fishing practices are destructive to reef habitats, such as bottom trawling, dynamite fishing and cyanide fishing. Ghost fishing (unintended damage from abandoned fishing equipment) harms many coral reefs. Even small-scale fishing can damage reefs if herbivores are removed and thereby not allowed to protect reefs from encroachment by algae. Boaters can damage coral by dropping their anchors on reefs instead of sand. Accidental boat groundings can obliterate areas of coral reef. Lettuce corals and branching corals such as elkhorn and finger coral are fragile, but even massive boulder corals can be crushed or broken and turned upside down to die by a sailboat keel. Groundings in sand, or even the churning action of propellers, can cause major localized siltation, indirectly killing adjacent corals.

During the 20th century recreational scuba diving was considered to have generally low environmental impact, and was consequently one of the activities permitted in most marine protected areas. Basic diver training has concentrated on an acceptable risk to the diver, and paid less attention to the environment. The increase in the popularity of diving and in tourist access to sensitive ecological systems has led to the recognition that the activity can have significant environmental consequences.

Scuba diving has grown in popularity during the 21st century, as is shown by the number of certifications issued worldwide. Scuba diving tourism is a growth industry, and it is necessary to consider environmental sustainability, as the expanding impact of divers can adversely affect the marine environment in several ways, and the impact also depends on the specific environment. Tropical coral reefs are more easily damaged by poor diving skills than reefs where the environment is more robust. The same pleasant sea conditions that allow development of relatively delicate and highly diverse ecologies also attract the greatest number of tourists, including divers who dive infrequently, exclusively on vacation and never fully develop the skills to dive in an environmentally friendly way.

=== Sediment ===
Sediment pollution from land has severe consequences for coral reef ecosystems. However, even along one coastline, separate reefs can experience different water flow conditions that affect sediment distribution. A 2015 study assessed sediment from two streambeds less than a mile apart on the island of Lānaʻi, Hawaii. One site experienced quick-moving currents that efficiently flushed away sediment, protecting the reef, while the other was subjected to currents and wave conditions that allowed sediment to be continuously re-suspended in the water, starving the reef of light.

=== Overfishing ===
The vast biodiversity of coral reefs consequently create an abundant fishing area for locals. This leads to overfishing of reef herbivore organisms which makes the coral reefs more vulnerable and unable to recover from large environmental disturbances. Unfortunately, most marine ecologists expect future oceans to be more overfished than now.

Currently, the majority of overfishing is done by commercial fishing companies. Local fisheries have a minimal impact on the health of the ocean in comparison additionally, local fishermen are increasingly replaced by commercial companies. Oftentimes, illegal industrial fishing ships will cast wide nets in the water, capturing large amount of sea life. These nets will drag across the ocean and coral reefs, destroying them in the process. Lots of by-catch occurs in this process. These nets can also become detached from the ship and become ghost nets and end up catching and trading sea life. These nets can remain in the ocean for hundreds of years.

=== Other ===
See Environmental issues with coral reefs#Issues

UV Filters UV radiation is a threat to public health in terms of sunburn risk, and skin cancer. In turn People use sunscreen that has UV filters in it to absorb excess UV radiation. Protecting the skin, and each UV filter has its own absorption rate based on the SPF amount for skin sensitivity. UV filters in sunscreen can be either organic or inorganic. Inorganic UV filters reflect and absorb UV light. Zinc oxide is widely used inorganic UV filters and are mainly incorporated into sunscreen because the larger, size particles usually leave unpleasant white marks on the skin. Some of the mineral UV filters do get additional coatings such as alumina or incorporated manganese to minimize the formation of free radicals. Exposure to all tested sunscreen and led to the conclusion that UV filters induce a lytic viral cycle that leads to coral bleaching. However, the study is limited by the lack of analytical data as well as flaws in the experimental setup.

== Monitoring ==
The continuous assessment of the health state of coral reef is an important task. To perform large-scale studies on the condition and bleaching of shallow-water coral reefs usually satellite or airborne imagery is used. To more accurately document the status of the reef, recently, photogrammetric techniques have been introduced to generate orthophotos of the interested areas either by using consumer drones or by capturing photos with scuba divers. To analyze and annotate the large orthographic images generated with these techniques semi-automatic segmentation techniques are applied using open source tools like TagLab.

== Restoration ==
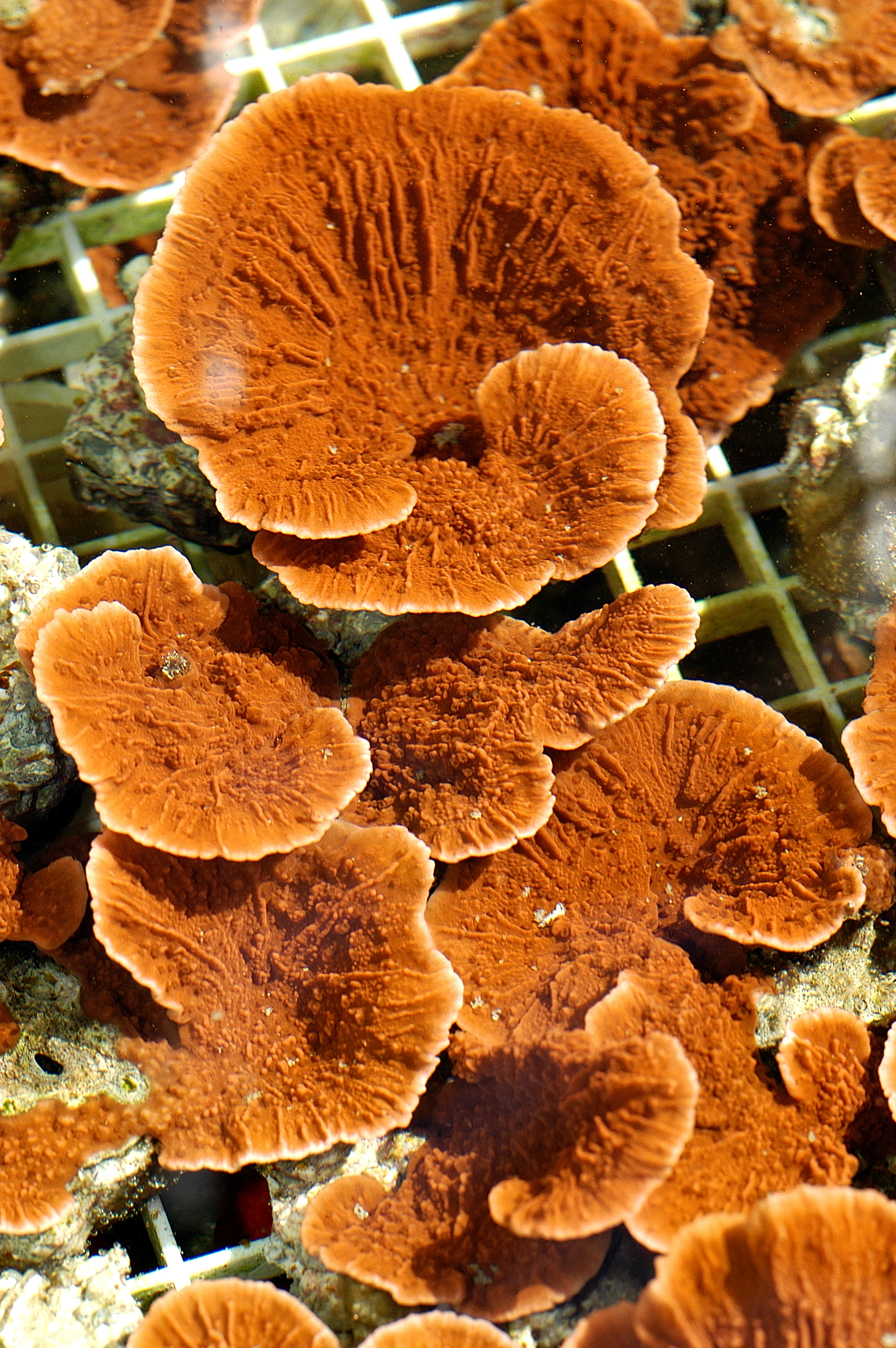
Coral growing in an aquaculture tank

It is difficult to create a substantial plan for the protection of coral reefs due to their location out in open water; there is no distinct ownership over certain parts of the ocean, which creates difficulty in delegating responsibility. But private and government groups whose purpose is to help the environment have made steps towards the restoration of coral reefs.

The aim of coral restoration is to help coral adapt to stressors and changing environments. NOAA's Coral Reef Conservation Program and Damage Assessment, Remediation and Restoration Program approaches restoration by responding to and restoring physically damaged reefs, preventing the loss of habitat, implementing coral conservation projects, focusing on restoring endangered coral species and controlling invasive species. The Coral Restoration Foundation has restored over 100 genotypes of staghorn corals (Acropora cervicornis) using coral nurseries, and also has research goals of determining ecological success, ideal restoration locations and how surrounding organisms affect restoration. Laboratories located near reefs, such as Elizabeth Moore International Center for Coral Reef Research & Restoration—which has planted more than 43,000 corals in the Florida Keys—play a crucial role in maintaining these nurseries.

Coral reefs can be grown both asexually or sexually- in land-based or ocean nurseries. One of the first and most crucial steps taken to restore coral reefs is assess the land using acoustic technology. Gathering live coral and coral fragments is essential. Once coral reach a certain size in the nursery, they are out-planted and then transported to coral reefs for the restoration process. Planting nursery-grown corals back onto reefs is a tedious process. However, it is of the utmost importance to make sure the habitat is suitable for natural coral growth. It is best to build coral that is resilient to threats like climate change. Moreover, each coral must be handled manually and transplanted to the reef by hand. Researchers and marine biologists have used 3D printing to produce coral structures designed to stimulate coral growth and preserve the underwater ecosystem.

=== Managing stream flow ===
Sediment flux can be reduced in steep watersheds on montane tropical islands in the Hawaiian archipelago by restoring vegetation and controlling invasive species. Gabions—check dams—created by planting normally invasive kiawe trees by a local community group, stopped 77 tons of sediment from flowing into the ocean that would have needed about five weeks of natural water flow to flush from the reef.

=== Coral nurseries ===
Coral aquaculture, the process of using coral nurseries to restore the world's reefs is a project that is capable of improving biodiversity, structural integrity and coral cover. Coral nurseries can provide young corals for transplantation to rehabilitate areas of reef decline or physical damaged. Direct transplantation is a common process where corals from coral nurseries or salvaged coral that has been dislodged is transplanted and attached in a new area. In this process, coral gametes are harvested from spawning grounds and grown in a laboratory environment, then replanted when they grow larger. This allows the coral to grow safely in controlled amounts under lab conditions. Nurseries can begin as small patches of rescued coral colonies, and may be salvaged and restored before transplantation. In 2009, The Nature Conservancy began to grow over 30,000 young coral in underwater nurseries in Florida and the Caribbean for transplantation.

== Management strategies of invasive species ==
Invasive species are non-native species that are introduced to an ecosystem through a variety of pathways such as: intentional introductions, accidental releases, and natural events like tsunamis. The most common pathways are said by researches to be ballast water exchange of ocean going vessels and the marine ornamental trade. Many species that are introduced into non-native areas either die out because they are not able to adapt to their new environment fast enough or they do survive but don't alter the ecosystems enough to cause any damage. However, invasive species are given their name because they are able to adapt and thrive in non-native ecosystems causing significant damage to their new ecosystems, the food-web and the environment itself which why it is necessary to develop these management strategies to control them.

Invasive species affect coral reefs both directly and indirectly, corallivores like the crown-of-thorns starfish directly consume corals while Pterois pose a threat through their over consumption of native species within coral reef ecosystems. Management strategies may vary depending on the type of invasive species. Outbreaks of these invasive species have become more frequent over the past century and are adding to the frequency at which coral cover is being lost.

=== Crown-of-thorns starfish ===
Native to the Indo-Pacific these marine invertebrates feed on coral and play a critical role in the coral reef ecosystem, regulating the diversity of corals and maintaining balance within the reefs. However, the crown-of-thorns starfish (Acanthaster sp., COTS) is also a natural boom-and-bust species which mean that their population dynamics are characterized by the extreme fluctuations in adult abundance, followed by population collapse as coral food levels decline, leaving a swath of dead coral behind. COTS outbreaks were first discovered in the 1960s on the GBR, occurring under natural conditions as frequently as every 50–80 years. However, unnaturally there has been an increase in the frequency of outbreaks to every 15 years has led to further research that still hasn't been answered.

Manual control

Manual control is the process in which experienced COTS control divers remove COTS from reefs either by lethal injections or hand collections and disposal on shore. This method has been around from the 1960s, since then 17 million starfish have been killed or removed as a collective by 84 manual control programs at an estimated cost of US$15–44 million. Due to the large cost and limited success in preventing COTS outbreaks and coral loss, scientists doubt the effectivity of this method. Sites are selected by the national governments of individual countries with coasts based on the potential significance in the overall pattern of coral and COTS larval spread for example: economically important for tourism, or located on reefs that oceanographic modeling suggested were highly connected to other reefs. Selected sites including permanent survey marked sites are used to precisely relocate RHIS survey sites for continuous measurements of coral cover.

Marine Protected Area zoning

Marine Protected Area zones are areas created by Marine National Parks or other management operators of a country. There are two components to a Marine protected area, zoning and the degree of protection for each zone. Marine zoning has in previous studies been highly successful in minimizing outbreaks of COTS when it is paired with manual control. There are three different types of zoning, 'no-take', 'limited-take' and 'take' zones on COTS numbers and coral cover.

Water quality management

Increasing water quality has the ability to increase or decrease COTS outbreaks. According to earlier studies, controlling the quality of the water can help prevent breakouts to some extent but this is not always tangible. Exposure to flood plumes variables and the presence of COTS indicated a positive threshold type response at low levels, highlighting the significance of larval nutrition availability for the establishment of COTS populations. Excess nutrients run-off from agricultural land uses (grazing, grain, sugar cane, and horticulture) create phytoplankton blooms in reef waters that can be carried to COTS populations. Water quality can be managed by controlling how catchments discharge water, but this requires intensive land management employing best management practices.

== Marine protected areas ==
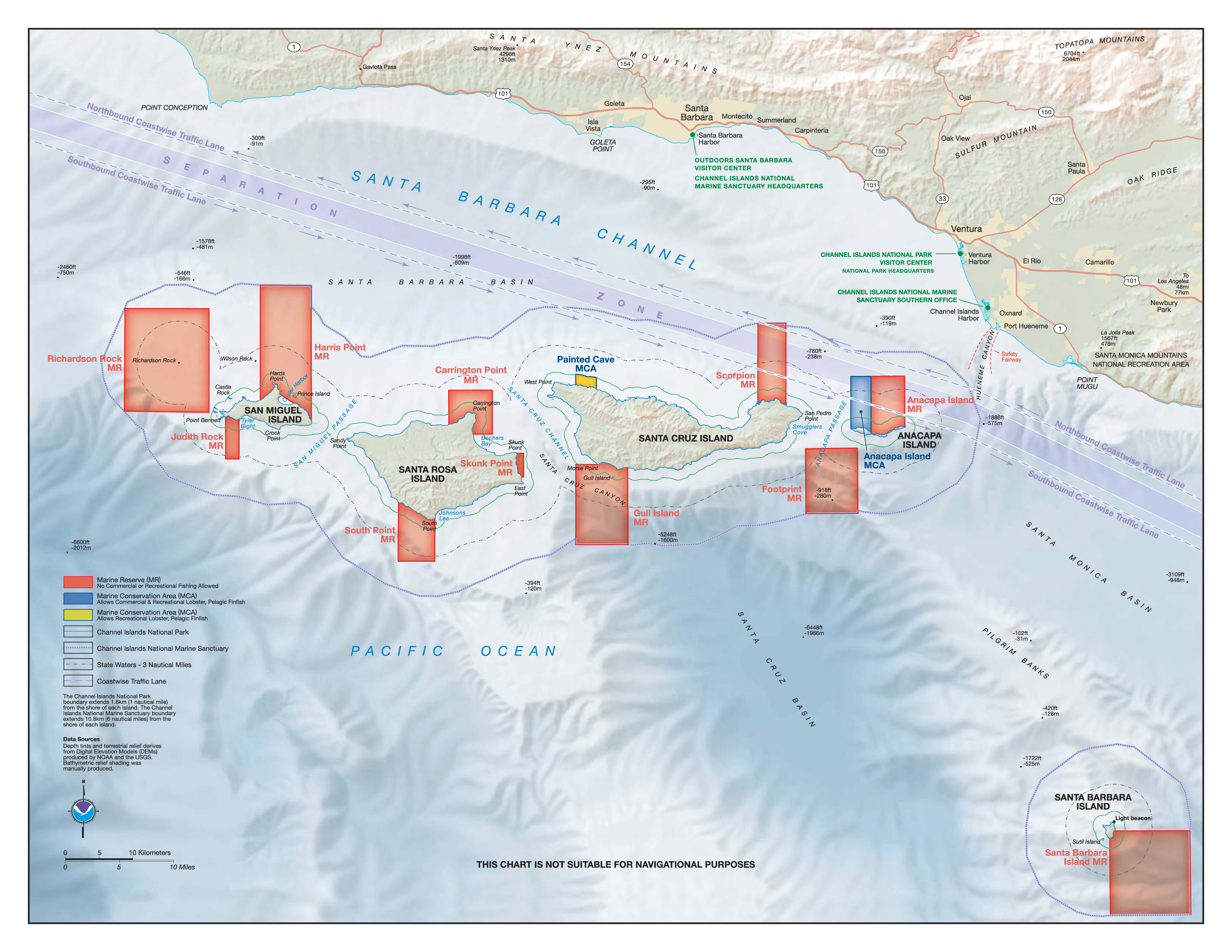
This map shows all the marine reserve areas around the Santa Barbara Channel islands, where fishing is not permitted. Also labeled are marine conservation areas and visitor centers on the mainland.

Marine protected areas (MPAs) have become an increasingly prominent tool for reef management. MPAs promote responsible fishery management and habitat protection. Much like national parks and wildlife refuges, and to varying degrees, MPAs restrict potentially damaging activities. MPAs encompass both social and biological objectives, including reef restoration, aesthetics, biodiversity and economic activity. MPAs have not been universally accepted. Conflicts relate to lack of participation, clashing views, effectiveness and funding. Many MPAs offer inadequate protection for coral reefs. Only 27% of coral reefs are in MPAs globally. Only 15% of MPA sites were considered effective, with 38% partially effective and 47% ineffective. This leaves only 6% of coral reefs in effectively managed MPAs. In some situations, as in Kiribati's Phoenix Islands Protected Area, MPAs provide revenue that is potentially equal to the income they would have generated without controls.

Biosphere reserve, marine park, national monument and world heritage status can protect reefs. For example, Belize's Barrier reef, Chagos Archipelago, Sian Ka'an, the Galápagos Islands, Great Barrier Reef, Henderson Island, Palau and Papahānaumokuākea Marine National Monument are world heritage sites. The Parcel de Manuel Luís Marine State Park protects the largest coral reef in the South Atlantic. This became a Ramsar Site in February 2000.

In Australia, the Great Barrier Reef is protected by the Great Barrier Reef Marine Park, and is the subject of much legislation, including a biodiversity action plan.

Inhabitants of Ahus Island, Manus Province, Papua New Guinea, have followed a generations-old practice of restricting fishing in six areas of their reef lagoon. Their cultural traditions allow line fishing, but not net or spear fishing. The result is both the biomass and individual fish sizes are significantly larger than in places where fishing is unrestricted.

== See also ==
- Environmental issues with coral reefs
- Coral Reef Alliance
- Seacology
- Great Barrier Reef Marine Park
- Marine cloud brightening
- Frozen zoo
- National Ice Core Laboratory
- Amphibian Ark
- Svalbard Global Seed Vault
- Rosetta Project
