= NICL =

NICL may refer to:

- National Ice Core Laboratory of the United States Geological Survey
- National Insurance Company Limited of India
- North Iowa Cedar League, a high-school athletic conference in Iowa
- New International Division of Cultural Labor
