= NCRI =

NCRI may refer to:

- National Cancer Research Institute, United Kingdom
- National Coral Reef Institute, United States; see Coral reef organizations
- National Council of Resistance of Iran
- Network Contagion Research Institute, United States, identifies hate groups, misinformation etc.
