= Long Now Foundation =

American nonprofit organization

The Long Now Foundation
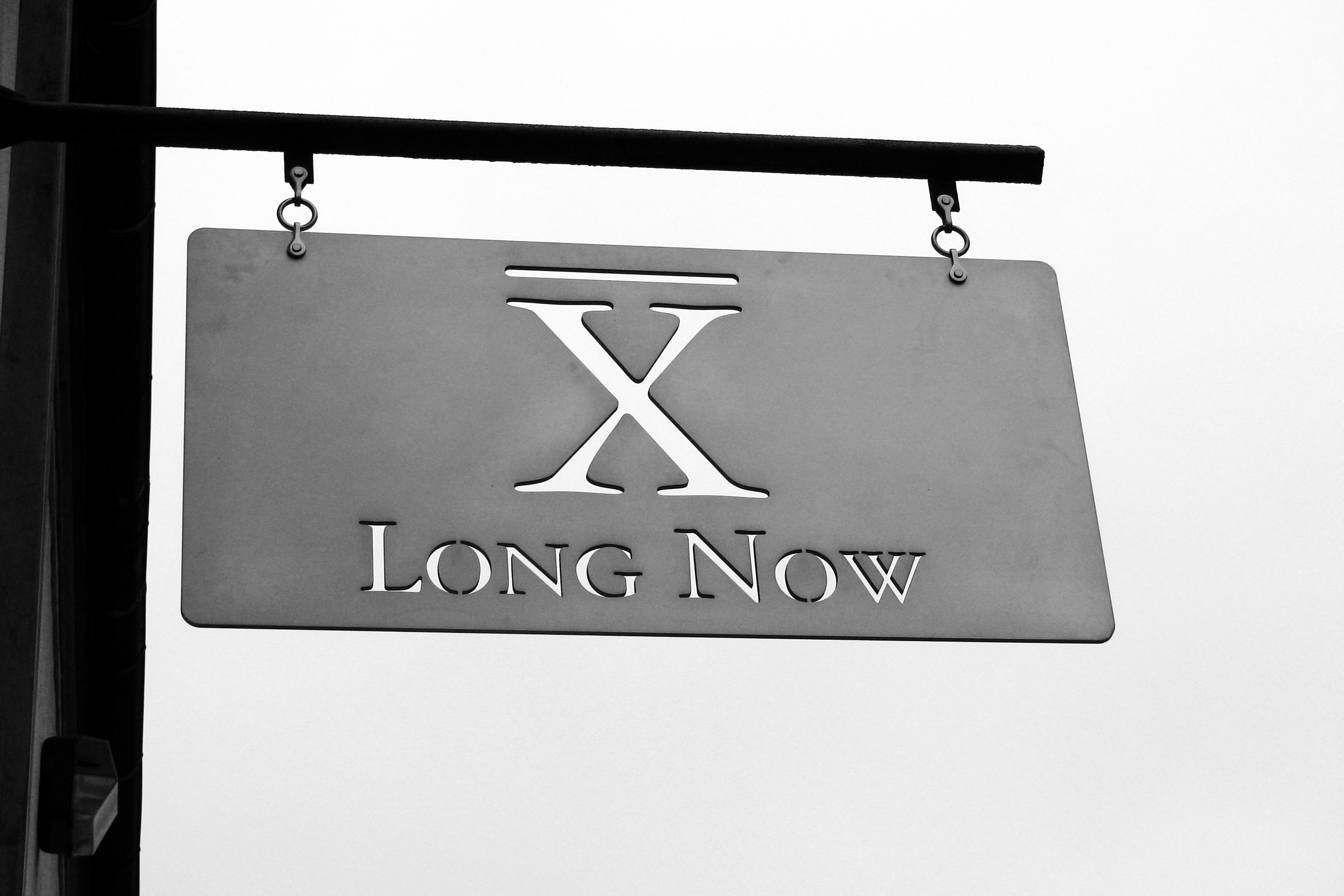
- Formation: January 4, 1996; 30 years ago
- Type: 501(c)(3)
- Tax ID no.: 68-0384748
- Registration no.: C1956835
- Headquarters: Fort Mason Center, San Francisco, California, US
- Coordinates: 37.8064591°N 122.4321258°W
- Key people: Cofounders Stewart Brand, Danny Hillis
- Website: longnow.org

The Long Now Foundation, established in 1996, is an American non-profit organization based in San Francisco that seeks to start and promote a long-term cultural institution. It aims to provide a counterpoint to what it views as today's "faster/cheaper" mindset and to promote "slower/better" thinking. The Long Now Foundation hopes to "creatively foster responsibility" in the framework of the next 10,000 years. In a manner somewhat similar to the Holocene calendar, the foundation uses 5-digit dates to address the year 10,000 problem (e.g., by writing the current year "02026" rather than "2026"). The organization's logo is X, a capital X with a vinculum (overline), a representation of 10,000 in Roman numerals.

== Projects ==
The foundation has several ongoing projects, including a 10,000-year clock known as the Clock of the Long Now, a cafe/bar called The Interval, and a popular seminar series, among others.

=== Clock of the Long Now ===
The purpose of the Clock of the Long Now is to construct a timepiece that will operate with minimum human intervention for ten millennia. It is to be constructed of durable materials, to be easy to repair, and to be made of largely valueless materials in case knowledge of the clock is lost or it is deemed to be of no value to an individual or possible future civilization; in this way it is hoped that the Clock will not be looted or destroyed. Its power source (or sources) should be renewable but similarly unlootable. A prototype of a potential final clock candidate was activated on December 31, 1999, and is on display at the Science Museum in London. The Foundation is currently building the Clock of the Long Now in Van Horn, Texas.

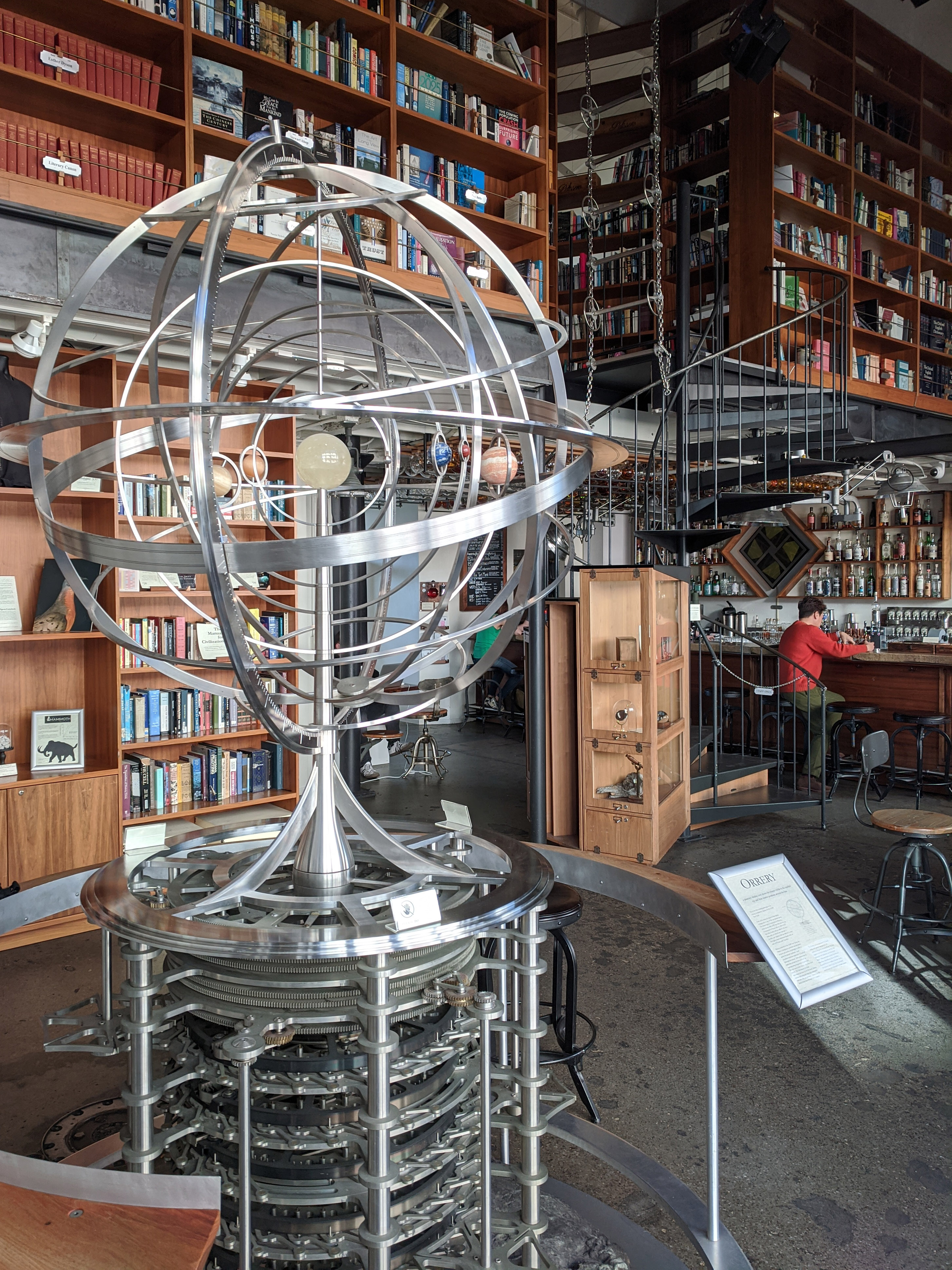
The Interval bar in Fort Mason, San Francisco

=== The Interval ===
Opened in June 2014, The Interval is a coffee shop and bar designed as social space in the foundation's 1930's-era Fort Mason facility in San Francisco. The purpose of The Interval is to have a public space where people can come together to discuss ideas and topics related to long-term thinking, as well as provide a venue for a variety of Long Now events. The Interval includes lounge furniture, artifacts from the foundation's projects, a library of the 1000 most important books for restarting civilization in the event of collapse, audio/video equipment, robots, art pieces, and a bar serving tea and coffee during the day, and cocktails during the night. Donors of a certain level can have a bottle of locally-made whiskey or gin from St. George's Spirits hanging from the ceiling, with the gin made using juniper berries of the very long-lived bristlecone pine.

In October 2014 The Interval was named by Thrillist as one of the 21 best new bars in America. Coffee blog Sprudge described it as a 'steampunk wonderland'. The SF Chronicle described it as a place "where you'd feel just as comfortable writing a master's thesis as taking a date" that is also known for its cocktails. Axios described it as an 'eclectic bar, cafe, art museum' that is one of San Francisco's best bars.

=== Seminars about long-term thinking ===
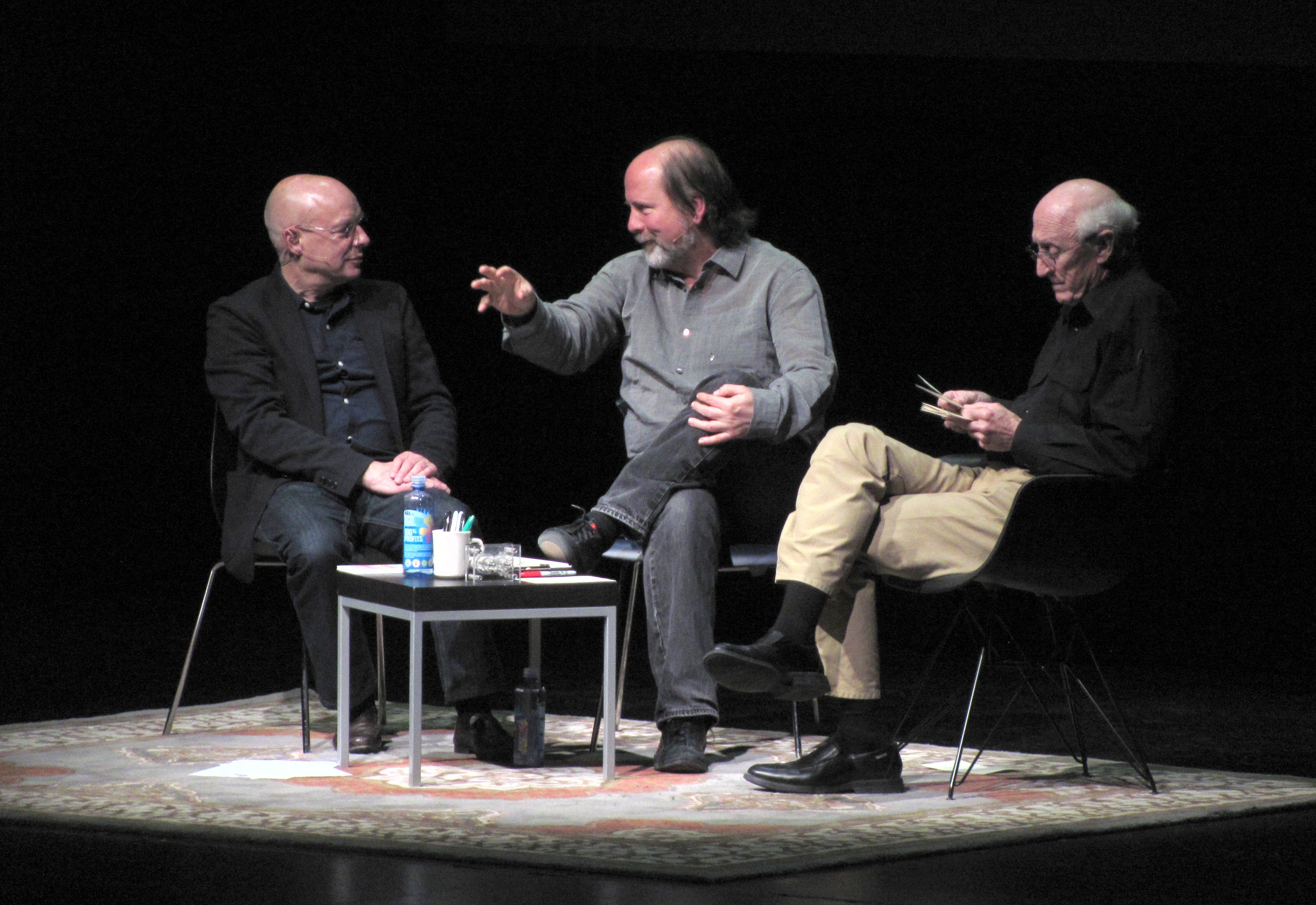
Brian Eno, Danny Hillis, and Stewart Brand speaking at "The Long Now, now" – an event in January 2014 at the Palace of Fine Arts in San Francisco

In November 2003, The Long Now Foundation began a series of monthly seminars about long-term thinking (SALT) with a lecture by Brian Eno. The seminars are held in the San Francisco Bay Area and have focused on long-term policy and thinking, scenario planning, singularity and the projects of the foundation. The seminars are available for download in various formats from The Long Now Foundation. They are intended to "nudge civilization toward making long-term thinking automatic and common". Topics have included preserving environmental resources, the deep past and deep future of the sciences and the arts, human life extension, the likelihood of an asteroid strike in the future, SETI, and the nature of time.

As of 2014, SFGate and Sprudge have described the seminars (hosted by Stewart Brand) as popular.

=== Rosetta Project ===
The Rosetta Project is an effort to preserve all languages that have a high likelihood of extinction over the period from 2000 to 2100. These include many languages whose native speakers number in the thousands or fewer. Other languages with many more speakers are considered by the project to be endangered because of the increasing importance of English as an international language of commerce and culture. Samples of such languages are to be inscribed onto a disc of nickel alloy three inches (7.62 cm) across. A Version 1.0 of the disc was completed on November 3, 2008, and as of 2017 housed 1,000 languages while working towards preserving 1,500.

=== Manual for Civilization ===
The Manual for Civilization is a living, crowd-curated library of over 3,500 books with the purpose of creating a record of humanity and technology for the current generation's descendants. The library is curated by the Long Now community and is on display at The Interval, Long Now's cafe-bar-salon in San Francisco.

Other projects include the Long Library, a library designed to cover the past 10,000 years and last for that long into the future; and Long Bets, a public prediction registry and accountability platform.

== In popular culture ==
Neal Stephenson's science fiction novel Anathem was partly inspired by the author's involvement with the Clock of the Long Now project.

As a result of Brian Eno's work on the clock project, an album entitled January 07003 / Bell Studies for The Clock of The Long Now was released in 2003. English songwriter Owen Tromans released a single entitled "Long Now", inspired by the foundation, in 2013.

Ian McEwan acknowledges the foundation for helping with much deep thinking about what we owe the future in his 2025 novel 'What We Can Know'. The novel centers around a lost poem (perhaps a masterpiece) and an academic's search for it roughly 150 years hence, when climate change has drowned much of the landscape referenced by the poem.

== Board members ==
The Board of Directors of The Long Now Foundation as of February 2026:

- Stewart Brand (Cofounder)
- Brian Eno
- Mick Costigan (Chair)
- Danica Remy (Secretary)
- Joe Speicher (Treasurer)
- Patrick Collison
- David Eagleman
- Kevin Kelly
- David Rumsey

Emeritus members

- Danny Hillis (Cofounder)
- Chris Anderson
- Doug Carlston
- Patrick Dowd
- Esther Dyson
- Ping Fu
- Katherine Fulton
- Mitch Kapor
- Michael Keller
- Roger Kennedy
- Kim Polese
- Alexander Rose
- Paul Saffo
- Peter Schwartz

== See also ==
- All Species Foundation
- Big History
- Deep time
- The Knowledge: How to Rebuild Our World from Scratch
- Longue durée
- Longplayer
- Longtermism
- Open Source Ecology
- Pioneer plaque
- Seven generation sustainability
- Voyager Golden Record
- Memory of Mankind
- Long-term nuclear waste warning messages
