= Paul Saffo =

American technology forecaster (born 1954)

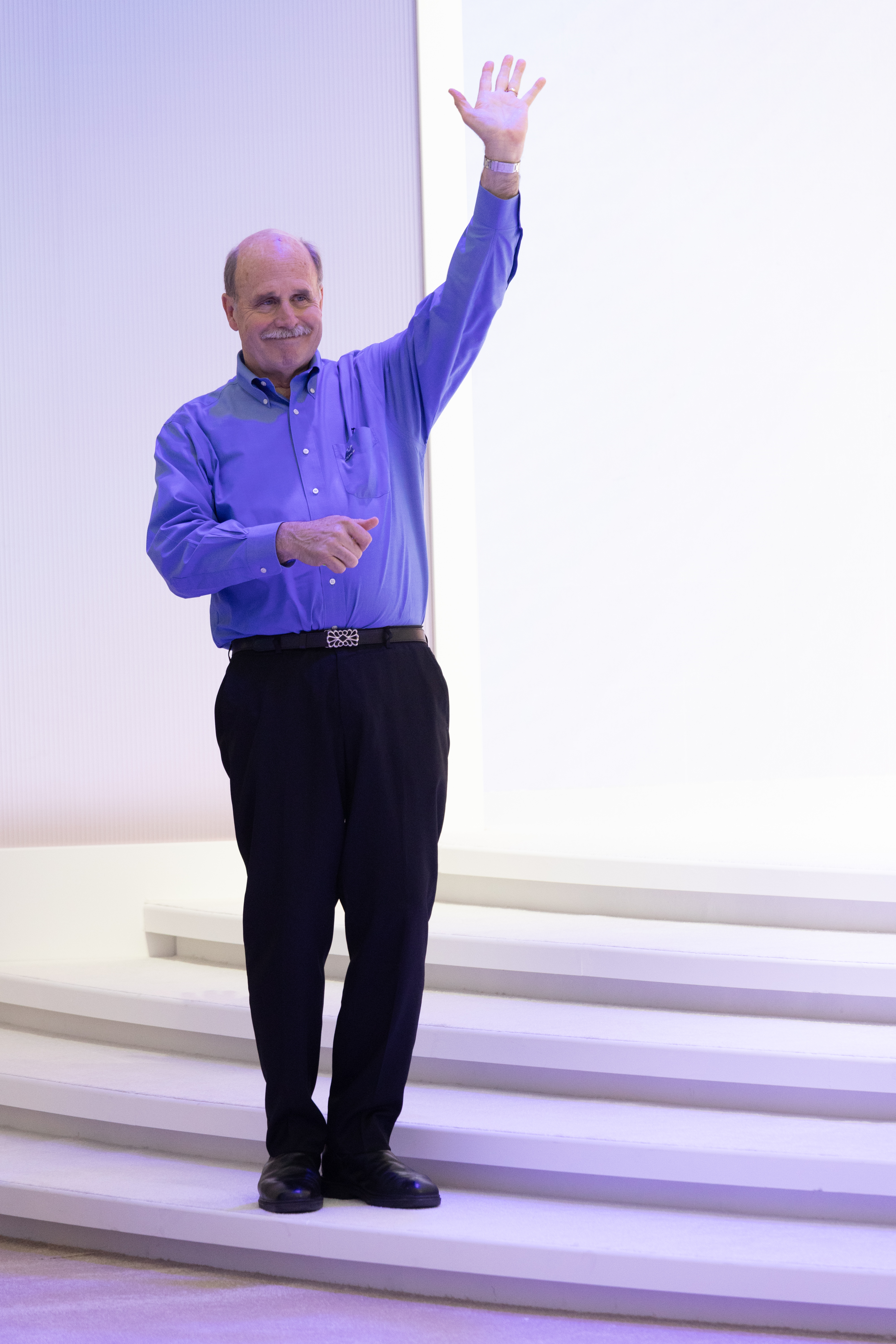
Saffo at the Dubai Future Forum (2024)

Paul Saffo (born 1954 in Los Angeles) is a futurist and technology forecaster based in Silicon Valley, California. A Consulting Professor in the School of Engineering at Stanford University, Saffo teaches courses on the future of engineering and the impact of technological change on the future. In 2008, Saffo was named Distinguished Visiting Scholar in the Stanford Media X research network.

He is a board member of the Long Now Foundation. He has degrees from Harvard College, Cambridge University, and Stanford University.

Saffo is the author of several books, including Dreams in Silicon Valley and The Road From Trinity, and the introduction to E.B. White: Notes on our Times.

Saffo was a McKinsey Judge for the Harvard Business Review in 1997, and was named a "Global Leader for Tomorrow" by the World Economic Forum in the same year. Saffo is Chairman of the Samsung Science Board, and serves on a variety of other boards and advisory panels, including the Stanford Advisory Council on Science, Technology and Society. Paul Saffo is a member of the CuriosityStream Advisory Board.

In 2000, Saffo was elected Fellow of the Royal Swedish Academy of Engineering Sciences.

Paul Saffo was initiated into the humorous "Ancient and Honorable Order of E Clampus Vitus" in 2009. He is the Chairman of the Most Important Committee.

In January 2025, Saffo predicted that "An AI-generated synthetic actor will win Best Supporting Actor at the 2035 Academy Awards."
