= HD-Rosetta =

Permanent data storage device

High-Density Rosetta (HD-Rosetta) is a permanent data storage device which contains engraved microscopic information on a small 3-inch (7.6 cm) nickel plate. Up to 196,000 8.5×11 in (22×28 cm) pages of information can be stored onto the plate using a focused ion beam. The image capacity for an HD-Rosetta disc can range from 10,000 to 100,000 images on a 4096 by 4096 pixel x vs. y plane. Similar to hieroglyphics and microfilm, HD-Rosetta is used for preserving information. Norsam Technologies has made HD-Rosetta extremely durable, compared to most archival data devices. It has an estimated longevity of 10,000 years, and it can withstand a minimum of 1000 years. HD-Rosetta has also been used for purposes other than archival. De Beers has currently used HD-Rosetta technology to provide clear marking on diamonds and other gemstones. HD-Rosetta does not require any specific software or operating systems to read the information: the information engraved onto the HD-Rosetta disc is easily accessed with a microscope.

== Writing process ==
To record information on HD-Rosetta, special formatting and tools must be used during the writing process. First, information is converted to digital format, or Norsam Technologies receives information in digital format. Digital format is required so the information can be written in micrometers, pixel by pixel, by the focused ion beam. The focused ion beam forces gallium ions down the main chamber and onto the surface of contact. At the point of contact, atoms from the nickel surface of HD-Rosetta are knocked off the plate; essentially, an etch is made. After lightly milling or doping the surface, the mills are chemically treated. This speeds up the writing process by 100 times.

== Reading process ==
While HD-Rosetta disc can be accessed with a microscope, depending on the size of the etchings, different types of microscopes may be needed. For more than 196,000 pages, a scanning electron microscope would be utilized. For between 5,000 and 180,000 pages, an optical microscope would be used. To locate information rapidly, Norsam Technologies has developed a special HD-Rosetta reader to locate x,y,z coordinates. By typing a page number, the HD-Rosetta reader can locate the appropriate information and display it on a screen.

== History ==
HD-Rosetta was first developed in the Los Alamos National Laboratory. The purpose was to develop a permanent data storage disc that would withstand nuclear war. Primarily focusing on archiving information, HD-Rosetta is thought as a method for preserving history. In 1999, The New York Times used HD-Rosetta for their "Times Capsule". Their HD-Rosetta disk contains six New York Times Millennium issues. The disk, along with acid-free archival paper, was put in a container filled with argon gas. Hoping to increase longevity of the disk and capsule, the subcontainer was suspended in thermal-gel insulation. The Times Capsule, along with an HD-Rosetta disc, currently resides in the American Museum of Natural History.

In a direct analogy to its namesake, the Rosetta spacecraft carried a micro-etched pure nickel prototype of the Rosetta disc donated by the Long Now Foundation. The disc was inscribed with 6,500 pages of language translations. The Rosetta spacecraft, with the Rosetta disc launched on 2 March 2004. On 6 August 2014, the spacecraft reached the comet 67P/Churyumov–Gerasimenko. On 30 September 2016, the Rosetta spacecraft ended its mission by hard-landing on the comet in its Ma'at region. The Rosetta disc, Rosetta spacecraft and comet are now all on a 6.44 yr orbit around the Sun.

=== Rosetta Project ===
Recently, the Long Now Foundation has begun the Rosetta Project, an archival project wishing to preserve history onto HD-Rosetta. This project seeks to gather important information and preserve the human language onto HD-Rosetta. The Long Now Foundation has entered languages, collections of literature, known cures for diseases, and blueprints for technology on the Rosetta Disc.

=== Norsam Technologies ===
Norsam Technologies currently holds the patent for HD-Rosetta. Founded on 5 October 1995, Norsam Technologies was first developed by John Bishop and two Los Alamos researchers, Roger Stutz and Dr. Bruce Lamartine. Using HD-Rosetta technology, Norsam Technologies and De Beers have cross-licensed to provide clear markings on diamonds and other gemstones.

== Advantages ==
HD-Rosetta advantages include:

- Sustainability: Since HD-Rosetta is made of nickel, it will never be affected by electromagnetic radiation.
- Durability: HD-Rosetta can withstand temperatures of up to 500 °C (932 °F), and can last at least 1,000 years.
- Withstands technical obsolescence: HD-Rosetta does not require any specific software or operating systems to read. If data is written in analog format, data can be easily translated.
- Minimal processing time: It takes one-tenth of a second to etch a page onto HD-Rosetta. In two hours, Norsam's automated machines can etch about 7,000 pages onto the disc.
- Images: With the use of a focused ion beam, images and characters can be written by varying the time each pixel is milled for.
- Size: For a small size, it can store large amounts of data.

== Disadvantages ==
HD-Rosetta disadvantages include:

- Limited accessibility: For high data densities, a scanning electron microscope would be required.
- Size: HD-Rosetta can easily be lost.
- Inconvenient: A focused ion beam is required to write data and a scanning electron microscope is required to read high density data. This technology is relatively large and expensive.

== See also ==
- Digital preservation
- Data storage
- Lingua Libre
