= Reef Ball Foundation =

Non-profit organization to promote artificial reef building

Reef Ball Foundation, Inc.
- Founded: 1993
- Founders: Todd Barber, Kathy Kirbo, Larry Beggs, Eric Krasle, Jay Jorgensen, and Laura Shellhorse
- Type: 501(c)(3)
- Tax ID no.: 65-0785751
- Purpose: Ocean ecosystem repair
- Location: Athens, Georgia, US
- Revenue: $226,826 (2019)
- Volunteers: 400 (2019)
- Website: reefballfoundation.org

Reef Ball Foundation, Inc. is a 501(c)(3) non-profit organization that functions as an international environmental non-governmental organization. The foundation uses reef ball artificial reef technology, combined with coral propagation, transplant technology, public education, and community training to build, restore and protect coral reefs. The foundation has established "reef ball reefs" in 59 countries. Over 550,000 reef balls have been deployed in more than 4,000 projects.

== History ==
Reef Ball Development Group was founded in 1993 by Todd Barber, with the goal of helping to preserve and protect coral reefs for the benefit of future generations. Barber witnessed his favorite coral reef on Grand Cayman destroyed by Hurricane Gilbert, and wanted to do something to help increase the resiliency of eroding coral reefs. Barber and his father patented the idea of building reef substrate modules with a central inflatable bladder, so that the modules would be buoyant, making them easy to deploy by hand or with a small boat, rather than requiring heavy machinery.

Over the next few years, with the help of research colleagues at University of Georgia, Nationwide Artificial Reef Coordinators and the Florida Institute of Technology (FIT), Barber, his colleagues, and business partners worked to perfect the design. In 1997, Kathy Kirbo established The Reef Ball Foundation, Inc as a non-profit organization with original founders being Todd Barber as chairman and charter member, Kathy Kirbo founding executive director, board secretary, and charter member, Larry Beggs as vice president and a charter member and Eric Krasle as treasurer and a charter member, Jay Jorgensen as a charter member. Reef balls can be found in almost every coastal state in the United States, and on every continent including Antarctica. The foundation has expanded the scope of its projects to include coral rescue, propagation and transplant operations, beach restorations, mangrove restorations and nursery development. Reef Ball also participates in education and outreach regarding environmental stewardship and coral reefs.

In 2001, Reef Ball Foundation took control of the Reef Ball Development Group, and operates all aspects of the business as a non-profit organization. By 2007, the foundation has deployed 550,000 reef balls worldwide.

In 2019, Reef Ball Foundation deployed 1,400 reef balls in the shores of Progreso, Yucatán in Mexico. Artificial reefs were also built in Quintana Roo, Baja California, Colima, Veracruz, and Campache. Almost 25,000 reef balls have been established in the surrounding seas of Mexico.

== Technology and research ==
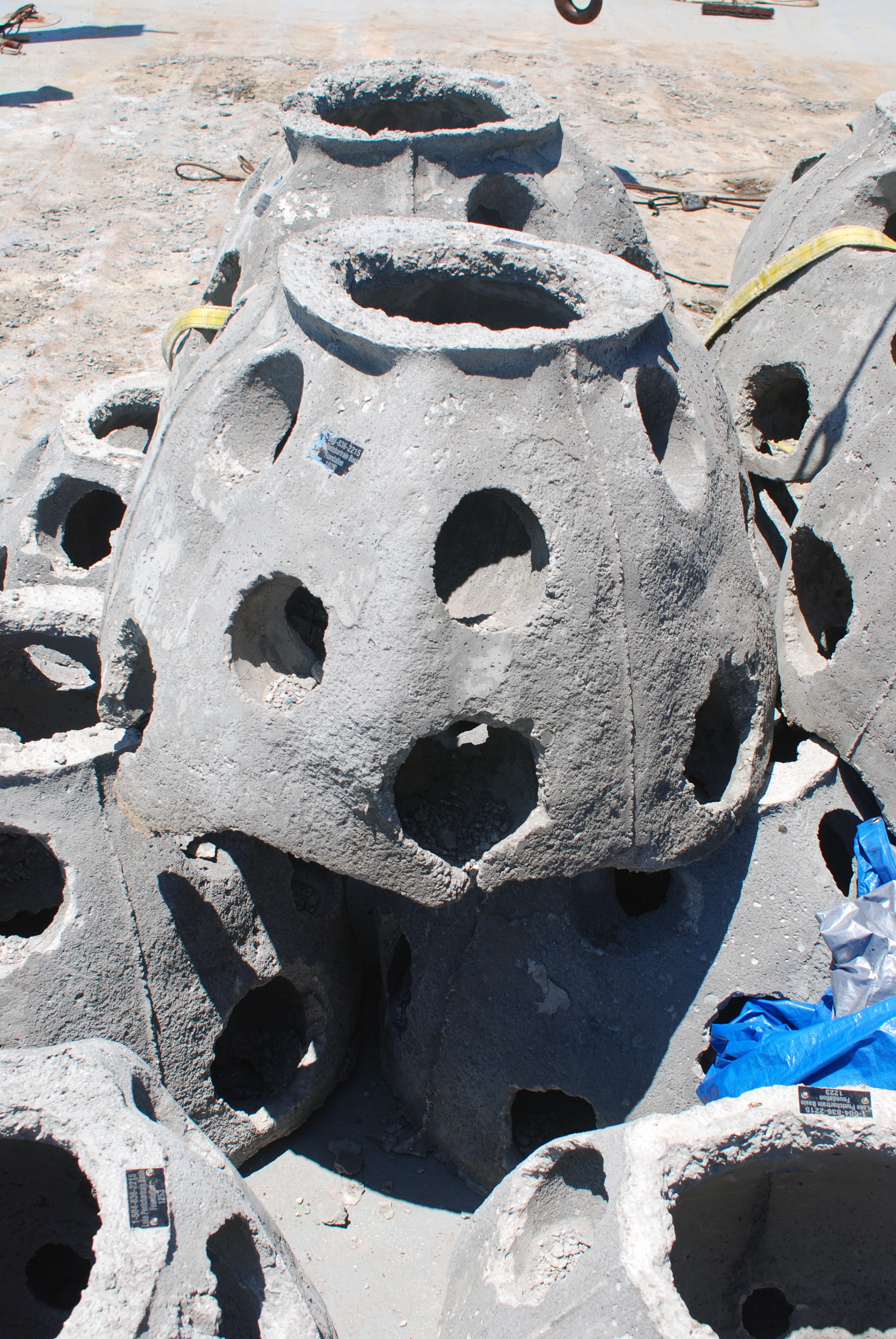
Reef balls

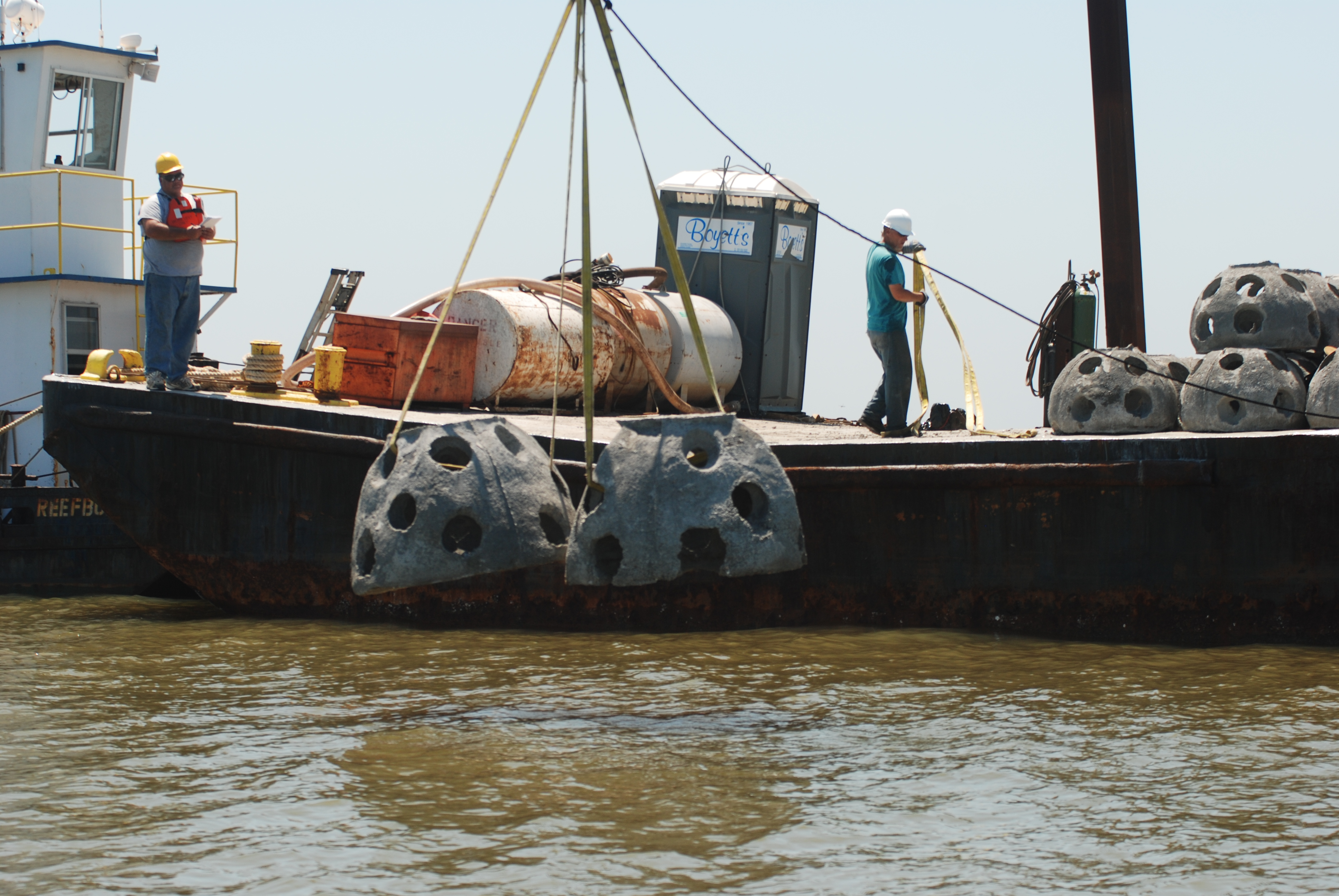
Reef balls, lowering into Lake Pontchartrain, Louisiana, US, 2009

The Reef Ball Foundation manufactures reef balls for open ocean deployment in sizes from 0.3 to 2.5 metres (1 to 8 ft) in diameter and 15 to 3,500 kilograms (30 to 8,000 lb) in weight. Reef balls are hollow, and typically have several convex-concave holes of varying sizes to most closely approximate natural coral reef conditions by creating whirlpools. Reef balls are made from pH-balanced microsilica concrete, and are treated to create a rough surface texture, in order to promote settling by marine organisms such as corals, algae, coralline algae and sponges.

Over the last decade, research has been conducted with respect to the ability of artificial reefs to produce or attract biomass, the effectiveness of reef balls in replicating natural habitat, and mitigating disasters. The use of reef balls as breakwaters and for beach stabilization has been extensively studied.

== Projects ==
The foundation undertakes an array of projects including artificial reef deployment, estuary restoration, mangrove plantings, oyster reef creation, coral propagation, natural disaster recovery, erosion control, and education.

Notable projects include:

- In Antigua, undertaking 4,700 modules were deployed around the island.
- In Malaysia, 5,000 reef balls were deployed around protected sea turtle nesting islands to deter netting, successfully increasing nesting numbers.
- In Campeche, Mexico, over 4,000 reef balls deployed by local fishing communities to enhance fishery resources.
- In Tampa Bay, US, reef balls were installed beneath docks, in front of sea walls, and as a submerged breakwater to create oyster reefs.
- In Phuket, Thailand, reef balls were planted with corals after the Boxing Day Tsunami to help restore tourism.
- In Indonesia, locals and P.T. Newmont used reef balls to mitigate damage from mining operations and restore thousands of coral heads.
- In Australia, reef balls have been used to enhance fisheries in New South Wales.

=== Designed artificial reefs ===
The trend in artificial reef development has been toward the construction of designed artificial reefs, built from materials specifically designed to function as reefs. Designed systems (such as reef balls) can be modified to achieve a variety of goals. These include coral reef rehabilitation, fishery enhancement, snorkeling and diving trails, beach erosion protection, surfing enhancement, fish spawning sites, planters for mangrove replanting, enhancement of lobster fisheries, creation of oyster reefs, estuary rehabilitation, and even exotic uses such as deep water Oculina coral replanting. Designed systems can overcome many of the problems associated with "materials of opportunity" such as stability in storms, durability, biological fit, lack of potential pollution problems, availability, and reduction in long-term artificial reef costs.

Designed reefs have been developed specifically for coral reef rehabilitation, and can therefore be used in a more specific niche than materials of opportunity. Some examples of specialized adaptations which "designed reefs" can use include: specialized surface textures, coral planting attachment points, specialized pH-neutral surfaces (such as neutralized concrete, ceramics, or mineral accretion surfaces), fissures to create currents for corals, and avoidance of materials such as iron (which may cause algae to overgrow coral). Other types of designed systems can create aquaculture opportunities for lobsters, create oyster beds, or be used for a large variety of other specialized needs.

== See also ==
- Underwater sculptures
- Project AWARE
- Reef Check
