= Lewis Dartnell =

British author

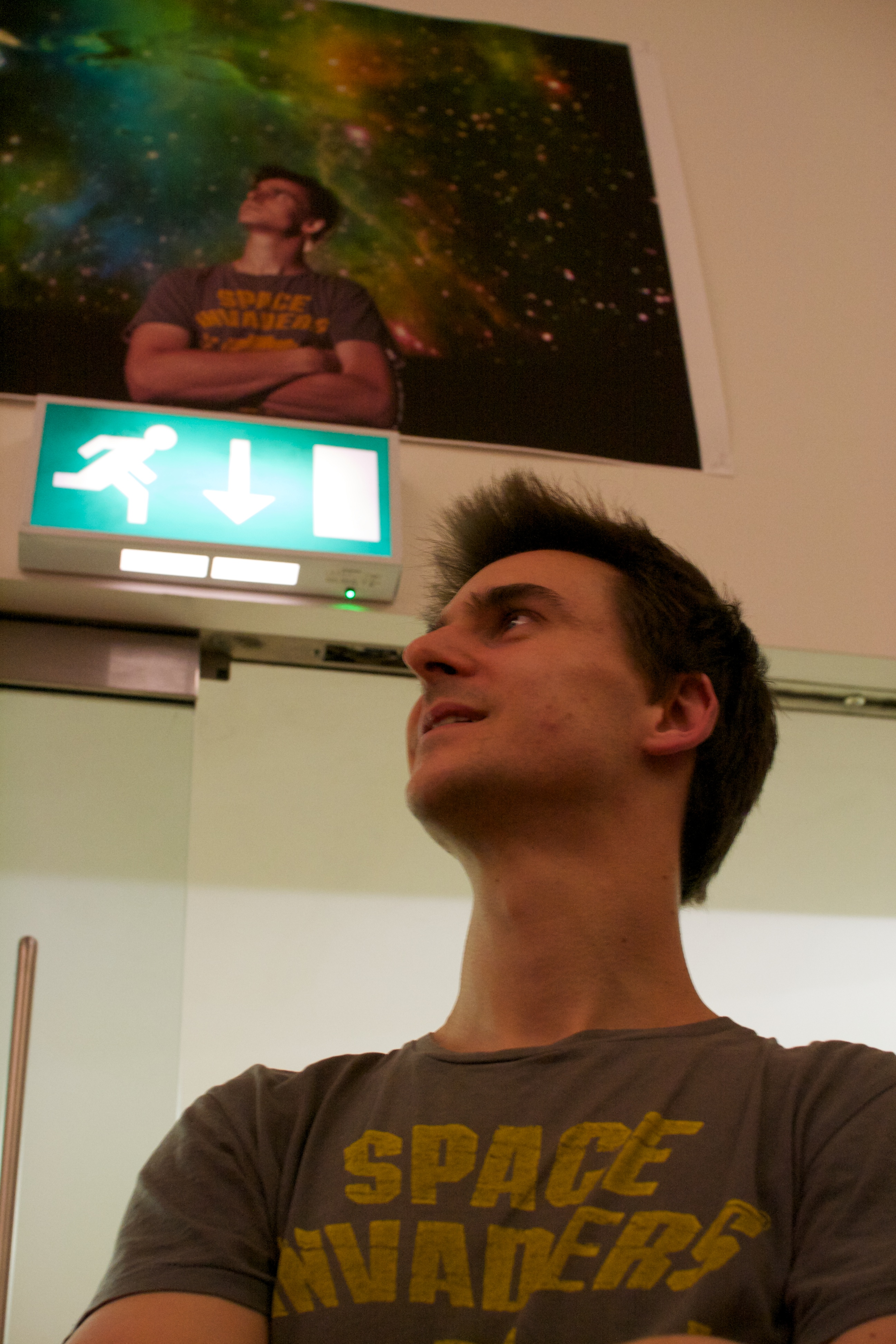
Lewis Dartnell (2010)

Lewis Ryan Dartnell (born 21 November 1974) is a British astrobiologist, presenter, and professor of science communication at the University of Westminster. His works of popular science include The Knowledge: How to Rebuild our World from Scratch and Origins, which looks at how geology has impacted human history.

== Early life and education ==
Dartnell was born in the UK, but spent much of his childhood years abroad, as his father was posted overseas while working as an engineer for British Airways. He was educated at Charterhouse, in Surrey, and obtained a degree in biology from the University of Oxford. He completed his Doctor of Philosophy in Astrobiology at University College London. His thesis, Computer modeling and experimental work on the astrobiological implications of the Martian subsurface ionising radiation environment, was subsequently reprinted under the title of Martian Death Rays.

== Career ==
=== Research ===
Dartnell was a UK Space Agency research fellow at the University of Leicester, where his research focused on the study of extremophile microbes and their signs of past or present life, including the use of Raman spectroscopy to detect micro-organisms even after they have been damaged by exposure to very high levels of radiation. As of 2017, he is a Professor of Science Communication at the University of Westminster.

=== Writing ===
Dartnell has written science articles for popular magazines including New Scientist, and was runner up for The Daily Telegraph Science Writer's Award in 2004. He has written several books, including Life in the Universe, an introductory book to the field of astrobiology, and The Knowledge: How to Rebuild our World from Scratch. 2019 saw the publication of Origins, which is an account of how the Earth has affected human evolution and civilizations.

Dartnell also contributed an essay on extraterrestrial life edited by Jim Al-Khalili.

=== Broadcasting ===
Dartnell has appeared in several science programmes for BBC radio and television, including guest appearances on The Sky at Night and StarGazing Live. He also presented at TED in March 2015 during Session 10: Building from Scratch.

== Personal life ==
Dartnell lives in the Stoke Newington area of London.

== Influence ==
Riichiro Inagaki, Tokyo-based author of the manga series Dr. Stone, references a Japanese translation of Dartnell's book The Knowledge: How to Rebuild Civilisation in the Aftermath of a Cataclysm as a consulted work.
