= International Marinelife Alliance =

Bangladesh-based non-profit organization

The International Marinelife Alliance (IMA) is a non-profit organization for marine conservation. It is based in Cox's Bazar, Bangladesh.

== Activities ==
The International Marinelife Alliance was established in 1985. Its philosophy includes:

- Fishers and fishing communities must be at the centre of marine conservation efforts.
- Market forces rule the reefs, and market transformation must be a part of saving them.
- Governments must be a key partner in coral reef conservation.
- Marine conservation efforts must be founded on good science.

Since its foundation the institution devoted most of its attention to monitoring and combating the widespread use of cyanide to capture live reef fish in the Philippines, Indonesia and other countries. In early 1990s, Destructive Fishing Reform Initiative (DFRI) was initiated to ensure that the remaining reefs of the Pacific Region do not fall prey to destruction from the cyanide-based fishery. In 1999, IMA organized preliminary field expertise of the live reef fish trade in Ha Long Bay and Nha Trang in Vietnam responding the request for assistance from the Vietnamese Government (Ministry of Fisheries). Later the Alliance signed a Memorandum of Understanding with the Institute for Fisheries Economics and Planning (IFEP) of the Vietnam Ministry of Fisheries for a cooperative program aiming to prevent destructive fishing, conserve marine resources and strengthen the monitoring in the live reef fish trade in Vietnam.
