= Reef Check =

International NGO for reef conservation

Reef Check Foundation
- Founded: 1996
- Founder: Gregor Hodgson
- Type: NGO
- Purpose: Ocean conservation
- Location: California, U.S.
- Region served: Global
- Method: Scientific research
- Revenue: Grants and donations
- Website: reefcheck.org

Reef Check is an international non-governmental organization dedicated to the conservation of two ecosystems: tropical coral reefs and temperate kelp forests. The Foundation is headquartered in California, United States, but uses data from volunteer scuba diver teams in over 80 countries, ranging from Australia, Japan, to even Germany. It is the United Nations’ official coral reef monitoring program.

== History ==
Reef Check first conducted a global survey of coral reef health in 1997. The data confirmed that coral reefs were in crisis due to overfishing, pollution and other human impacts. The published results in 1999 unsettled the coral biologist community, as the extent of impacts were not realized.

"The Global Coral Reef Crisis: Trends and Solutions (1997-2001)", a five-year report on coral reefs, was released in 2002 at the World Summit on Sustainable Development in Johannesburg, South Africa. The report used data collected by thousands of volunteers worldwide, and was the first scientific document detailing the decline in coral reef health over a five-year period.

In 2005, Reef Check launched its first temperate reef program in California, collecting data on California’s kelp forests with the goal to inform the emerging statewide Marine Protected Area (MPA) network. Since then, Reef Check’s Kelp Forest Monitoring Program has grown to be the largest scuba-based citizen science program.

In 2016, this program expanded into climate change monitoring and is now providing ocean temperature data from over 75 sites.

In 2020, Reef Check began working on restoring kelp forests, with the hope of reversing some of the devastating collapse of these ecosystems along the North American West Coast. The focus of this program is on community-based restoration by engaging volunteers and providing economic benefit to the local communities that depend on the ocean environment who are the most hard-hit by the loss of kelp in many regions.

Reef Check's Dive into Science program, launched in 2019, is designed to provide scuba and scientific diving skills for groups that have been historically absent in this effort, including tribes, low-income communities of color, and foster youth.

=== Mission and goals ===
Reef Check endeavors to create partnerships among communities, government agencies, businesses, universities and other non-profits. Reef Check's mission is "to empower people to save our reefs and oceans".

== Monitoring methods ==
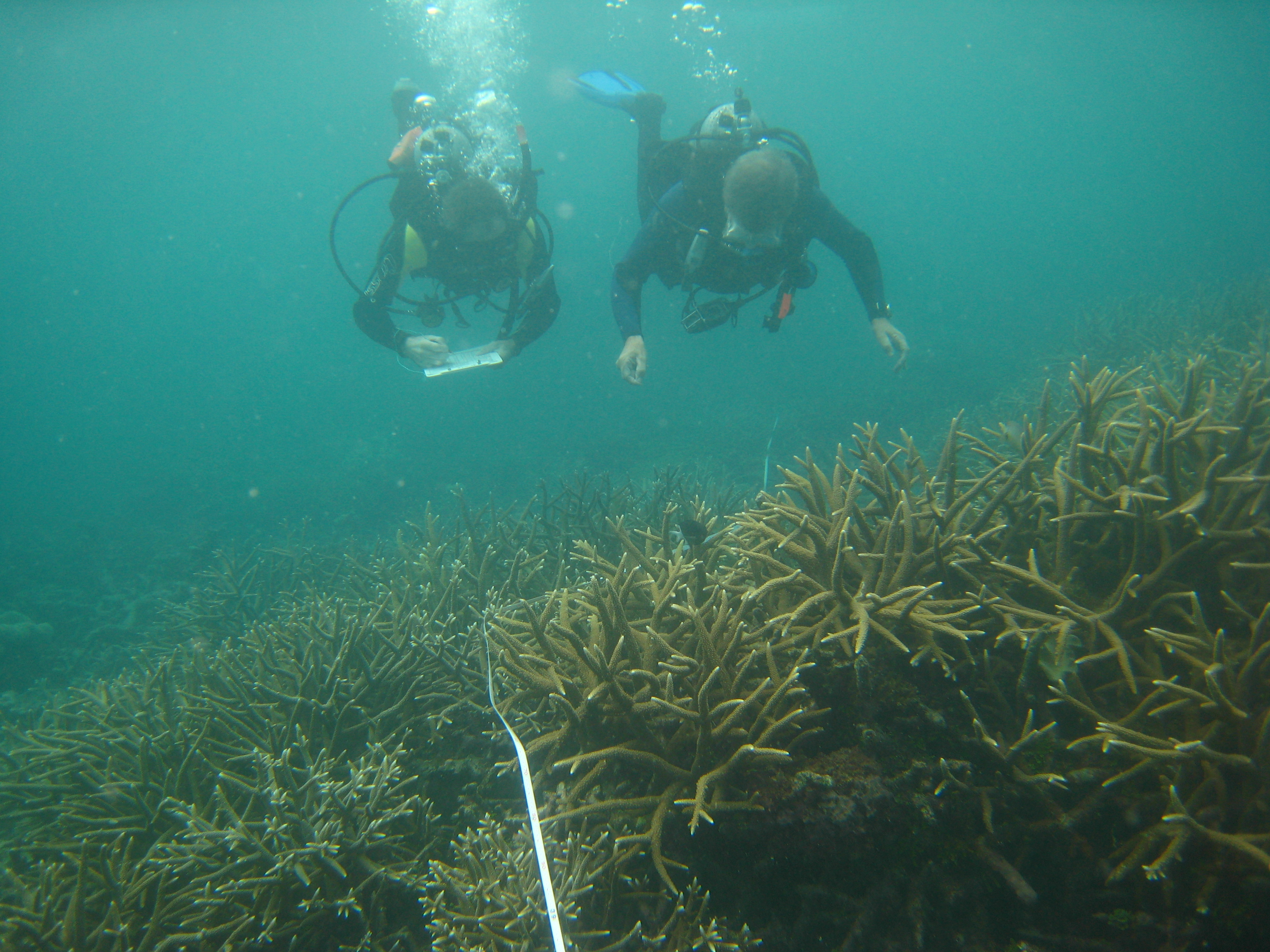
Divers performing a substrate survey on the Great Barrier Reef in 2008. Notice the transect tape.

For its coral reef monitoring protocol, Reef Check volunteer divers are trained to study a designated site annually or sometimes quarterly. Underwater surveyors focus chiefly on sessile invertebrates (benthos), along a 100-meter (330 ft) transect line.

Four spatial replicates (spanning 20 m (66 ft)) are studied with three 5 m (16 ft) gaps between. The survey is sub-divided to allow paired divers to separately observe substrate, photograph macroinvertebrates and impacts, record video, and count fishes. A site-specific description is also documented.

== Programs ==
Reef Check carries out its work through four major programs: the Coral Reef Program, Kelp Forest Program, Kelp Restoration Program, and Dive into Science Program.

== See also ==
- Project AWARE – International environmental nonprofit organization
- Commission on Sustainable Development (UNCSD) – Functional commission of the UN Economic and Social Council
- Coral Reef Alliance (CORAL) – Non-profit, environmental NGO focused on protecting coral reefs
- Reef Life Survey – Marine life monitoring programme based in Hobart, Tasmania
- Rubicon Foundation – American non-profit foundation
- SeaKeys – Collaborative marine biodiversity project in South Africa
- Shifting baseline – Type of change to how a system is measured
- Citizen science – Amateur scientific research
- Ecotourism – Touring natural habitats while minimizing environmental impact
