= Rosetta Project =

Language preservation project

- One goal of the project is the three-inch nickel Rosetta Disk, on which will be etched 13,000 microscopic pages of text.
- Mission statement: The Rosetta Project is a global collaboration of language specialists and native speakers working to build a publicly accessible digital library of human languages.
- Commercial?: No
- Type of project: Archival of human languages
- Products: Rosetta Disk
- Status: Active
- Website: rosettaproject.org

The Rosetta Project is a global collaboration of language specialists and native speakers working to develop a contemporary version of the historic Rosetta Stone. Run by the Long Now Foundation, the project aims to create a survey and near-permanent archive of 1,500 languages that can enable comparative linguistic research and education and might help recover or revitalize lost languages in the future.

The project works through an open-contribution, open-review process similar to the one that created the Oxford English Dictionary. The archive will be publicly available in three media: a HD-Rosetta micro-etched nickel alloy disc three inches (7.62 cm) across with a 2,000-year life expectancy; a single-volume monumental reference book; and a growing online archive.

== Concept ==
Fifty to ninety percent of the world's languages (in red) are predicted to disappear in the next century.

Half to 90 percent of the world's languages are predicted to disappear in the next century, many with little or no significant documentation. Some of these languages have fewer than one thousand speakers left. Others are considered to be dying out because language policy based on an official language is increasing the prevalence of major languages that are used as the medium of instruction in public schools and national media. (For example, Tok Pisin is "slowly crowding out" other languages of Papua New Guinea.)

Much linguistic description, especially the description of languages with few speakers, remains hidden in personal research files or poorly preserved in under-funded archives.

As part of the effort to secure this critical legacy of linguistic diversity, the Long Now Foundation plans a broad online survey and near-permanent physical archive of 1,500 of the approximately 7,000 human languages.

The project has three overlapping goals:

1. to create an unprecedented platform for comparative linguistic research and education;
2. to develop and widely distribute a functional linguistic tool that might help with the recovery of lost or compromised languages in unknown futures;
3. to offer an aesthetic object that suggests the immense diversity of human languages as well as the very real threats to the continued survival of this diversity.

The 1,500-language corpus expands on the parallel-text structure of the original Rosetta Stone through archiving ten descriptive components for each of the 1,500 selected languages.

The goal is an open source "Linux of Linguistics"—an effort of collaborative online scholarship drawing on the expertise and contributions of thousands of academic specialists and native speakers around the world. The project is also organising formal archive research groups at Stanford, Yale, Berkeley, the American Library of Congress, and the American Summer Institute of Linguistics (and its offices in Dallas).

The resulting Rosetta archives are publicly available in three different media:

1. a free and continually growing online archive, also available as a DVD;
2. a single-volume monumental reference book;
3. an extreme-longevity micro-etched disc.

In a direct analogy to its namesake, the Rosetta spacecraft carried a micro-etched pure nickel prototype of the Rosetta disc donated by the Long Now Foundation. The disc was inscribed with 6,500 pages of language translations. The Rosetta spacecraft, with the Rosetta disc launched on 2 March 2004. On 6 August 2014, the spacecraft reached the comet 67P/Churyumov–Gerasimenko. On 30 September 2016, the Rosetta spacecraft ended its mission by hard-landing on the comet in its Ma'at region. The Rosetta disc, Rosetta spacecraft and comet are now all on a 6.44 year orbit around the Sun.

A "Version 1.0" of the HD-Rosetta disc was completed on 3 November 2008. The disc contains over 13,000 pages of information using over 1,500 languages, which can be read after magnifying by 650 times with a microscope.

In early 2017, the Rosetta Wearable Disk was released. It was developed using a similar manufacturing process as the first edition of the Rosetta Disk, the main difference being that the final archive is about 2 cm (0.79 in) in diameter, thus enabling wearing as an ornament on the human body. One side has instructions in eight different languages and scripts (Bahasa Indonesia, English, Hindi, Mandarin, Modern Standard Arabic, Spanish, Swahili, and Russian), and the other an archive of over 1000 human languages assembled in 2016. By November 2017, the initial run of 100 disks had all been sold, but new releases are planned.

== See also ==
- All Species Foundation, another project of the foundation
- Intercontinental Dictionary Series
- Endangered language
- Language death
- Language revitalization
- Time capsule
- Lingua Libre
- Frozen zoo
- National Ice Core Laboratory
- Amphibian Ark
- Svalbard Global Seed Vault
