= Amphibian Ark =

International conservation organization

The Amphibian Ark (or AArk) is an organization that focuses on the conservation of amphibian populations by planning and implementing ex situ programs in zoos and wildlife organizations around the world.

== Background ==
The Amphibian Ark (or AArk) was formed in 2007 by three principal partners: the World Association of Zoos and Aquariums (WAZA), the IUCN/SSC Conservation Planning Specialist Group (CBSG), and the IUCN/SSC Amphibian Specialist Group (ASG) in response to extreme declines in wild amphibian populations.

The AArk was formed to address and carry out the ex situ components of the Amphibian Conservation Action Plan (ACAP). Specifically, the AArk was formed to establish, maintain, and assist captive populations of amphibian species, focusing on those that cannot be safeguarded in nature, with the goal of using these collections to stabilize or re-establish wild populations. To accomplish its mission, Amphibian Ark’s staff coordinate ex situ amphibian programs implemented by partners around the world, with the first emphasis on programs within the range countries of the species, and the second emphasis on housing species separately from those outside of its native range.

Although action to save critical species from immediate extinction will be to send them to facilities with space and expertise, the goal is to enable the range countries currently lacking facilities and expertise to care for their own species. This will allow outside experts to free up their time and space to begin the process anew with other species in other regions of the world.

Members of the AArk include WAZA members and WAZA affiliates, members of regional or national zoo associations, Species360, AArk approved private partners, and AArk approved museums, universities and wildlife agencies. An AArk Steering Committee, with Executive Co-Chairs from each of the three principal partners, provides guidance on the activities of the AArk and ensures communication with stakeholders. In addition, Advisory Committees have been formed to consult on species-specific issues, for example, reintroduction, gene banking, and veterinary, legal, and ethical concerns.

A number of dedicated positions coordinate implementation within the AArk initiative; assist AArk partners in priority taxa identifying and regions for ex situ conservation work; lead development and implementation of training programs for building capacity of individuals and institutions; and develop communications strategies, newsletters and other messages, and materials to promote understanding and action on behalf of amphibian conservation.

== The Need for Amphibian Conservation ==
It is estimated that at least thirty percent of amphibian species are currently at risk of going extinct, though some estimates put this figure closer to forty percent. The threats to amphibian populations are diverse, but predominantly anthropogenic, including over-exploitation, habitat loss, introduction of invasive species, and pollution. Other factors include the emergence of new pathogens and climate change.

Organizations such as AArk aim to protect amphibians against these threats, due to the important roles amphibians have in their ecosystems, such as nutrient cycling and energy flow. They are also used by humans as a source of food and medicine, in addition to becoming more popular in the pet trade.

== Criteria for the AArk ==
Due to limited resources, not every threatened species of amphibian can be held in captivity. As a result, the AArk and its partners created a resource called the Amphibian Conservation Needs Assessment, which is used to prioritize conservation efforts for different species and determine what methods are appropriate for conserving the species. The assessment is composed of twenty six questions, which are divided into seven sections. The seven sections are as follows: Review of External Data, Status in the Wild, Threats and Recovery, Significance, Ex situ Activity, Education, and Ex situ Program Authorization and Availability.

There are eleven possible conservation roles that are given to each species that is evaluated by the assessment. These roles are as follows: Ark, Rescue, In situ Conservation, In situ research, Husbandry research, Applied Ex situ Research, Mass Production in Captivity, Conservation Education, Supplementation, Biobanking, and doing nothing. The AArk plays the greatest role in the species deemed appropriate for the Ark and Rescue roles. The Ark role is given to species that exist only in captivity and are extinct in the wild, while the Rescue role is given to species that are at a significant risk of becoming extinct in the wild.

As of 2018, the Conservation Needs Assessment had been used in nearly 2,700 assessments for more than 2,300 species of amphibians, or about 31% of all known amphibian species. These assessments focused on anurans at almost 2,400 assessments, while newts and salamanders made up nearly 300 of the assessments, and caecilians made up only about 30. In 2015, 801 species were prioritized for rescue or ex situ research Many of these species were listed as near threatened or least concern, but have similar life histories to threatened species, and were prioritized with the goal of developing husbandry guidelines for threatened species.

== Controversies of the Ark Model ==
Throughout the existence of the AArk, a number of concerns were raised by members of the scientific community regarding the project. First, it was determined that many species of amphibians that meet the AArk’s criteria for an ex situ program are difficult to maintain and breed in captivity. Others were concerned about the logistics and diplomacy regarding a conservation project that emphasizes the importance of establishing these programs in a species’ country of origin.

Another concern about the AArk is simply its effectiveness in the conservation of endangered species. Despite the AArk’s work since its conception, zoos and other facilities still disproportionately focus on the conservation of reptiles, mammals, and birds, as opposed to amphibians. A study published in 2015 found that only 2.9% of all globally threatened amphibian species were represented in zoos, as opposed to 23% of globally threatened mammals, 22.1% of globally threatened reptiles, and 15.6% of globally threatened bird species. This study did point out that the AArk's contribution to ex situ conservation might be misrepresented by this data due to diplomacy issues resulting from the AArk's emphasis on establishing ex situ work in countries within the range of each species.

== See also ==
- Svalbard Global Seed Vault
- National Ice Core Laboratory
- Frozen zoo
- Coral reef organizations
- Rosetta Project
