= The Knowledge: How to Rebuild Our World from Scratch =

2014 book by Lewis Dartnell

- First edition
- Author: Lewis Dartnell
- Language: English
- Genre: Nonfiction: Reference work; Popular science
- Publisher: The Bodley Head
- Publication date: 3 April 2014
- Publication place: United Kingdom
- Media type: Print (hardcover and paperback), audiobook, e-book
- Pages: 341
- ISBN: 978-1-84792-227-4

The Knowledge: How to Rebuild Our World from Scratch is a nonfiction reference work written by astrobiologist Lewis Dartnell. It was published in hardback by The Bodley Head in the United Kingdom on 3 April 2014 and by The Penguin Press in the United States on 17 April 2014. The UK paperback was released by Vintage on 5 March 2015 while the US paperback, retitled The Knowledge: How to Rebuild Civilization in the Aftermath of a Cataclysm, was published on 10 March 2015 by Penguin Books.

The book is written as a quick-start guide to restarting civilization following a global catastrophe.

== Synopsis ==
The book describes how humanity and civilization works, and how it could be altered in the event of worldwide disaster, such as avian flu. Dartnell describes what knowledge would be needed to rebuild civilization as we know it, looking at the history of science and technology.

Dartnell describes a possible 'grace period' in which survivors could salvage food, materials and tools from the ruins of society. However, after a certain point this grace period would end, and humanity would have to produce their own food, make their own tools, practice hygiene and fight infection to maintain health, and develop energy stores for a new society to survive the aftermath.

The book covers topics including agriculture, food and clothing, substances, medicine, and transport. Dartnell argues that applying the scientific method to basic knowledge would enable an advanced technological society to reappear within several generations.

== Reception ==
=== Reviews ===
The Times called the book "an extraordinary achievement", and "a great read even if civilization does not collapse". The Guardian described the book as a "terrifically engrossing history of science and technology". Choice: Current Reviews for Academic Libraries described the book as "highly readable and engaging". The Daily Telegraph described it as an "entertaining instruction manual for the end of the world", albeit jarring when "it seems Dartnell is taking this end-of-the-world stuff seriously".

=== Awards ===
The book was awarded The Sunday Times "New Thinking" Book of the Year in 2014, and The Times Science Book of the Year the same year. It was awarded Best Science Books of 2014 by io9.
