= National Science Foundation Ice Core Facility =

US storage site for frozen water samples

Coordinates: 39°42′50″N 105°07′32″W

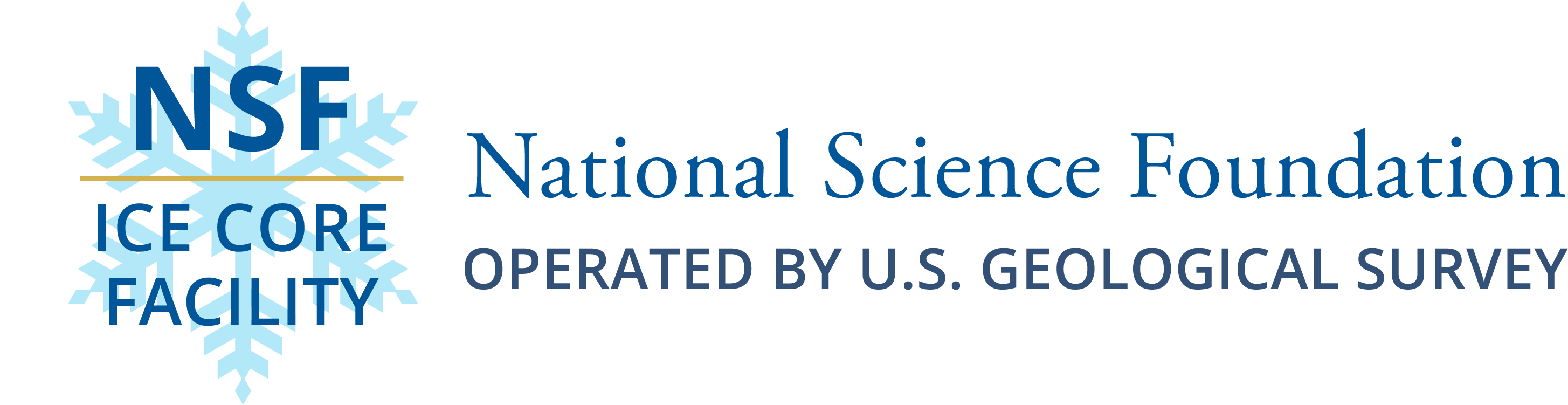
- Logo of the NSF-ICF

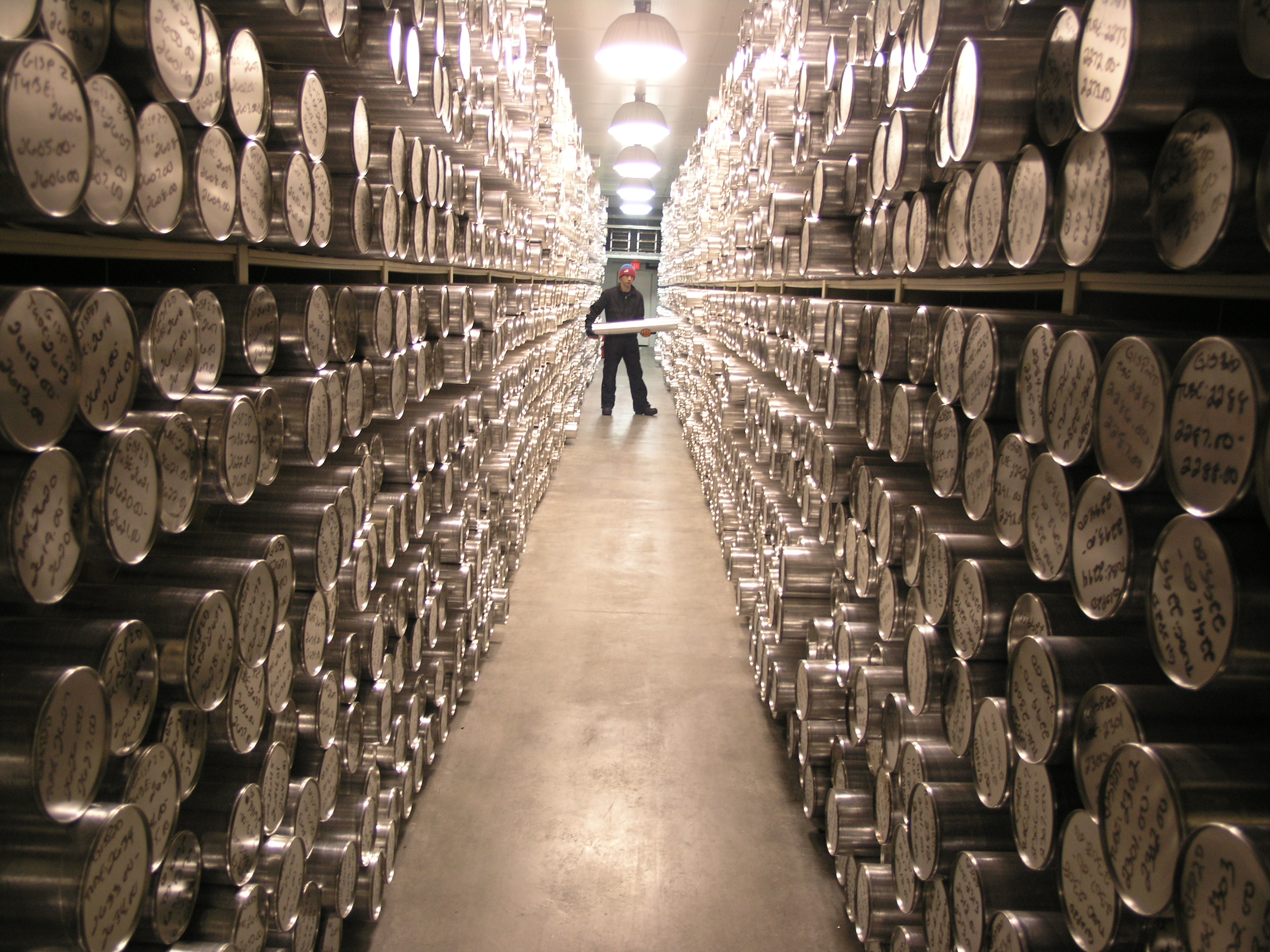
- Ice core storage area at NSF-ICF

Facility overview
- Formed: 1993
- Jurisdiction: United States government
- Headquarters: Denver Federal Center, Lakewood, Colorado, U.S.
- Parent department: National Science Foundation
- Website: https://www.icecores.org

The National Science Foundation Ice Core Facility (NSF-ICF), known as the National Ice Core Laboratory (NICL) before 2018, is the primary repository for ice cores collected by the United States. The facility is located at the Denver Federal Center in Lakewood, Colorado, and is managed by the United States Geological Survey (USGS). Funding for the facility comes from the National Science Foundation Office of Polar Programs, while scientific research is managed by the University of New Hampshire. NSF-ICF currently houses ~22,000 m of ice cores collected from Greenland and Antarctica, including the GISP2, Siple Dome, and portions of the Vostok cores. It is the lead facility for management of the West Antarctic Ice Sheet (WAIS) Divide ice core.

In addition to providing a large storage facility, maintained at −35 °C, NSF-ICF also has one of the largest sub-zero research and sample preparation spaces in the world. NSF-ICF is responsible for distributing samples of ice cores in their collection to researchers around the world, following approved research proposals.

In addition to the primary archive freezer, NSF-ICF has a nonsterile exam room, as well as a FED-STD-209E class-100 HEPA-filtered, cold cleanroom held at −24 °C that scientists use when examining ice cores.

Scientists generally use the exam rooms to cut samples from the ice cores, and then ship the samples back to their home institution for analysis. Very little analysis of the ice cores occurs at NSF-ICF itself.

In addition to research activities, NSF-ICF also participates in public outreach and gives ~100 tours per year.

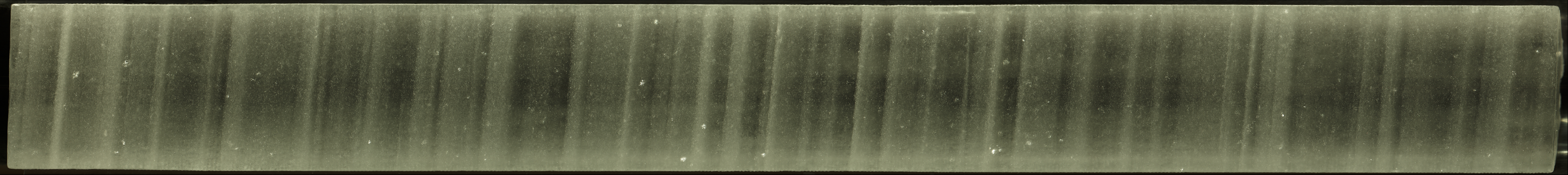
A section of the GISP2 ice core photographed at NICL

== See also ==
- Frozen zoo, a similar concept, but for animals
- Svalbard Global Seed Vault
- Amphibian Ark
- Coral reef organizations
- Rosetta Project
