= Coral Reef Alliance =

Non-profit, environmental NGO focused on protecting coral reefs

- Founded: 1994; Berkeley, California
- Type: Nonprofit organization
- Purpose: Coral reef protection
- Key people: Heather Starck, Executive Director
- Website: coral.org/en

The Coral Reef Alliance (CORAL) is an environmental non-profit, 501(c)(3) non-governmental organization that is dedicated to coral reef conservation. The organization was founded in 1994 by Stephen Colwell.

== Programs ==
CORAL's work includes aquatic research, educating local communities, and building alliances with governments, agencies, research institutions, and other NGOs to protect coral reefs. CORAL also has a coral bleaching response network using high-resolution satellite images to monitor coral reefs and bleaching events. CORAL estimates that 90% of the world's coral reefs could undergo annual coral bleaching, and in a Nature Ecology and Evolution publication, predicts that a significant portion of coral reefs may go extinct without further intervention.

CORAL operates at reef regions in Hawai'i (Hawai‘i Island and Maui), Honduras and Mexico to maintain clean water, healthy fisheries, and protected habitat. In a March 2023 interview with CORAL employee Javier Pizaña-Alonso, it was reported the organisation is planning to expand operations to Roatán, Honduras, and Belize as these are major cruise ship destinations with a large amount of reef tourism.

== Finances ==
In the fiscal year of 2020, tax documents (IRS Form 990) show a total revenue of $4,056,840 and expenditure of $3,430,103. They are funded by individual donors, foundations, as well as corporate and government grants. In 2021, CORAL raised $4 million in total revenue. $1.3 million of this came from individual and corporate contributions, with the remaining $2.7 million coming from foundation and government grants.

== See also ==
- Coral bleaching – Phenomenon where corals expel algae tissue
- Coral reef protection – Modifying human activities to reduce impact on coral reefs
