= William Paul Fife =

US Air Force officer and hyperbaric medicine researcher

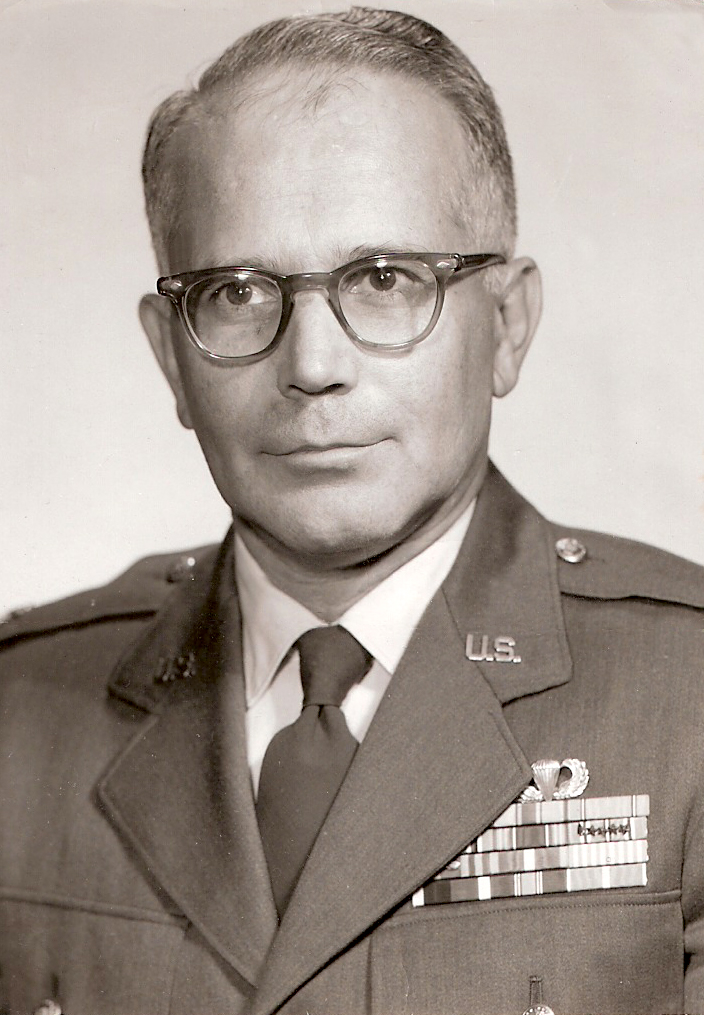
- Born: November 23, 1917; Plymouth, Indiana, U.S.
- Died: October 13, 2008 (aged 90); Bryan, Texas, U.S.
- Burial place: Johnson City, Tennessee
- Military career
- Allegiance: United States of America
- Branch: United States Air Force
- Service years: 1939–1967
- Rank: Colonel
- Nickname: Bill
- Awards: American Defense Service Medal; Asiatic-Pacific Campaign Medal with 1 arrowhead and 3 bronze stars Philippine Liberation Medal; World War II Victory Medal; American Campaign Medal; Army of Occupation Medal - Japan; Korean Service Medal with 1 bronze star Republic of Korea Presidential Unit Citation; National Defense Service Medal; Commendation Ribbon with cluster Air Force Longevity Service Award 1 silver and 1 bronze oak cluster Bronze Star Medal with 3 clusters and 1 bronze arrowhead United Nations Service Medal with 2 clusters Legion of Merit; Parachute wings with star Combat Infantryman Badge
- Other work: Texas A&M University; University of Texas Medical Branch

Colonel William Paul Fife USAF (Ret) (November 23, 1917 – October 13, 2008) was a United States Air Force officer that first proved the feasibility for U.S. Air Force Security Service airborne Communications Intelligence (COMINT) collection and Fife is considered the "Father of Airborne Intercept". Fife was also a hyperbaric medicine specialist who was known for his pioneering research on pressurized environments ranging from high altitude to underwater habitats. Fife was a Professor Emeritus at Texas A&M University.

== Education ==
Fife began his training in anatomy from the University of Washington in 1935 and had started his first year of medical school when World War II began. Fife earned a Bachelor of Science in biology from the University of Oregon in 1956. He later completed a Ph.D. in physiology at Ohio State University in 1962.

Fife was a Certified Hyperbaric Technologist (CHT) through the National Board of Diving and Hyperbaric Medical Technology.

== Military career ==
Fife left medical school and was commissioned Second Lieutenant in U.S. Army in June 1939. Fife then reported to the 15th Infantry at Fort Lewis, Washington for training in Aug 1940. After receiving his basic infantry training, he reported to the 60th Infantry at Fort Bragg in North Carolina where he served as an Assistant Operations Officer in September 1940. Fife volunteered for the 18th class of Parachute Jump School in Fort Benning, Georgia in April 1942. Following his training in May 1942, he joined the newly formed 503rd parachute infantry battalion as Company Commander. As Company Commanding Officer of the 503rd parachute infantry regiment in Sept 1943, Fife led his company in a jump in the Markham Valley, New Guinea. This was the first successful airborne combat jump in the Pacific Theater of Operations. His first combat jump was planned with the ground elevation 500 feet lower than it actually was and Fife found himself in a coconut tree. Fife had completed 35 training and combat jumps by the time WWII ended.

Fife reported to the U.S. Army FE Headquarters Office of Intelligence in January 1944 then to the 68th Airborne Air Control Squadrons (AACS) combat operations in SW Pacific in September. He then went on to the 141st AACS special ops in New Guinea & P.I. in January 1945. Fife reported to the AACS Headquarters Office of Intelligence in Washington, D.C., in August 1945. Hoping for a chance to ride in the planes more often, Fife transferred to the Air Force in November 1947 where he was immediately sent to the Defense Language Institute to learn Russian. He became the first Russian linguist of the USAF Security Service (USAFSS) command. Fife was among the first inductees to the Defense Language Institute Hall of Fame.

Fife was sent to 1st Radio Squadron Mobile, Johnson Air Base, Japan during the Allied Occupation where he earned the unofficial title, "Father of USAFSS Command in the Far East". Part of his duties included intelligence briefings for General Douglas MacArthur. Russian forces were beginning to build up and the Far East Air Force needs were changing, Fife proposed airborne Communications Intelligence (COMINT) collection. In 1950, Fife planned and flew the first USAF Security Service reconnaissance missions from Kadena Air Base over the Sea of Japan with a wire recorder and jury-rigged receiver on an RB-29 air plane. As a result of these missions proved the feasibility for USAFSS airborne COMINT collection and Fife is considered the "Father of Airborne Intercept". He also managed to earn a first degree black belt. In 2006, Fife was inducted into the Air Intelligence Agency Hall of Honor.

Fife was then sent to North Korea where he served as USAFSS 1st RSM's liaison officer to Fifth Air Force Headquarters located in Kim Il Sung's palace and stayed until the then Capt. Fife, ordered the evacuation of USAFSS COMINT personnel as China entered the Korean War. Fife's position was the beginning of the future USAFSS Special Security Office program. In 1951, Fife set up USAFSS linguist team operations in Pyeongtaek with the 606th Aircraft Control and Warning Squadron. Fife had a great respect for the Korean operators he worked with noting they were "the best I have ever seen".

In 1951, Fife returned to Japan until transfer to Moscow shortly after Stalin died. Lieutenant Colonel Fife, with his wife Ann, served as Assistant Air Attaché at the U.S. Embassy with military intelligence as a Russian expert. Following his time in Moscow, he spent time at The Pentagon as the Intelligence Briefing Officer for General Twining and General LeMay. Colonel Fife translated for President Dwight D. Eisenhower a radio transmission from a Soviet fighter pilot intercepted after shooting down a USAF C-130 ACRP (60528) over Armenia in September 1958.

In 1962, after obtaining his Ph.D., he served as Assistant Chief of the Aerospace Medical Research Division at Brooks Air Force Base, San Antonio, Texas, where he performed research essential to the space race. His work was in cardiovascular responses and measurement tools critical for tests of g-force and near-vacuum survival. The Air Force did not have a training program in hyperbaric medicine so Fife was trained by the Navy. His first test dive was performed with Micky Goodwin and Robert Workman.

Col. Fife retired from the Air Force in 1967.

== Academic career ==
Dr. Fife joined the Texas A&M University Department of Biology faculty in 1967. In his time there he served as the Chairman of the Biology Department, Dean of Research and Vice President for Academic Affairs as well as chairman for numerous academic committees.

In the 1980s Dr. Fife acted as the expedition physician on TAMU's Institute of Nautical Archaeology (INA) project in Turkey.

Dr. Fife was instrumental in the founding of the American Academy of Underwater Sciences.

He retired from Texas A&M in 1997.

== Contributions to hyperbaric medicine ==
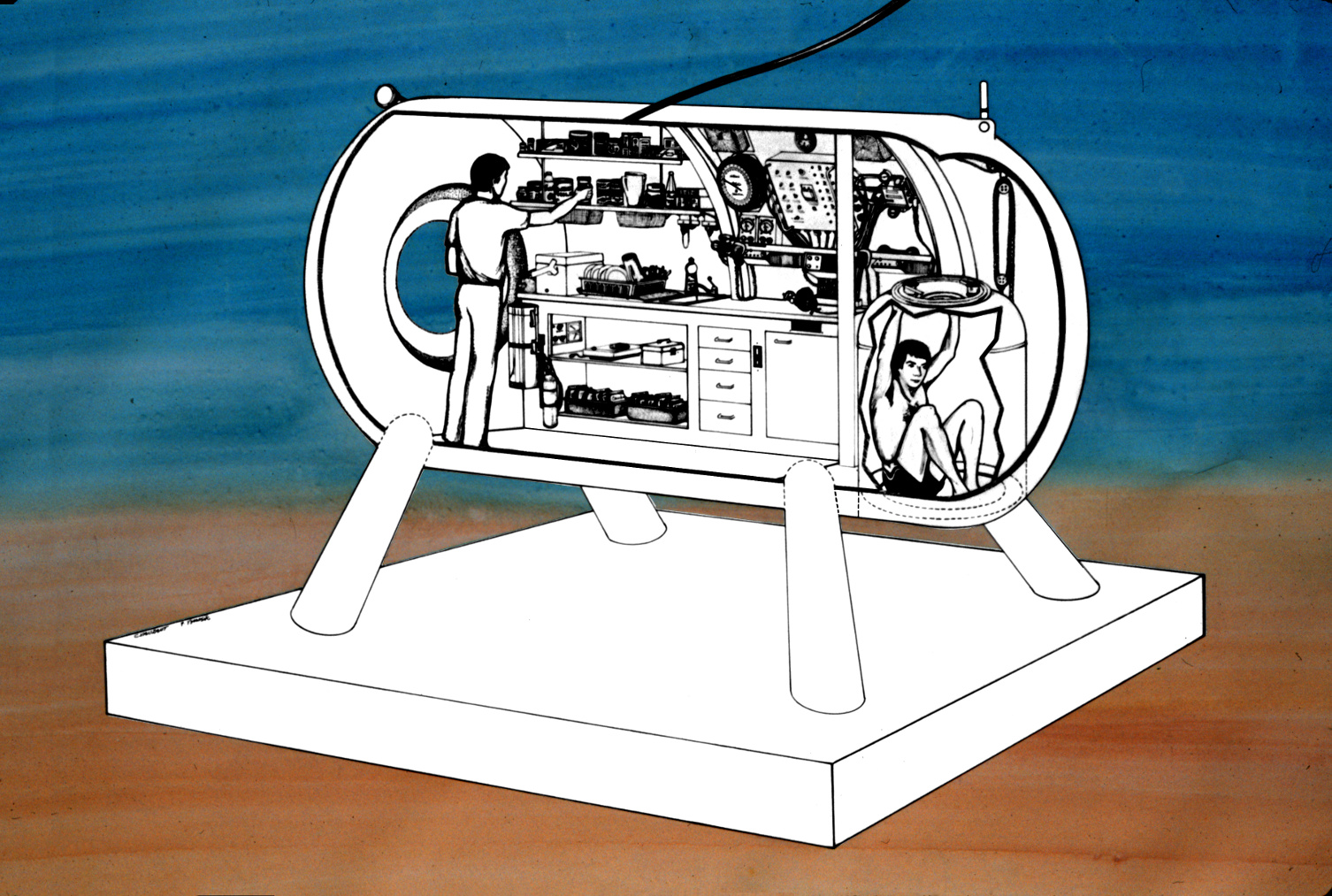
Inside Hydrolab

Fife was a pioneer in undersea medicine and served as director of the Texas A&M University Hyperbaric laboratory.

Fife was active with the HydroLab saturation diving research program funded by the National Oceanic and Atmospheric Administration. Fife was an aquanaut having spent 28 days in saturation in the habitat performing physiology experiments.

The first uses of hydrox, a gas mixture of hydrogen and oxygen is used as a breathing gas in very deep diving are usually attributed to six ocean dive trials by the Swedish engineer, Arne Zetterström in 1945. Fife later showed that hydrox would allow divers to descend and work at great depths. Fife also developed the first decompression tables for the use of the mixture. The French engineering company COMEX (Compagnie maritime d'expertises) later applied Fife's work in developing their HYDRA dive series.

Much of his other diving medical research was focused on women in diving and spinal cord decompression sickness.

Fife's interest in clinical hyperbaric medicine lead to several research projects to look for new indications for the use of hyperbaric oxygen therapy. It has been estimated that about half of the 2,000 patient treatments done by his lab were for research.

These projects included the treatment of:

- squamous cell carcinoma in mice with hydrox;
- migraine headache;
- Post-polio syndrome;
- Chronic Fatigue Syndrome;
- radionecrosis;
- brown recluse spider bites;
- non-union fractures;
- closed head injury;
- Chronic Lyme disease.

HyperTrak clinical documentation software, marketed by Intellicure, Inc., was started at Texas A&M University with Dr. Fife and David Walker in 1996.

== Professional societies ==
Fife was a member of the Aerospace Medical Association, the American Physiological Society, Sigma Xi and the American Academy of Underwater Sciences. He served on the executive committee of the Undersea and Hyperbaric Medical Society.

== Awards ==
Texas A&M University presented Fife with the University Outstanding Award for Teaching in 1975. The Undersea and Hyperbaric Medical Society conveyed their Paul Bert Award for Distinguished Research to Fife in 1983 and their Oceaneering Award for Research in 1994. On his 78th birthday in 1995, Fife and a team from Diving Diseases Research Centre received "The Duke of Edinburgh's Prize of the British Sub-Aqua Club" which was presented by H.R.H. Prince Philip for their work on "Men and Women in Diving".
