= CO2 content =

CO_{2} content (also known as "Total CO_{2}") is a blood test that usually appears on a "Chem 19" or an electrolyte panel. The value measures the total dissolved Carbon dioxide (CO_{2}) in blood. It is determined by combining the bicarbonate (HCO_{3}^{−}) and the partial pressure of CO_{2} multiplied by a factor which estimates the amount of pure CO_{2} that is dissolved in its natural form (usually 0.03).

One given reference range is 24–32 mEq/L.
