= Hydreliox =

Breathing gas mixture of hydrogen, helium, and oxygen

Hydreliox or helihydrox is a breathing gas mixture of hydrogen, helium, and oxygen.

It is used primarily for research and scientific deep diving, usually below 130 metres (430 ft). Below this depth, extended breathing of heliox gas mixtures may cause high pressure nervous syndrome (HPNS). Two gas mixtures exist that attempt to combat this problem: trimix and hydreliox. Like trimix, hydreliox contains helium and oxygen and a third gas to counteract HPNS. The third gas in trimix is nitrogen and the third gas in hydreliox is hydrogen. Because hydrogen is the lightest gas, it is easier to breathe than nitrogen under high pressure. To avoid the risk of explosion, as a rule of thumb hydrogen is only considered for use in breathing mixtures if the proportion of oxygen in the mixture is less than 5%. However, the pressure during the dive must be such that the partial pressure of 5% oxygen is sufficient to sustain the diver. (The flammability of the mixture also depends to some degree on the pressure).

Hydrogen can reduce the effects of high pressure nervous syndrome (HPNS), reduce work of breathing, and may be a partial alternative to helium. Use of hydrogen can make it possible to dive deeper, descend faster, and stay at depth longer. Lower work of breathing allows higher levels of exertion by the diver.

Hydrogen is limited to below 4% in normoxic environments or oxygen content is limited to below 6% in high-hydrogen environments.

== History ==
The diving depth record for off-shore (saturation) diving was achieved in 1988 by a team of professional divers (Th. Arnold, S. Icart, J.G. Marcel Auda, R. Peilho, P. Raude, L. Schneider) of the Comex S.A., industrial deep-sea diving company performing pipe line connection exercises at a depth of 534 m (1,752 ft) of seawater (msw/fsw) in the Mediterranean Sea as part of the Hydra VIII (Hydra 8) programme.

Hydreliox has been tested in 1992 to a simulated depth of 701 metres (2,300 ft) by COMEX S.A. diver Théo Mavrostomos in an on-shore hyperbaric chamber as part of the Hydra X (Hydra 10) programme. The Hydra X team Théo Mavrostomos belonged to spent 3 days at the simulated 675 metres (2,215 ft) depth. After the rest of this team were held incapacitated at 675 m depth, Mavrostomos took a short 2-hour excursion at the simulated 701 metres (2,300 ft) depth, and took 43 days to complete the record experimental dive. Although breathing hydreliox improves the symptoms seen in HPNS, tests have shown that hydrogen narcosis becomes a factor at depths of 500 metres (1,600 ft).

For the Hydra VIII (Hydra 8) mission at 50 atmospheres of ambient pressure, the mixture used was 49% hydrogen, 50.2% helium, and 0.8% oxygen.

In 2023, Richard Harris conducted an experimental dive to 230 metres (750 ft) utilizing hydreliox with a Megalodon rebreather. (Note: Harris utilized dual-rebreathers for redundancy but only used hydrogen with one.) In 2024, Harris reached a depth of 284 metres (932 ft) while his dive partner Craig Challen reached 272 metres (892 ft) using hydreliox.

== See also ==
- Argox – Gas mixture occasionally used by scuba divers for dry-suit inflation
- Heliox – Breathing gas mixed from helium and oxygen
- Hydrox – Breathing gas mixture experimentally used for very deep diving
- Nitrox – Breathing gas, mixture of nitrogen and oxygen
- Trimix – Breathing gas consisting of oxygen, helium and nitrogen
