= Hydrox (breathing gas) =

Breathing gas mixture experimentally used for very deep diving

Hydrox is a gas mixture of hydrogen and oxygen, occasionally used as an experimental breathing gas in very deep diving. It allows divers to descend several hundred metres. Hydrox has been used experimentally in surface supplied, saturation, and scuba diving, both on open circuit and with closed circuit rebreathers.

Precautions are necessary when using hydrox, since mixtures containing more than 4% oxygen in hydrogen are explosive if ignited. Hydrogen is the lightest gas (one quarter the atomic mass of helium or one half the molecular mass of helium) but still has a slight narcotic potential and may cause hydrogen narcosis. Also like nitrogen, it appears to mitigate the symptoms of high-pressure nervous syndrome on deep bounce dives, but reduces the density of the gas, unlike nitrogen.

== History ==
Although the first reported use of hydrogen seems to be Antoine Lavoisier (1743–1794) experimenting on guinea pigs, the actual first uses of this gas in diving are usually attributed to trials by the Swedish engineer Arne Zetterström in 1945.

Zetterström showed that hydrogen was perfectly usable to great depths. In August 1945, following a fault in using the surface equipment, he died during a demonstration dive. The study of hydrogen was not resumed until several years later by the United States Navy and by the Compagnie maritime d'expertises (Comex), initially during their Hydra I and Hydra II experiments, in 1968 and 1969. Comex subsequently developed procedures allowing dives between 500 and 700 m (1,640 and 2,297 ft) in depth, while breathing gas mixtures based on hydrogen, called hydrox (hydrogen-oxygen) or hydreliox (hydrogen-helium-oxygen).

=== Memorial dives ===
In July 2012, after about a year of preparation and planning, members of the Swedish Historical Diving Society and the Royal Institute of Technology Diving Club, performed a series of hydrox dives in Arne Zetterström's memory. These were performed using the same breathing mixture of 96% hydrogen and 4% oxygen as was developed and tested by Zetterström in the 1940s. The dives were made to a depth of 40 metres (131 ft), just deep enough to be able to use the oxygen-lean gas mixture. Project Leader Ola Lindh commented that in order to repeat Zetterström's record, the team would need to dive to 160 metres (525 ft), and even today a dive to that depth requires planning and equipment beyond the capabilities of most divers.

=== Hydreliox rebreather dives ===
An experimental 230 m (750 ft) hydreliox dive in the Pearse Resurgence in New Zealand was made on 14 February 2023 by Richard Harris, using a Megalodon rebreather. This dive is estimated to be the 54th reported experimental hydrogen dive conducted in the last 80 years by military, commercial and technical divers, and the first reported hydrogen dive using a rebreather. Two Megalodon rebreathers connected at the bailout valve were used for the dive, one with trimix diluent (O_{2}, N_{2}, He), the other with hydreliox (O_{2}, H_{2}, He). It was also the first hydrogen diluent dive in a cave.

In 2024, Harris and Craig Challen dived to 284 metres (932 ft) and 272 metres (892 ft) respectively using hydreliox.

== Use ==
Hydrox may be used for combating high-pressure nervous syndrome, commonly occurring during very deep bounce dives, and as a low-density breathing gas to minimise the work of breathing at extreme depths.

The COMEX experimental series culminated in a simulated dive to 701 metres (2,300 ft), by Théo Mavrostomos on 20 November 1990 at Toulon, during the COMEX Hydra X decompression chamber experiments. This dive made him "the deepest diver in the world".

== Biochemical decompression ==
The United States Navy has evaluated the use of intestinal bacteria to speed decompression from hydrox diving.

== See also ==
- Breathing gas – Gas used for human respiration
  - Argox – Gas mixture occasionally used by scuba divers for dry-suit inflation
  - Heliox – Breathing gas mixed from helium and oxygen
  - Hydreliox – Breathing gas mixture of hydrogen, helium, and oxygen
  - Nitrox – Breathing gas, mixture of nitrogen and oxygen
  - Trimix – Breathing gas consisting of oxygen, helium and nitrogen
- Gas blending – Producing special gas mixtures to specification
