= Compagnie maritime d'expertises =

French offshore diving contractor

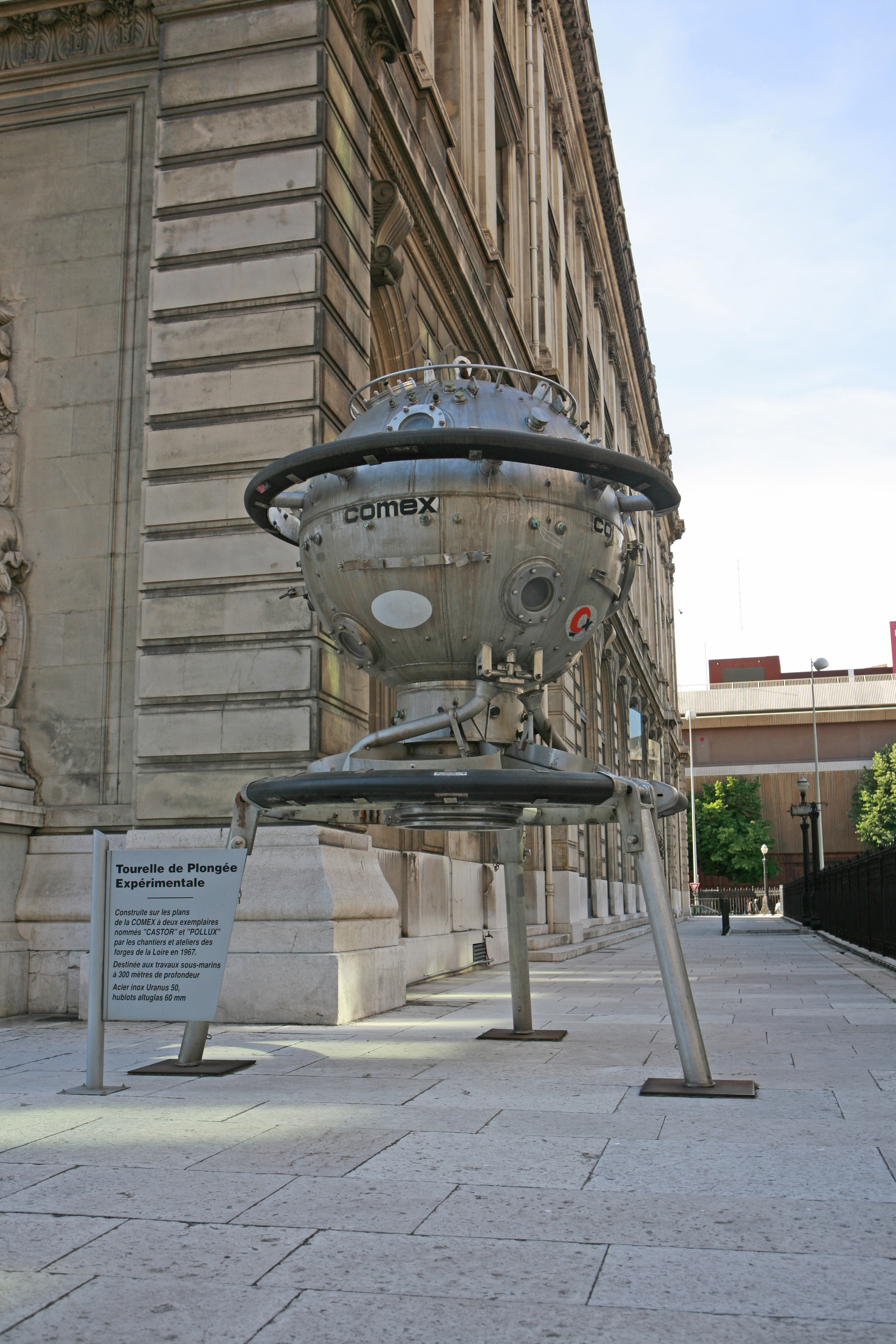
COMEX diving bell

COMEX (or Compagnie Maritime d'Expertises) is a French company specializing in engineering and deep diving operations, created in November 1961 by Henri-Germain Delauze and run by him until his death in 2012. Its line of business includes hyperbaric testing facilities and oceanographic research ships (Minibex and Janus).

COMEX has carried out pioneering work in very deep saturation diving. In 1968, the Hydra I program started work with heliox (a breathing gas mixture of helium and oxygen) and hydreliox (an exotic breathing gas mixture of helium, oxygen and hydrogen) mixtures. The saturation diving physiology studies were conducted with helium from 45 to 610 m (148 to 2,001 ft) and with hydrogen from 70 to 701 m (230 to 2,300 ft). In 1988, as part of the Hydra VIII (Hydra 8) program, the diving depth record for offshore (saturation) diving was achieved by a team of COMEX professional divers (Th. Arnold, S. Icart, J.G. Marcel Auda, R. Peilho, P. Raude, L. Schneider) performing pipeline connection exercises at a depth of 534 m (1,752 ft) of seawater (msw/fsw) in the Mediterranean Sea, whist breathing a hydreliox mixture. The Hydra programme culminated with Hydra X (Hydra 10) in 1992 when COMEX diver Théo Mavrostomos achieved a record simulated dive of 701 metres (2,300 feet) in an onshore hyperbaric chamber.

The use of hydrogen for diving was in part driven by the need to overcome the problems of high-pressure nervous syndrome (HPNS). However, there was another reason for the interest in using hydrogen in a breathing gas. In 1987, Comex was part of a Canadian-French consortium that was building the world’s first commercial nuclear-powered mini-submarine. This submarine, Saga, was a prototype intended to be used for oil exploration and development under the Arctic ice. Saga was built on a hull originally constructed by Jacques-Yves Cousteau but not completed due to lack of funds. Saga would have a complete saturation diving system on board. The nuclear power plant would be able to produce large volumes of hydrogen and oxygen through the electrolysis of water. This would provide plentiful amounts of breathing gas for autonomous diving operations under the Arctic ice cap. The project suffered tax problems in Canada which caused political repercussions between the French and Canadian governments. Saga did undergo successful sea trials in 1991 but without the intended nuclear power plant. Underwater propulsion was provided by a Stirling engine and surface propulsion by a diesel engine. The project was abandoned and Saga was laid up at Marseille.
