= Hydrogen narcosis =

Psychotropic state induced by breathing hydrogen at high partial pressures

Hydrogen narcosis (also known as the hydrogen effect – a rather ambiguous term) is the psychotropic state induced by breathing hydrogen at high partial pressures. Hydrogen narcosis produces symptoms such as hallucinations, disorientation, and confusion, which are similar to hallucinogenic drugs. It can be experienced by underwater divers who dive to 300 m (1,000 ft) below sea level breathing hydrogen mixtures. However, hydrogen has far less narcotic effect than nitrogen (which causes the better known nitrogen narcosis) and is very rarely used in diving. In tests of the effect of hydrogen narcosis, where divers dived to 500 m (1,600 ft) with a hydrogen–helium–oxygen (hydreliox) mixture containing 49% hydrogen, it was found that while the narcotic effect of hydrogen was detectable, the neurological symptoms of high-pressure nervous syndrome were only moderate.

== See also ==
- Nitrogen narcosis – Narcotic effects of respiratory nitrogen
- Oxygen narcosis – Narcotic effect of oxygen at high partial pressure
- Hydrox (breathing gas) – Breathing gas mixture experimentally used for very deep diving
- Hydreliox – Breathing gas mixture of hydrogen, helium, and oxygen
