= Argox =

Gas mixture occasionally used by scuba divers for dry-suit inflation

Argox is the informal name for a scuba diving breathing gas consisting of argon and oxygen. Occasionally the term argonox has been used to mean the same mix. The blend may consist of varying fractions of argon and oxygen, depending on its intended use. The mixture is made with the same gas blending techniques used to make nitrox, except that for argox, the argon is added to the initial pure oxygen partial-fill, instead of air.

Argox is essentially a theoretical diving gas, being rarely, if ever, used, and usually thought to have no practical applications where its benefits outweigh its drawbacks.

== Possible uses ==
=== Human exploration of Mars ===
Argox, or half-argox/half-nitrox is a possible oxygen mixture for human exploration of Mars due to the relative abundance of argon in the Martian atmosphere. The Martian atmosphere is composed of approximately: 95% CO_{2}, 1.9% argon, 1.9% nitrogen. While it is possible for humans to breathe pure oxygen, a pure oxygen atmosphere was implicated in the Apollo 1 fire. As such, Mars habitats may have a need for additional gases. One possibility is to take nitrogen and argon from the atmosphere of Mars; however, they are hard to separate from each other. As a result, a Mars habitat may use 40% argon, 40% nitrogen, and 20% oxygen. Another concept for breathing air is to use re-usable amine bead carbon dioxide scrubbers. While one carbon dioxide scrubber filters the astronauts' air, the other is vented to the Mars atmosphere.

=== Drysuit inflation ===
The helium in the breathing gas trimix, which is used to avoid nitrogen narcosis on deep dives, gives the gas a high thermal conductivity compared with air, making it inappropriate for drysuit inflation. Divers breathing trimix with drysuits usually inflate their drysuits with their decompression gas (usually nitrox or oxygen). A few carry yet another small cylinder, dedicated to drysuit inflation, containing argon.

A second class of divers at intermediate depths of 30–45 metres (100–150 ft) which do not require trimix sometimes carry a pony bottle for emergencies, as is taught in many deep diving courses. Such second bottles are often 3 litres, and may be mounted in various ways from tank bracket to sling mounting. This second bottle can be used for argox, if a drysuit is used.

Some argue that an argox blend with oxygen content similar to that of air could be used as a suit inflation gas in place of pure argon, as such a blend would only have a slightly higher thermal conductivity than pure argon, and unlike pure argon, would be breathable in an emergency. However, there are many problems with the use of suit inflation gas as an emergency breathing gas. Argon is a very narcotic gas, meaning that it could only be breathed at comparatively shallow depths above 20 metres (66 ft). However, in an emergency this is enough for adequate decompression time at typical decompression levels between 3 metres (10 ft) and 9 metres (30 ft), and would save a diver from a direct ascent. The small size of typical very small suit inflation cylinders mean that their contents would quickly be exhausted if breathed, but this is not so of larger ponies.

The thermal conductivity of argon is 68% of that of air or nitrox, hence its use in drysuit inflation. Using argox 20% would slightly degrade this to 74% of that of air.

Argon is far more narcotic (about 2.3 times more) than the cheaper and more readily available nitrogen at depth, so it loses out to nitrogen in all roles as a primary breathing gas. If the maximum operating depth for air owing to narcosis is taken to be 40 metres (130 ft), then for 20% argox (20% O_{2}, 80% Ar) it would be 14.5 metres (48 ft). (Note: Assuming oxygen, nitrogen and air all have roughly equal narcotic potential, and argon is 2.3 times that, the pressure (P) at which the narcotic potential of 20% argox is the same as air at 5 bar (i.e. 40 metres) can be found from P x (0.2 + (0.8 x 2.3)) = 5. That gives P=2.45 bar, which corresponds to 14.5 metres.)

=== Decompression gas ===
It has been theorised on the basis of the theory of isobaric counterdiffusion that argon, because of its higher molecular mass compared with nitrogen (40 vs. 28 u), may cause less inert gas on-loading, if used as a decompression gas, instead of nitrox. The MOD of argox mixes containing more than about 47% oxygen are limited by oxygen MOD (assuming 1.5 atm ppO2) rather than by argon narcosis MOD. The maximal MOD for argox mixes occurs at 47% oxygen and 53% argon, and is about 73 fsw (22 m). This depth is the theoretical maximum which can be safely attained with any two-component argon/oxygen mix: a larger fraction of oxygen than about 50% will result in oxygen toxicity before this depth, and a larger fraction of argon than about 50% will result in argon narcosis before this depth.

However, as argox is more narcotic than nitrogen (causing it to be more dangerous if a decompression mix is accidentally breathed), and because argox is moderately more expensive than nitrox, and mostly because there has been little research done into the actual (vs. theoretical) physiological aspects of breathing argon during decompression, argox is not currently recommended by any professional agency for this purpose.

Although there is little research relating to divers decompressing using argon mixes, there have been scientific studies of astronauts decompressing using argox. The provisional results of those studies indicated higher levels of decompression sickness when argox was used, rather than pure oxygen; however, using pure oxygen is not an option for decompression at the pressures for which argox would be used in diving, and no direct comparison of argon to nitrogen was done. There is also a certain amount of anecdotal evidence within the diving community that informal experimentation with decompression on argon mixtures has resulted in a high incidence of decompression sickness, but no formal studies.

== See also ==
- Heliox – Breathing gas mixed from helium and oxygen
- Hydreliox – Breathing gas mixture of hydrogen, helium, and oxygen
- Hydrox – Breathing gas mixture experimentally used for very deep diving
- Nitrox – Breathing gas, mixture of nitrogen and oxygen
- Trimix – Breathing gas consisting of oxygen, helium and nitrogen
