= Nitrogen narcosis =

Narcotic effects of respiratory nitrogen

Inert gas narcosis [Nitrogen narcosis]
- Divers breathe a mixture of oxygen, helium and nitrogen for deep dives to avoid the effects of narcosis. A cylinder label shows the maximum operating depth and mixture (oxygen/helium).
- Specialty: Medical toxicology

Nitrogen narcosis (also known as narcosis while diving, inert gas narcosis, raptures of the deep, Martini effect) is a reversible alteration in consciousness that occurs while diving at depth. It is caused by the anesthetic effect of certain gases at high partial pressure. The Greek word νάρκωσις (narkōsis), "the act of making numb", is derived from νάρκη (narkē), "numbness, torpor", a term used by Homer and Hippocrates. Narcosis produces a state similar to drunkenness (alcohol intoxication), or nitrous oxide inhalation. It can occur during shallow dives, but does not usually become noticeable at depths less than 30 metres (98 ft).

Except for helium and presumably neon, all gases that can be breathed have a narcotic effect, although widely varying in degree. The effect is consistently greater for gases with a higher lipid solubility, and although the mechanism of this phenomenon is still not fully clear, there is good evidence that the two properties are mechanistically related. As depth increases, the mental impairment may become hazardous. Divers can learn to cope with some of the effects of narcosis, but it is impossible to develop a tolerance. Narcosis can affect all ambient pressure divers, although susceptibility varies widely among individuals and from dive to dive. The main modes of underwater diving that deal with its prevention and management are scuba diving and surface-supplied diving at depths greater than 30 metres (98 ft).

Narcosis may be completely reversed in a few minutes by ascending to a shallower depth, with no long-term effects. Thus narcosis while diving in open water rarely develops into a serious problem as long as the divers are aware of its symptoms, and are able to ascend to manage it. Diving much beyond 40 m (130 ft) is generally considered outside the scope of recreational diving. To dive at greater depths, as narcosis and oxygen toxicity become critical risk factors, gas mixtures such as trimix or heliox are used. These mixtures prevent or reduce narcosis by replacing some or all of the inert fraction of the breathing gas with non-narcotic helium. There is a synergy between carbon dioxide toxicity and inert gas narcosis which is recognised but not fully understood. Conditions where high work of breathing due to gas density occur tend to exacerbate this effect.

== Classification ==
Narcosis results from breathing gases under elevated pressure, and may be classified by the principal gas involved. The noble gases, except helium and probably neon, as well as nitrogen, oxygen and hydrogen cause a decrement in mental function, but their effect on psychomotor function (processes affecting the coordination of sensory or cognitive processes and motor activity) varies widely. The effect of carbon dioxide is a consistent diminution of mental and psychomotor function. The noble gases argon, krypton, and xenon are more narcotic than nitrogen at a given pressure, and xenon has so much anesthetic activity that it is a usable anesthetic at 80% concentration and normal atmospheric pressure. Xenon has historically been too expensive to be used very much in practice, but it has been successfully used for surgical operations, and xenon anesthesia systems are still being proposed and designed.

== Signs and symptoms ==
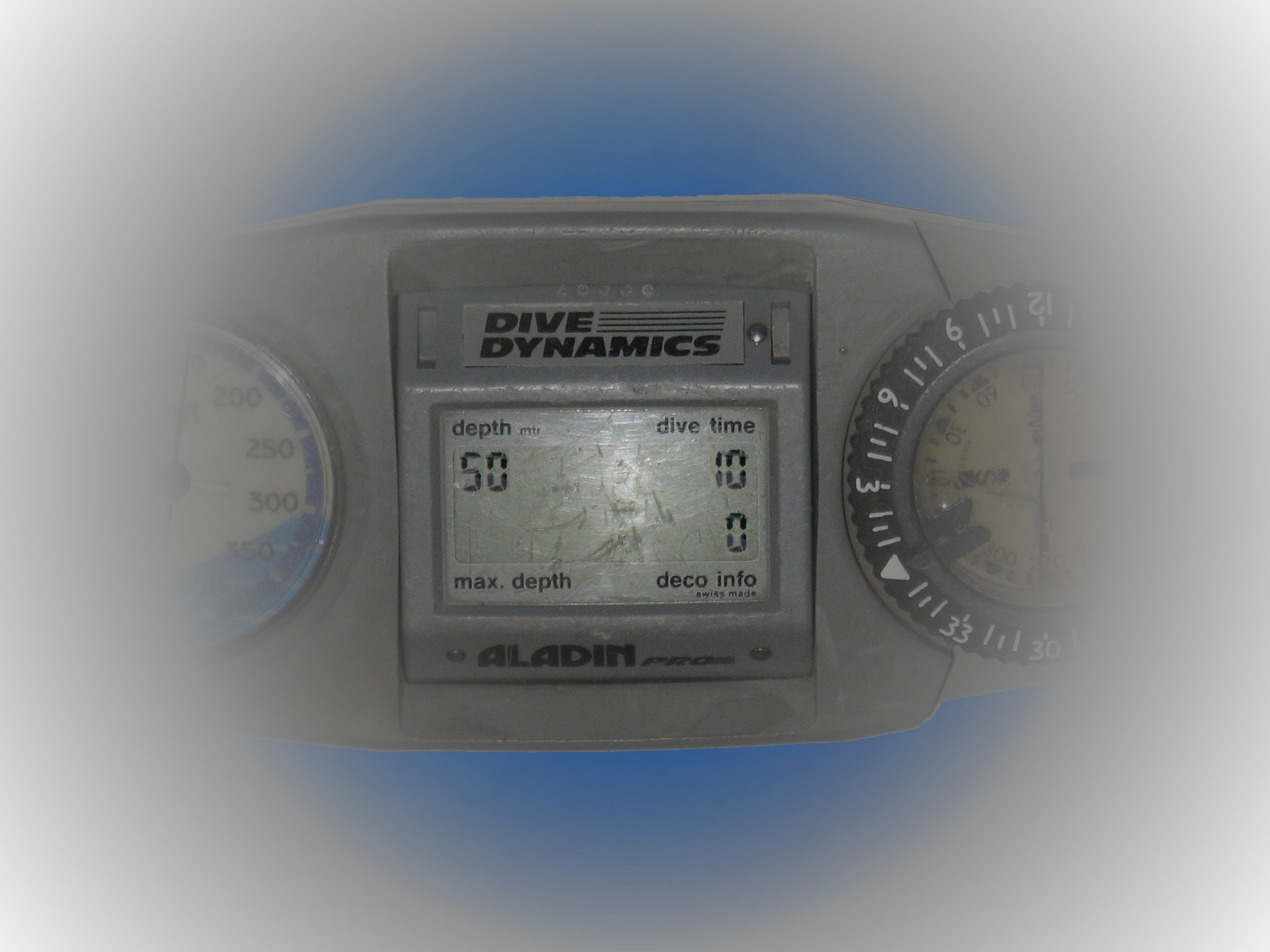
Narcosis can produce tunnel vision, making it difficult to read multiple gauges.

Due to its perception-altering effects, the onset of narcosis may be hard to recognize. At its most benign, narcosis results in relief of anxiety – a feeling of tranquillity and mastery of the environment. These effects are essentially identical to various concentrations of nitrous oxide. They also resemble (though not as closely) the effects of alcohol and the familiar benzodiazepine drugs such as diazepam and alprazolam. Such effects are not harmful unless they cause some immediate danger to go unrecognized and unaddressed. Once stabilized, the effects generally remain the same at a given depth, only worsening if the diver ventures deeper.

The most dangerous aspects of narcosis are the impairment of judgement, multi-tasking and coordination, and the loss of decision-making ability and focus. Other effects include vertigo and visual or auditory disturbances. The syndrome may cause exhilaration, giddiness, extreme anxiety, depression, or paranoia, depending on the individual diver and the diver's medical or personal history. When more serious, the diver may feel overconfident, disregarding normal safe diving practices. Slowed mental activity, as indicated by increased reaction time and increased errors in cognitive function, are effects which increase the risk of a diver mismanaging an incident. Narcosis reduces both the perception of cold discomfort and shivering and thereby affects the production of body heat and consequently allows a faster drop in the core temperature in cold water, with reduced awareness of the developing problem.

The relation of depth to narcosis is sometimes informally known as "Martini's law", the idea that narcosis results in the feeling of one martini for every 10 m (33 ft) below 20 m (66 ft) depth. This is a rough guide to give new divers a comparison with a situation they may be more familiar with.

Reported signs and symptoms are summarized against typical depths in meters and feet of sea water in the following table, closely adapted from Deeper into Diving by Lippman and Mitchell:

Signs and symptoms of narcosis, breathing air
Pressure (bar)	Depth (m)	Depth (ft)	Comments
1–2	0–10	0–33	Unnoticeable minor symptoms, or no symptoms at all
2–4	10–30	33–100	Mild impairment of performance of unpracticed tasks; Mildly impaired reasoning; Mild euphoria possible
4–6	30–50	100–165	Delayed response to visual and auditory stimuli; Reasoning and immediate memory affected more than motor coordination; Calculation errors and wrong choices; Idea fixation; Over-confidence and sense of well-being; Laughter and loquacity (in chambers) which may be overcome by self-control; Anxiety (common in cold murky water)
6–8	50–70	165–230	Sleepiness, impaired judgment, confusion; Hallucinations; Severe delay in response to signals, instructions and other stimuli; Occasional dizziness; Uncontrolled laughter, hysteria (in chamber); Terror in some
8–10	70–90	230–300	Poor concentration and mental confusion; Stupefaction with some decrease in dexterity and judgment; Loss of memory, increased excitability
10+	90+	300+	Intense hallucinations; Increased intensity of vision and hearing; Auditory hallucinations (the wah-wahs); Sense of impending blackout or of levitation; Dizziness, euphoria, manic or depressive states; Disorganization of the sense of time, changes in facial appearance; Unconsciousness, (approximate inspired partial pressure of nitrogen for anaesthesia is 33 atm); Death

== Causes ==
Some components of breathing gases and their relative narcotic potencies (Note: Value for Krypton from 4th Edition, p. 176.)
Gas	Relative narcotic potency
He	0.045
Ne	0.3
H_{2}	0.6
N_{2}	1.0
O_{2}	1.7
Ar	2.3
Kr	7.1
CO_{2}	20.0
Xe	25.6

The cause of narcosis is related to the increased solubility of gases in body tissues, as a result of the elevated pressures at depth (Henry's law). It has been suggested that inert gases dissolving in the lipid bilayer of cell membranes cause narcosis. More recently, researchers have been looking at neurotransmitter receptor protein mechanisms as a possible cause of narcosis. The breathing gas mix entering the diver's lungs will have the same pressure as the surrounding water, known as the ambient pressure. After a change of depth, the partial pressure of inert gases in the blood passing through the brain catches up with ambient pressure within a minute or two, which results in a delayed change in narcotic effect after descending to a new depth. Rapid compression potentiates narcosis owing to carbon dioxide retention.

A divers' cognition may be affected on dives as shallow as 10 m (33 ft), but the changes are not usually noticeable. There is no reliable method to predict the depth at which narcosis becomes noticeable, or the severity of the effect on an individual diver, as it may vary from dive to dive even on the same day.

Significant impairment due to narcosis is an increasing risk below depths of about 30 m (100 ft), corresponding to an ambient pressure of about 4 bar (400 kPa). Most sport scuba training organizations recommend depths of no more than 40 m (130 ft) because of the risk of narcosis. When breathing air at depths of 90 m (300 ft) – an ambient pressure of about 10 bar (1,000 kPa) – narcosis in most divers leads to hallucinations, loss of memory, and unconsciousness. A number of divers have died in attempts to set air depth records below 120 m (400 ft). Because of these incidents, Guinness World Records no longer reports on this figure.

Narcosis has been compared with altitude sickness regarding its variability of onset (though not its symptoms); its effects depend on many factors, with variations between individuals. Thermal cold, stress, heavy work, fatigue, and carbon dioxide retention all increase the risk and severity of narcosis. Carbon dioxide has a high narcotic potential and also causes increased blood flow to the brain, increasing the effects of other gases. Increased risk of narcosis results from increasing the amount of carbon dioxide retained through heavy exercise, shallow or skip breathing, high work of breathing, or because of poor gas exchange in the lungs.

Narcosis is known to be additive to even minimal alcohol intoxication. Other sedative and analgesic drugs, such as opiate narcotics and benzodiazepines, add to narcosis.

== Mechanism ==
Illustration of a lipid bilayer, typical of a cell membrane, showing the hydrophilic heads on the outside and hydrophobic tails inside

The precise mechanism is not well understood, but it appears to be the direct effect of gas dissolving into nerve membranes and causing temporary disruption in nerve transmissions. While the effect was first observed with air, other gases including argon, krypton and hydrogen cause very similar effects at higher than atmospheric pressure. Some of these effects may be due to antagonism at NMDA receptors and potentiation of GABA_{A} receptors, similar to the mechanism of nonpolar anesthetics such diethyl ether or ethylene. However, their reproduction by the very chemically inactive gas argon makes them unlikely to be a strictly chemical bonding to receptors in the usual sense of a chemical bond. An indirect physical effect – such as a change in membrane volume – would therefore be needed to affect the ligand-gated ion channels of nerve cells. Trudell et al. have suggested non-chemical binding due to the attractive van der Waals force between proteins and inert gases.

Similar to the mechanism of ethanol's effect, the increase of gas dissolved in nerve cell membranes may cause altered ion permeability properties of the neural cells' lipid bilayers. The partial pressure of a gas required to cause a measured degree of impairment correlates well with the lipid solubility of the gas: the greater the solubility, the less partial pressure is needed.

An early theory, the Meyer-Overton hypothesis, suggested that narcosis happens when the gas penetrates the lipids of the brain's nerve cells, causing direct mechanical interference with the transmission of signals from one nerve cell to another. More recently, specific types of chemically gated receptors in nerve cells have been identified as being involved with anesthesia and narcosis. However, the basic and most general underlying idea, that nerve transmission is altered in many diffuse areas of the brain as a result of gas molecules dissolved in the nerve cells' fatty membranes, remains largely unchallenged.

== Diagnosis and management ==
The symptoms of narcosis may be caused by other factors during a dive: ear problems causing disorientation or nausea; early signs of oxygen toxicity causing visual disturbances; carbon dioxide toxicity caused by rebreather scrubber malfunction, excessive work of breathing, or inappropriate breathing pattern, or hypothermia causing rapid breathing and shivering. Nevertheless, the presence of any of these symptoms can imply narcosis. Alleviation of the effects upon ascending to a shallower depth will confirm the diagnosis. Given the setting, other likely conditions do not produce reversible effects. In the event of misdiagnosis when another condition is causing the symptoms, the initial management – ascending to a shallower depth – is still beneficial in most cases, as it is also the appropriate response for most of the alternative causes for the symptoms.

The management of inert gas narcosis is usually simply to ascend to shallower depths, where much of the effect disappears within minutes. Divers carrying multiple gas mixtures will usually switch to a mixture with more helium before significant narcosis is noticeable during descent. In the event of complications or other conditions being present, ascending remains the correct initial response unless it would violate decompression obligations. Should problems persist, it may be necessary to abort the dive. The decompression schedule can and should still be followed unless other conditions require emergency assistance.

Inert gas narcosis can follow a gas switch to a decompression gas with higher nitrogen fraction during ascent, which may be confused with symptoms of decompression sickness, in a rare example of a situation in which it is not advisable to ascend immediately. If this is suspected to be the problem, it is better to switch back to the less narcotic gas if practicable, and adjust the decompression schedule to suit. This problem can be aggravated by the possibility of inert gas counterdiffusion, which is most likely to affect the inner ear, and can usually be avoided by a better selection of gas mixtures and switching depths.

== Prevention ==
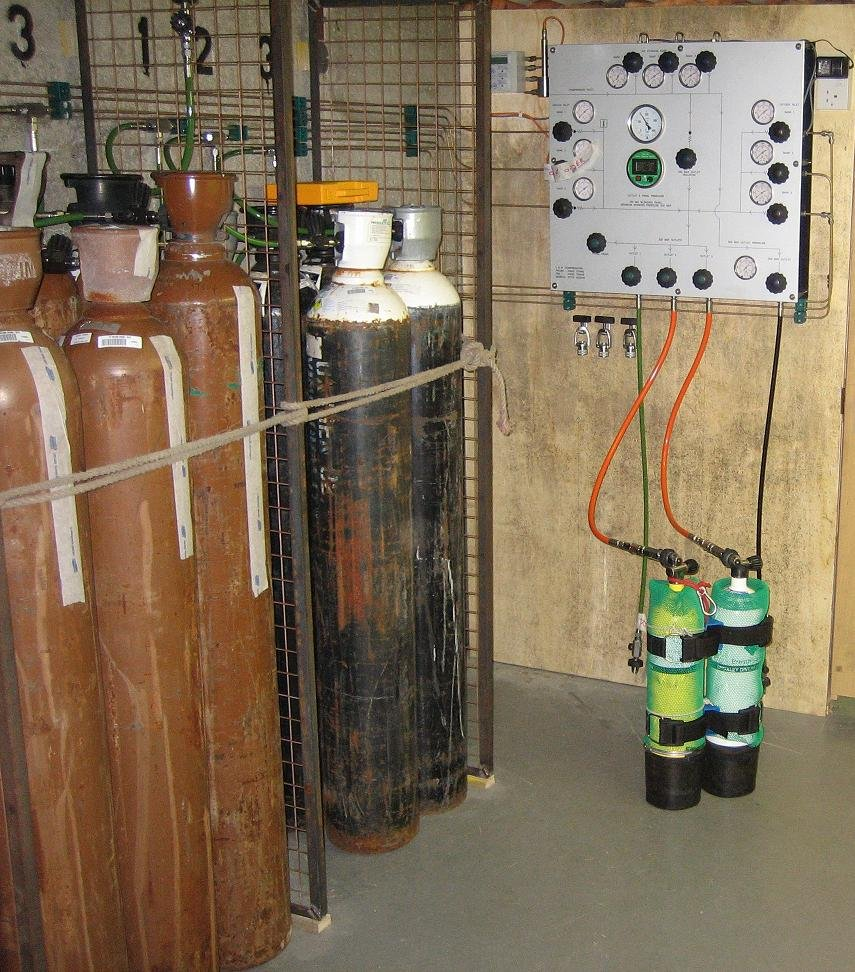
Two diving cylinders being filled with heliox by blending helium from the brown cylinders with oxygen from the black and white cylinders

The most straightforward way to avoid nitrogen narcosis is for a diver to limit the depth of dives. The other main preventive measure is properly informed selection/choice of which gas to use for the particular dive under consideration.

Since narcosis becomes more severe as depth increases, a diver keeping to shallower depths can avoid serious narcosis. Most recreational training agencies will only certify entry level divers to depths of 18 to 20 m (60 to 70 ft), and at these depths narcosis does not present a significant risk. Further training is normally required for certification up to 30 m (100 ft) on air, and this training should include a discussion of narcosis, its effects, and management. Some diver training agencies offer specialized training to prepare recreational divers to go to depths of 40 m (130 ft), often consisting of further theory and some practice in deep dives under close supervision. (Note: A number of technical diving agencies, such as TDI and IANTD teach "extended range" or "deep air" courses which teach diving to depths of up to 55 m (180 ft) without helium.) Scuba organizations that train for diving beyond recreational depths, (Note: BSAC, SAA and other European training agencies teach recreational diving to a depth limit of 50 m (160 ft).) may exclude diving with gases that cause too much narcosis at depth in the average diver (such as the typical widely used nitrox mixtures used for most recreational diving), and strongly encourage the use of other breathing gas mixes containing helium in place of some or all of the nitrogen in air – such as trimix and heliox – because helium has no narcotic effect. The use of these gases is considered to be technical diving and requires further training and certification.

While the individual diver cannot predict exactly at what depth the onset of narcosis will occur on a given day, the first symptoms of narcosis for any given diver are often more predictable and personal. For example, one diver may have trouble with eye focus (close accommodation for middle-aged divers), another may experience feelings of euphoria, and another feelings of claustrophobia. Some divers report that they have hearing changes, and that the sound their exhaled bubbles make becomes different. Specialist training may help divers to identify these personal onset signs, which may then be used as a signal to ascend to avoid the narcosis, although severe narcosis may interfere with the judgement necessary to take preventive action.

Deep dives should be made only after a gradual work-up to test the individual diver's sensitivity to increasing depths, taking note of reactions. Scientific evidence does not show that a diver can develop a resistance to the effects of narcosis at a given depth or become tolerant of it.

Equivalent narcotic depth (END) is a commonly used way of expressing the narcotic effect of different breathing gases. The National Oceanic and Atmospheric Administration (NOAA) Diving Manual now states that oxygen and nitrogen should be considered equally narcotic. Standard tables, based on relative lipid solubilities, list conversion factors for narcotic effect of other gases. For example, hydrogen at a given pressure has a narcotic effect equivalent to nitrogen at 0.55 times that pressure, so in principle it should be usable at more than twice the depth. Argon, however, has 2.33 times the narcotic effect of nitrogen, and is a poor choice as a breathing gas for diving (it is used as a drysuit inflation gas, owing to its low thermal conductivity). Some gases have other dangerous effects when breathed at pressure; for example, high-pressure oxygen can lead to oxygen toxicity. Although helium is the least intoxicating of the breathing gases, at greater depths it can cause high-pressure nervous syndrome, a still mysterious but apparently unrelated phenomenon. Inert gas narcosis is only one factor influencing the choice of gas mixture; the risks of decompression sickness and oxygen toxicity, work of breathing, cost, and other factors are also important.

Because of similar and additive effects, divers should avoid sedating medications and drugs, such as cannabis and alcohol before any dive. A hangover, combined with the reduced physical capacity that goes with it, makes nitrogen narcosis more likely. Experts recommend total abstinence from alcohol for at least 12 hours before diving, and longer for other drugs.

== Prognosis and epidemiology ==
Narcosis is potentially one of the most dangerous conditions to affect the scuba diver below about 30 m (100 ft). Except for occasional amnesia of events at depth, the effects of narcosis are entirely removed on ascent and therefore pose no problem in themselves, even for repeated, chronic or acute exposure. Nevertheless, the severity of narcosis is unpredictable and it can be fatal while diving, as the result of inappropriate behavior in a dangerous environment.

Tests have shown that all divers are affected by nitrogen narcosis, though some experience lesser effects than others. Even though it is possible that some divers can manage better than others because of learning to cope with the subjective impairment, the underlying behavioral effects remain. These effects are particularly dangerous because a diver may feel they are not experiencing narcosis, yet still be affected by it.

== History ==
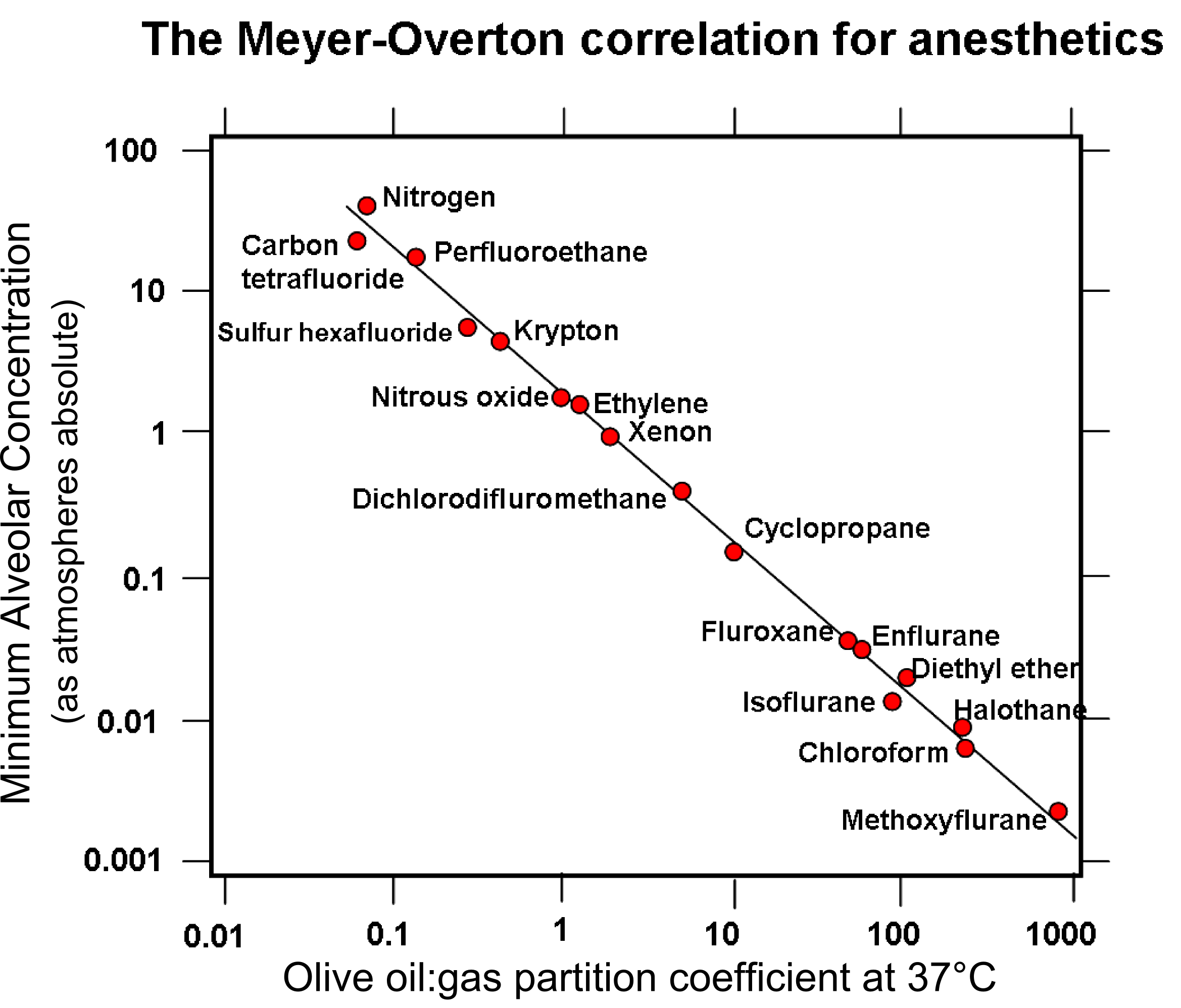
Both Meyer and Overton discovered that the narcotic potency of an anesthetic can generally be predicted from its solubility in oil. Minimum Alveolar Concentration is an inverse indicator of anaesthetic potency.

French researcher Victor T. Junod was the first to describe symptoms of narcosis in 1834, noting "the functions of the brain are activated, imagination is lively, thoughts have a peculiar charm and, in some persons, symptoms of intoxication are present." Junod suggested that narcosis resulted from pressure causing increased blood flow and hence stimulating nerve centers. Walter Moxon (1836–1886), a prominent Victorian physician, hypothesized in 1881 that pressure forced blood to inaccessible parts of the body and the stagnant blood then resulted in emotional changes. The first report of anesthetic potency being related to lipid solubility was published by Hans H. Meyer in 1899, entitled Zur Theorie der Alkoholnarkose. Two years later a similar theory was published independently by Charles Ernest Overton. What became known as the Meyer-Overton hypothesis may be illustrated by a graph comparing narcotic potency with solubility in oil.

In 1939, Albert R. Behnke and O. D. Yarborough demonstrated that gases other than nitrogen also could cause narcosis. For an inert gas the narcotic potency was found to be proportional to its lipid solubility. As hydrogen has only 0.55 the solubility of nitrogen, deep diving experiments using hydrox were conducted by Arne Zetterström between 1943 and 1945. Jacques-Yves Cousteau in 1953 famously described it as "l'ivresse des grandes profondeurs" or the "rapture of the deep".

Further research into the possible mechanisms of narcosis by anesthetic action led to the "minimum alveolar concentration" concept in 1965. This measures the relative concentration of different gases required to prevent motor response in 50% of subjects in response to stimulus, and shows similar results for anesthetic potency as the measurements of lipid solubility. The (NOAA) Diving Manual was revised to recommend treating oxygen as if it were as narcotic as nitrogen, following research by Christian J. Lambertsen et al. in 1977 and 1978, but this hypothesis has been challenged by more recent work.

A study on the effects of the environment on inert gas narcosis published by Lafère et al. in 2016 concluded that pressure and gas composition may be the only significant external factors influencing inert gas narcosis. It also found that the onset of narcosis follows a short period of raised alertness during descent, and some of the effects persist for at least 30 minutes after the dive. As of about 2020, research using critical flicker fusion frequency (CFFF) and EEG functional connectivity has shown sensitivity to nitrogen narcosis, but is not sensitive to helium partial pressure, in laboratory trials.

== See also ==
- Equivalent narcotic depth – Method for comparing the narcotic effects of a mixed diving gas with air
- Hydrogen narcosis – Psychotropic state induced by breathing hydrogen at high partial pressures
- Hypercapnia – Abnormally high tissue carbon dioxide levels
- Oxygen narcosis – Narcotic effect of oxygen at high partial pressure
- Oxygen toxicity – Toxic effects of breathing oxygen at high partial pressures
- Substance-induced psychosis – Mental condition attributed to substance intoxication
