= Heliox =

Breathing gas mixed from helium and oxygen

Identifiers
- CAS Number: 58933-55-4
- PubChem CID: 123812

Chemical and physical data
- Formula: He.O_{2}
- Molar mass: 36.001

Heliox is a breathing gas mixture of helium (He) and oxygen (O_{2}). It is used as a medical treatment for patients with difficulty breathing because this mixture generates less resistance than atmospheric air when passing through the airways of the lungs, and thus requires less effort by a patient to breathe in and out of the lungs. It is also used as a breathing gas for deep ambient pressure diving as it is not narcotic at high pressure, and for its low work of breathing.

Heliox has been used medically since the 1930s, and although the medical community adopted it initially to alleviate symptoms of upper airway obstruction, its range of medical uses has since expanded greatly, mostly because of the low density of the gas. Heliox is also used in saturation diving and sometimes during the deep phase of technical dives.

== Medical uses ==
There is also some use of heliox in conditions of the medium airways (croup, asthma and chronic obstructive pulmonary disease). A recent trial has suggested that lower fractions of helium (below 40%) – thus allowing a higher fraction of oxygen – might also have the same beneficial effect on upper airway obstruction.

Patients with these conditions may develop a range of symptoms including dyspnea (breathlessness), hypoxemia (below-normal oxygen content in the arterial blood) and eventually a weakening of the respiratory muscles due to exhaustion, which can lead to respiratory failure and require intubation and mechanical ventilation. Heliox may reduce all these effects, making it easier for the patient to breathe. Heliox has also found utility in the weaning of patients off mechanical ventilation, and in the nebulization of inhalable drugs, particularly for the elderly. Research has also indicated advantages in using helium–oxygen mixtures in delivery of anaesthesia.

=== Available forms ===
In medicine, heliox may refer to a mixture of 21% O_{2} (the same as air) and 79% He, although other combinations are available (70/30 and 60/40).

== Mechanism of action ==
Heliox generates less airway resistance than air and thereby requires less mechanical energy to ventilate the lungs. "Work of breathing" (WOB) is reduced by two mechanisms:

1. increased tendency to laminar flow;
2. reduced resistance in turbulent flow due to lower density.

Heliox 20/80 diffuses 1.8 times faster than oxygen, and the flow of heliox 20/80 from an oxygen flowmeter is 1.8 times the normal flow for oxygen.

Heliox has a similar viscosity to air but a significantly lower density (0.5 g/L versus 1.25 g/L at STP). Flow of gas through the airway comprises laminar flow, transitional flow and turbulent flow. The tendency for each type of flow is described by the Reynolds number. Heliox's low density produces a lower Reynolds number and hence higher probability of laminar flow for any given airway. Laminar flow tends to generate less resistance than turbulent flow.

In the small airways where flow is laminar, resistance is proportional to gas viscosity and is not related to density and so heliox has little effect. The Hagen–Poiseuille equation describes laminar resistance. In the large airways where flow is turbulent, resistance is proportional to density, so heliox has a significant effect.

=== History ===
Heliox has been used medically since the early 1930s. It was the mainstay of treatment in acute asthma before the advent of bronchodilators. Currently, heliox is mainly used in conditions of large airway narrowing (upper airway obstruction from tumors or foreign bodies and vocal cord dysfunction).

== Usage in diving ==
Effect of helium on a human voice
The effect of helium on a human voice

Helium diluted breathing gases are used to eliminate or reduce the effects of inert gas narcosis, and to reduce work of breathing due to increased gas density at depth. From the 1960s saturation diving physiology studies were conducted with helium from 45 to 610 m (148 to 2,001 ft) over several decades by a Hyperbaric Experimental Centre operated by the French company COMEX specializing in engineering and deep diving operations. Owing to the expense of helium, heliox is most likely to be used in deep saturation diving. It is also sometimes used by technical divers, particularly those using rebreathers, which conserve the breathing gas at depth much better than open circuit scuba. Use of heliox mixtures is known as heliox diving, a subs-category of mixed gas diving, also known simply as gas diving.

Heliox diving cylinder color coding: Illustration of cylinder shoulder painted in brown and white quarters

Illustration of cylinder shoulder painted in brown (lower) and white (upper) bands

The proportion of oxygen in a diving mix depends on the maximum depth of the dive plan, but it is often hypoxic and may be less than 10%. Each mix is custom made using gas blending techniques, which often involve the use of booster pumps to achieve typical diving cylinder pressures of 200 to 300 bar (2,900 to 4,400 psi) from lower pressure banks of oxygen and helium cylinders.

Because sound travels faster in heliox than in air, voice formants are raised, making divers' speech very high-pitched and hard to understand to people not used to it. Surface personnel often employ a piece of communications equipment called a "helium de-scrambler", which electronically lowers the pitch of the diver's voice as it is relayed through the communications gear, making it easier to understand.

Trimix is a less expensive alternative to heliox for deep diving, which uses only enough helium to limit narcosis and gas density to tolerable levels for the planned depth. Trimix is often used in technical diving, and is also sometimes used in professional diving.

In 2015, the United States Navy Experimental Diving Unit showed that decompression from bounce dives using trimix is not more efficient than dives on heliox.

== See also ==
- Argox – Gas mixture occasionally used by scuba divers for dry-suit inflation
- Nitrox – Breathing gas, mixture of nitrogen and oxygen
- Hydreliox – Breathing gas mixture of hydrogen, helium, and oxygen
- Hydrox – Breathing gas mixture experimentally used for very deep diving
- Trimix – Breathing gas consisting of oxygen, helium and nitrogen
