= Arne Zetterström =

Swedish diver and researcher (1917–1945)

- Arne Zetterström in diving dress on board HSwMS Belos, shortly before his fatal diving accident on 7 August 1945
- Born: June 5, 1917; Malmö, Sweden
- Died: August 7, 1945 (aged 28); Äppelviken, Stockholm, Sweden
- Occupations: Engineer, diver
- Known for: Pioneering the use of hydrox for diving

Arne Zetterström (5 June 1917 – 7 August 1945) is best known for his research with the breathing mixture hydrox for the Swedish Navy.

Zetterström first described the use of hydrogen as a breathing gas in 1943. From 1943 to 1944, a total of six ocean dives were made utilizing this mixture with the deepest to 160 metres (96% hydrogen and 4% oxygen).

On 7 August 1945 Zetterström experienced technical problems diving from HSwMS Belos. His support divers misread his signals and this was followed by a rapid ascent that resulted in fatal decompression sickness and hypoxia.
