= High-pressure nervous syndrome =

Disorder from breathing helium based gas at high ambient pressure

High-pressure nervous syndrome (HPNS – also known as high-pressure neurological syndrome) is a neurological and physiological diving disorder which can result when a diver descends below about 500 feet (150 m) using a breathing gas containing helium. The effects experienced, and the severity of those effects, depend on the rate of descent, the depth and the percentage of helium.

"Helium tremors" were described in 1965 by Royal Navy physiologist Peter B. Bennett. Soviet scientist G. L. Zal'tsman first reported on helium tremors in his experiments from 1961. These reports were not available in the West until 1967.

The term high-pressure nervous syndrome was first used by R. W. Brauer in 1968 to describe the combined symptoms of tremor, electroencephalography (EEG) changes, and somnolence that appeared during a 1,189-foot (362 m) chamber dive in Marseille.

== Symptoms ==
Symptoms of HPNS include tremors, myoclonic jerking, somnolence, EEG changes, visual disturbance, nausea, dizziness, and decreased mental performance.

== Causes ==
HPNS has two components, one resulting from the speed of compression and the other from the absolute pressure. The compression effects may occur when descending below 500 feet (150 m) at rates greater than a few metres per minute, but reduce within a few hours once the pressure has stabilised. The effects from depth become significant at depths exceeding 1,000 feet (300 m) and remain regardless of the time spent at that depth. All effects are completely reversible on ascent to shallower depths.

The susceptibility of divers and animals to HPNS varies over a wide range depending on the individual, but has little variation between different dives by the same diver.

The effect of dissolved helium on an embedded trans-membrane channel has also been studied by molecular modeling tools. Those suggest that helium might cause substantial lipid membrane distortion. The high hydrostatic pressure itself has a less damaging influence on the membrane, reducing molecular volumes, but leaving the molecular boundary intact.

== Prevention ==
It is likely that HPNS cannot be entirely prevented but there are effective methods to delay or change the development of the symptoms.

Slow rates of compression, or adding stops to the compression, have been found to prevent large initial decrements in performance. There is circumstantial evidence suggesting that a high chamber temperature can aggravate HPNS, and that the temperature should be maintained at a comfortable level.

Including other gases in the heliox helium–oxygen mixture, such as nitrogen (creating trimix) or hydrogen (producing hydreliox), suppresses the neurological effects.

Alcohol, anesthetics, and anticonvulsant drugs have had varying results in suppressing HPNS in animals. None are currently in use for humans.

== In popular culture ==
HPNS is a plot point in the 1989 James Cameron film The Abyss.

HPNS features in episode one and two of series 3 of State of Happiness (Lykkeland).

In Mission: Impossible – The Final Reckoning, it is mentioned that HPNS will occur during a dive due to the extremely fast descent needed for a mission.

== See also ==
- Barotrauma – Injury due to pressure difference between gas filled space and adjoining tissue
- Compression arthralgia – Joint pain caused by fast compression to high ambient pressure
- Decompression sickness – Disorder caused by dissolved gases forming bubbles in tissues
- Nitrogen narcosis – Narcotic effects of respiratory nitrogen
- Oxygen toxicity – Toxic effects of breathing oxygen at high partial pressures
