= Partial pressure =

Pressure of a component gas in a mixture

The atmospheric pressure is roughly equal to the sum of partial pressures of constituent gases – oxygen, nitrogen, argon, water vapor, carbon dioxide, etc.

In a mixture of gases, each constituent gas has a partial pressure which is the notional pressure of that constituent gas as if it alone occupied the entire volume of the original mixture at the same temperature. The total pressure of an ideal gas mixture is the sum of the partial pressures of the gases in the mixture (Dalton's Law). Partial pressure can be highlighted with a thought experiment using semipermeable pistons, as underlined by Boltzmann, Gibbs and Planck.

In respiratory physiology, the partial pressure of a dissolved gas in liquid (such as oxygen in arterial blood) is also defined as the partial pressure of that gas as it would be undissolved in the gas phase yet in equilibrium with the liquid. This concept is also known as blood gas tension. In this sense, the diffusion of a gas in a liquid is said to be driven by differences in partial pressure (not concentration). In chemistry and thermodynamics, this concept is generalized to non-ideal gases and instead called fugacity. The partial pressure of a real gas is a measure of its thermodynamic activity. Gases dissolve, diffuse, and react according to their partial pressures (which appear in reaction quotient or equilibrium constant of gas reactions) and not according to their concentrations in a gas mixture or as a solute in solution. This general property of gases is also true in chemical reactions of gases in biology.

== Symbol ==
The symbol for pressure is usually p or pp which may use a subscript to identify the pressure, and gas species are also referred to by subscript. When combined, these subscripts are applied recursively.

Examples:

- $P_1$ or $p_1$ = pressure at time 1
- $P_\ce{H2}$ or $p_\ce{H2}$ = partial pressure of hydrogen
- $P_{a_\ce{O2}}$ or $p_{a_\ce{O2}}$ or P_{a}O_{2} = arterial partial pressure of oxygen
- $P_{v_\ce{O2}}$ or $p_{v_\ce{O2}}$ or P_{v}O_{2} = venous partial pressure of oxygen

== Dalton's law of partial pressures ==
Schematic showing the concept of Dalton's Law.

Dalton's law expresses the fact that the total pressure of a mixture of ideal gases is equal to the sum of the partial pressures of the individual gases in the mixture. This equality arises from the fact that in an ideal gas, the molecules are so far apart that they do not interact with each other. Most actual real-world gases come very close to this ideal. For example, given an ideal gas mixture of nitrogen (N_{2}), hydrogen (H_{2}) and ammonia (NH_{3}):

$$p = p_\ce{N2} + p_\ce{H2} + p_\ce{NH3}$$
where:

- $p$ = total pressure of the gas mixture
- $p_\ce{N2}$ = partial pressure of nitrogen (N_{2})
- $p_\ce{H2}$ = partial pressure of hydrogen (H_{2})
- $p_\ce{NH3}$ = partial pressure of ammonia (NH_{3})

== Ideal gas mixtures ==
Ideally the ratio of partial pressures equals the ratio of the number of molecules. That is, the mole fraction $x_{\mathrm{i}}$ of an individual gas component in an ideal gas mixture can be expressed in terms of the component's partial pressure or the moles of the component:
$$x_{\mathrm{i}} = \frac{p_{\mathrm{i}}}{p} = \frac{n_{\mathrm{i}}}{n}$$

and the partial pressure of an individual gas component in an ideal gas can be obtained using this expression:
$$p_{\mathrm{i}} = x_{\mathrm{i}} \cdot p$$

where:
$x_{\mathrm{i}}$	= mole fraction of any individual gas component in a gas mixture
$p_{\mathrm{i}}$	= partial pressure of any individual gas component in a gas mixture
$n_{\mathrm{i}}$	= moles of any individual gas component in a gas mixture
$n$	= total moles of the gas mixture
$p$	= total pressure of the gas mixture

The mole fraction of a gas component in a gas mixture is equal to the volumetric fraction of that component in a gas mixture.

The ratio of partial pressures relies on the following isotherm relation:
$$\frac{V_{\rm i}}{V_{\rm tot}} = \frac{p_{\rm i}}{p_{\rm tot}} = \frac{n_{\rm i}}{n_{\rm tot}}$$

- V_{i} is the partial volume of any individual gas component i
- V_{tot} is the total volume of the gas mixture
- p_{i} is the partial pressure of gas i
- p_{tot} is the total pressure of the gas mixture
- n_{i} is the amount of substance of gas i
- n_{tot} is the total amount of substance in gas mixture

== Partial volume (Amagat's law of additive volume) ==
The partial volume of a particular gas in a mixture is the volume of one component of the gas mixture at total pressure of the mixture. It is useful in gas mixtures, e.g. air, to focus on one particular gas component, e.g. oxygen.

It can be expressed both from partial pressure and molar fraction:
$$V_{\rm i} = V_{\rm tot} \times \frac{p_{\rm i}}{p_{\rm tot}} = V_{\rm tot} \times \frac{n_{\rm i}}{n_{\rm tot}}$$

- V_{i} is the partial volume of an individual gas component i in the mixture
- V_{tot} is the total volume of the gas mixture
- p_{i} is the partial pressure of gas i
- p_{tot} is the total pressure of the gas mixture
- n_{i} is the amount of substance of gas i
- n_{tot} is the total amount of substance in the gas mixture

== Vapor pressure ==
A log-lin vapor pressure chart for various liquids

Vapor pressure is the pressure of a vapor in equilibrium with its non-vapor phases (i.e., liquid or solid). Most often the term is used to describe a liquid's tendency to evaporate. It is a measure of the tendency of molecules and atoms to escape from a liquid or a solid. A liquid's atmospheric pressure boiling point corresponds to the temperature at which its vapor pressure is equal to the surrounding atmospheric pressure and it is often called the normal boiling point.

The higher the vapor pressure of a liquid at a given temperature, the lower the normal boiling point of the liquid.

The vapor pressure chart displayed has graphs of the vapor pressures versus temperatures for a variety of liquids. As can be seen in the chart, the liquids with the highest vapor pressures have the lowest normal boiling points.

For example, at any given temperature, methyl chloride has the highest vapor pressure of any of the liquids in the chart. It also has the lowest normal boiling point (−24.2 °C), which is where the vapor pressure curve of methyl chloride (the blue line) intersects the horizontal pressure line of one atmosphere (atm) of absolute vapor pressure. At higher altitudes, the atmospheric pressure is less than that at sea level, so boiling points of liquids are reduced. At the top of Mount Everest, the atmospheric pressure is approximately 0.333 atm, so by using the graph, the boiling point of diethyl ether would be approximately 7.5 °C versus 34.6 °C at sea level (1 atm).

== Equilibrium constants of reactions involving gas mixtures ==
It is possible to work out the equilibrium constant for a chemical reaction involving a mixture of gases given the partial pressure of each gas and the overall reaction formula. For a reversible reaction involving gas reactants and gas products, such as:
$$\ce{{\mathit{a}A} + {\mathit{b}B} <=> {\mathit{c}C} + {\mathit{d}D}}$$

the equilibrium constant of the reaction would be:
$$K_\mathrm{p} = \frac{p_C^c\, p_D^d} {p_A^a\, p_B^b}$$

where:
$K_p$	= the equilibrium constant of the reaction
$a$	= coefficient of reactant $A$
$b$	= coefficient of reactant $B$
$c$	= coefficient of product $C$
$d$	= coefficient of product $D$
$p_C^c$	= the partial pressure of $C$ raised to the power of $c$
$p_D^d$	= the partial pressure of $D$ raised to the power of $d$
$p_A^a$	= the partial pressure of $A$ raised to the power of $a$
$p_B^b$	= the partial pressure of $B$ raised to the power of $b$

For reversible reactions, changes in the total pressure, temperature or reactant concentrations will shift the equilibrium so as to favor either the right or left side of the reaction in accordance with Le Chatelier's Principle. However, the reaction kinetics may either oppose or enhance the equilibrium shift. In some cases, the reaction kinetics may be the overriding factor to consider.

== Henry's law and the solubility of gases ==
Gases will dissolve in liquids to an extent that is determined by the equilibrium between the undissolved gas and the gas that has dissolved in the liquid (called the solvent). The equilibrium constant for that equilibrium is:

$$k = \frac {p_x}{C_x}$$	1

where:

- $k$ = the equilibrium constant for the solvation process
- $p_x$ = partial pressure of gas $x$ in equilibrium with a solution containing some of the gas
- $C_x$ = the concentration of gas $x$ in the liquid solution

The form of the equilibrium constant shows that the concentration of a solute gas in a solution is directly proportional to the partial pressure of that gas above the solution. This statement is known as Henry's law and the equilibrium constant $k$ is quite often referred to as the Henry's law constant.

Henry's law is sometimes written as:

$$k' = \frac {C_x}{p_x}$$	2

where $k'$ is also referred to as the Henry's law constant. As can be seen by comparing equations (1) and (2) above, $k'$ is the reciprocal of $k$. Since both may be referred to as the Henry's law constant, readers of the technical literature must be quite careful to note which version of the Henry's law equation is being used.

Henry's law is an approximation that only applies for dilute, ideal solutions and for solutions where the liquid solvent does not react chemically with the gas being dissolved.

== In diving breathing gases ==
In underwater diving the physiological effects of individual component gases of breathing gases are a function of partial pressure.

Using diving terms, partial pressure is calculated as:

partial pressure = (total absolute pressure) × (volume fraction of gas component)

For the component gas "i":

p_{i} = P × F_{i}

For example, at 50 metres (164 ft) underwater, the total absolute pressure is 6 bar (600 kPa) (i.e., 1 bar of atmospheric pressure + 5 bar of water pressure) and the partial pressures of the main components of air, oxygen 21% by volume and nitrogen approximately 79% by volume are:

pN_{2} = 6 bar × 0.79 = 4.7 bar absolute
pO_{2} = 6 bar × 0.21 = 1.3 bar absolute

where:
p_{i}	= partial pressure of gas component i = $P_{\mathrm{i}}$ in the terms used in this article
P	= total pressure = $P$ in the terms used in this article
F_{i}	= volume fraction of gas component i = mole fraction, $x_{\mathrm{i}}$, in the terms used in this article
pN_{2}	= partial pressure of nitrogen = $P_\mathrm{N_2}$ in the terms used in this article
pO_{2}	= partial pressure of oxygen = $P_\mathrm{O_2}$ in the terms used in this article

The minimum safe lower limit for the partial pressures of oxygen in a breathing gas mixture for diving is 0.16 bars (16 kPa) absolute. Hypoxia and sudden unconsciousness can become a problem with an oxygen partial pressure of less than 0.16 bar absolute. Oxygen toxicity, involving convulsions, becomes a problem when oxygen partial pressure is too high. The NOAA Diving Manual recommends a maximum single exposure of 45 minutes at 1.6 bar absolute, of 120 minutes at 1.5 bar absolute, of 150 minutes at 1.4 bar absolute, of 180 minutes at 1.3 bar absolute and of 210 minutes at 1.2 bar absolute. Oxygen toxicity becomes a risk when these oxygen partial pressures and exposures are exceeded. The partial pressure of oxygen also determines the maximum operating depth of a gas mixture.

Narcosis is a problem when breathing gases at high pressure. Typically, the maximum total partial pressure of narcotic gases used when planning for technical diving may be around 4.5 bar absolute, based on an equivalent narcotic depth of 35 metres (115 ft).

The effect of a toxic contaminant such as carbon monoxide in breathing gas is also related to the partial pressure when breathed. A mixture which may be relatively safe at the surface could be dangerously toxic at the maximum depth of a dive, or a tolerable level of carbon dioxide in the breathing loop of a diving rebreather may become intolerable within seconds during descent when the partial pressure rapidly increases, and could lead to panic or incapacitation of the diver.

== In medicine ==
The partial pressures of particularly oxygen ($p_\mathrm{O_2}$) and carbon dioxide ($p_\mathrm{CO_2}$) are important parameters in tests of arterial blood gases, but can also be measured in, for example, cerebrospinal fluid.

Reference ranges for $p_\mathrm{O_2}$ and $p_\mathrm{CO_2}$
	Unit	Arterial blood gas	Venous blood gas	Cerebrospinal fluid	Alveolar pulmonary gas pressures
$p_\mathrm{O_2}$	kPa	11–13	4.0–5.3	5.3–5.9	14.2
$p_\mathrm{O_2}$	mmHg	75–100	30–40	40–44	107
$p_\mathrm{CO_2}$	kPa	4.7–6.0	5.5–6.8	5.9–6.7	4.8
$p_\mathrm{CO_2}$	mmHg	35–45	41–51	44–50	36

== See also ==
- Blood gas tension – Partial pressure of blood gases
- Breathing gas – Gas used for human respiration
- Henry's law – Gas law regarding proportionality of dissolved gas
- Ideal gas – Mathematical model which approximates the behavior of real gases
  - Ideal gas law – Equation of the state of a hypothetical ideal gas
- Mole fraction – Proportion of a constituent in a mixture
  - Mole (unit) – SI unit of amount of substance
- Vapor – Substances in the gas phase at a temperature lower than its critical point
