= List of diver certification organizations =

Agencies which issue certification for competence in diving skills

This article lists notable underwater diver certification agencies. These include certification in cave diving, commercial diving, recreational diving, technical diving and freediving. Diver certification agencies are organisations which issue certification of competence in diving skills under their own name, and which train, assess, certify and register the instructors licensed to present courses following the standards for the certification they issue. They are expected to provide quality assurance for the training done to their standards by licensed schools and instructors.

== Recreational scuba diving certification agencies ==
Organisations which publish standards for competence in recreational scuba diving skills and knowledge, and issue certification for divers assessed as competent against these standards by affiliated schools or instructors:

- FlowState Divers - FlowState Divers
- ACDC - Associazione CMAS Diving Centre Italia CMAS code ITA/F07
- ACUC - American Canadian Underwater Certifications – Recreational diver training and certification agency
- AED - Associated European Divers CMAS code INT/F09
- AFUS - Armenian Federation of Underwater Sports CMAS code ARM/F00
- Albatros Progetto Paolo Pinto CMAS code ITA/F14
- AMCQ - Association des Moniteurs de la CMAS du Quebec CMAS code CAN/F05
- ANDI - American Nitrox Divers International – Recreational diver training and certification agency, also ANDI International EUF CB 2005005
- ANIS - Associaziona Nazionale Istruttori Subacquei CMAS code ITA/F08
- ANMP - Association nationale des moniteurs de plongée – French recreational diver training and certification agency
- APT - Antincendio Prevencione Tecnologia CMAS code ITA/F05
- ASD Acqua Team CMAS code ITA/F04
- ASI - Alleanza Sportiva Italiana Divisione Subacquea CMAS code ITA/F11
- AUF - Australian Underwater Federation – Governing body for underwater sports CMAS code AUS/F00
- AUSI - Associated Underwater Scuba Instructors (formerly Australian Underwater Scuba Instructors)
- BEFOS-FEBRAS - Fédération Royale Belge De Recherches et d'Activites Sous-Marines (Royal Belgian Diving Federation) CMAS code BEL/F00
- Belarus Federation of Underwater Sport CMAS code BLR/F00
- BNAUA - Bulgarian National Association of Underwater Activity CMAS code BUL/F01
- BSAC - British Sub Aqua Club – Recreational diving club, training and certification agency based in the UK EUF CB 2007001
- CBPDS - Confederaçao Brasiliera de Pesca e Desportos Subaquáticos CMAS code BRA/F00
- CDP - Canadian Diving Program CMAS code CAN/F08
- CFT - Comhairle Fo-Thuinn – Governing body for recreational diving and underwater hockey in Ireland (Irish Underwater Council) CMAS code IRL/F00
- CFUA - Cyprus Federation of Underwater Activities CMAS code CYP/F00
- CIRSS - Comitato Italiano Ricerche Studi Subaquei CMAS code ITA/F01
- CMAS - Confédération Mondiale des Activités Subaquatiques – International organisation for underwater activities
- CMAS Baltic - CMAS Baltic Sporta Biedrtba (Latvia) CMAS code LAT/F01
- CMAS-CH - CMAS Switzerland CMAS code SUI/F01
- CMAS-ISA - CMAS Instructors of South Africa – Member federation of CMAS for South Africa CMAS code RSA/F01
- CRASA - Confederation Russe des Activites Subaquatiques CMAS code RUS/F00
- CTUF - Chinese Taipei Underwater Federation CMAS code TPE/F01
- CUA - Chinese Underwater Association CMAS code CHN/F00
- DDI - Disabled Divers International EUF CB 2011003
- DSF - Dansk Sports Dykker Forbund Danish Sports Divers Federation CMAS code DEN/F00, EUF CB 2005006
- EAVSL - Eesti Allveeliit (Estonian Sportdivers Association) CMAS code EST/F00
- ESA - ESA Worldwide CMAS code ITA/F12
- EOBV - Erste Österreichische Berufstauchlehrer Verband
- EDLF - Egyptian Diving & Lifesaving Federation CMAS code EGY/F00
- FAAS - Federación Argentina de Actividades Subacuaticas (Argentine Underwater Federation) CMAS code ARG/F00
- FADAS - Federacio Andorrana d'Activitats Subaquaticas CMAS code AND/F00
- FASSAS - Fédération Algerienne de Sauvetage de Secourisme et des Activites Subaquatiques. CMAS code ALG/F00
- FAS - Federatia de Activitati Subacvatice din Republica Moldava (Federation of Underwater Activities of the Republic of Moldava) CMAS code MDA/F02
- FAST - Federation des Activites Subaquatiques de Tunisie CMAS code TUN/F00
- FAUI - Formation of Australian Underwater Instructors (formerly National Association of Scuba Diving Schools Australasia)
- FCAS - Federacion Cubana de Actividades Subacuaticas CMAS code CUB/F00
- FCVDS - Federacao Cabo Verde Desportivo Subm. José Maria Aquatico CMAS code CPV/F00
- FEDAS - Federación Española de Actividades Subacuáticas – Spanish national federation for underwater activities, affiliated to CMAS (Spain) CMAS code ESP/F00
- FEDASUB - Federación Ecuatoriana de Buceo y Actividades Subacuaticas CMAS code ECU/F00
- FEDECAS - Federacion Colombiana de Actividades Subacuaticas CMAS code COL/F00
- FEDEPASA - Federacion Peruana de Actividades Subacuaticas CMAS code PER/F00
- FEDESUB - Federation Deportiva Nacional de Deportes Submarinos (Chile) CMAS code CHI/F00
- FFESSM - Fédération Française d'Études et de Sports Sous-Marins – French diver training and certification agency (French Underwater Federation) CMAS code FRA/F00
- Federazione Italiana Sport Acquatici CMAS code ITA/F10
- FIAS - Federazione Italiana Attività Subacquee – Italian non-profit recreational diver training organisation affiliated to CMAS CMAS code ITA/F09, EUF CB 2005004
- Finnish Underwater Certification Kluster
- FIPSAS - Federazione Italiana Pesca Sportiva e Attività Subacquee CMAS code ITA/F00
- FLASSA - Fédération Luxembourgeoise des Activites et Sports Subaquatiques ASBL CMAS code LUX/F00
- FMAS - Federation Monegasque des Activites Subaquatiques (Monaco) CMAS code MON/F00
- FMAS - Federacion Mexicana de Actividades Subacuaticas A.C. CMAS code MEX/F00
- FMPAS - Federation Marocaine de Plongée et Activites Subaquatiques (Moroccan Federation of Diving and Underwater Activities) CMAS code MAR/F00
- FPAS - Federacao Portuguesa Actividades Subaquaticas (Portuguese Federation of Underwater Activities) CMAS code POR/F00
- FSAS - Federazione Sammarinese Attivita Subacquee CMAS code SMR/F00
- FSGT -Fédération Sportive et Gymnique du Travail
- FUAM - Federation of Underwater Activities Malta CMAS code MLT/F00
- FVAS - Federacion Venezolana de Actividades Subacuaticas CMAS code VEN/F00
- GUE - Global Underwater Explorers – Recreational/technical scuba training and certification agency EUF CB 2013001
- HSA - Handicapped Scuba Association
- HFUA - Elliniki Ohospondia Ypoyrichias Drastriottas Athlitikis Alkias kai Technikis Kolymvisis (Hellenic Federation for Underwater Activities, Sportfishing and Finswimming) CMAS code GRE/F00
- HKUAL - Hong Kong Underwater Association CMAS code HKG/F00
- HRS - Hrvatski Ronilacki savez (Croatian Diving Federation) CMAS code CRO/F00
- IAC - International Aquanautic Club EUF CB 2005001
- IAHD - International Association for Handicapped Divers – Non-profit organisation based in the Netherlands EUF CB 2007005
- IAHD Adriatic - Mednarodno zdruzenje hendikepiranih potapljacev Adriatic (International Association for Handicapped Divers Adriatic) CMAS code SLO/F01
- IANTD - International Association of Nitrox and Technical Divers – Recreational and technical scuba training and certification agency CMAS code INT/F01
- IDA International Diving Association
- IDDA - International Discovery Diving Association
- IDEA - International Diving Educators Association – Recreational scuba training and certification agency
- IPA - International Police Association – Non-Governmental Organisation of police and ex-police (Monaco) CMAS code INT/F11
- IDSA International Diving Schools Association – Organisation to develop common standards for commercial diver training
- ISDA - International Scuba Diving Academy EUF CB 2010002
- ISC - International Scuba Certification
- ISE - InnerSpace Explorers
- Irish Underwater Council – Governing body for recreational diving and underwater hockey in Ireland EUF CB 2006003
- Islamic Republic of Iran Lifesaving Federation CMAS code IRI/F00
- ISEA - International Scuba Education Association
- ITDA - International Technical Diving Agency
- JCIA - Japan CMAS Instructor Association CMAS code JPN/F00
- JCS - JCS CMAS code JPN/F03
- JEFF - Japan Educational Facilities Federation CMAS code JPN/F02
- KD Japan - Kansai Sensui Renmei (Kansai Sports Diving Federation Japan) CMAS code JPN/F05
- KDP PTTK - Polskie Towarzystwo Turystyczno-Krajoznawcze Komisja Dzialalnosci Podw (Polish Tourist Country-Lovers Society Underwater Activity Commission) CMAS code POL/F00
- KP-LOK - Komisja Pletwonurkowania LOK (Commission Diving National Defense League) CMAS code POL/F02
- KSC - Kuwait Science Club CMAS code KUW/F02
- KUA - Korea Underwater Association CMAS code KOR/F00
- KUF - Kyrgyz Underwater Federation CMAS code KGZ/F00
- KWTDIVERS - Kuwait Academy for Diving and Swimming CMAS code KUW/F01
- LDA - Libyan Diving Association (Ajamiaa Alibia Lil Gaus) CMAS code LBA/F00
- LIB - Lebanese Diving and Salvage Federation CMAS code LIB/F00
- LTV - Liechtensteiner Tauchsport Verband (CMAS Liechtenstein) CMAS code LIE/F00
- LUSF - Lietuvos Povandeninio Sporto Federacija (Lithuanian Underwater Sport Federation) CMAS code LTU/F00
- LZSF - Latviejas Zemudens Sporta Federacija (Federation of Underwater Sports of Latvia) CMAS code LAT/F02
- MBSz - Magyar Búvár Szakszövetség (Hungarian Divers Federation) CMAS code HUN/F00
- MICRODIVE - Microdive
- MDEA - Multinational Diving Educators Association
- MSDA - Mauritian Scuba Diving Association CMAS code MRI/F00
- MSAC - Malayan Sub Aqua Club CMAS code MAS/F00
- MTES - Marine Techno Educational System diving division. CMAS code JPN/F04
- MUF - Maldives Underwater Federation CMAS code MDV/F01
- NADD - NADD Global Diving Agency CMAS code ITA/F03 EUF S 000513
- NASE - National Academy of Scuba Educators – Recreational scuba training and certification agency EUF CB 2008003
- NASDS - National Association of Scuba Diving Schools
- NAUI - National Association of Underwater Instructors – Non-profit training and certification agency association of scuba instructors
- NDF - Norges Dykkeforbund (Norwegian Diving Federation) CMAS code NOR/F00
- NDL - National Dive League EUF CB 2007003
- NOB - Nederlandse Onderwatersport Bond – Dutch governing body for underwater sports (Dutch Underwater Federation) CMAS code NED/F00
- NUWF - Namibia Underwater Federation CMAS code NAM/F00
- PADI - Professional Association of Diving Instructors – Recreational diver training and certification agency EUF CB 2004001
- PCIA - Philippine Federation of CMAS Underwater Activities (CMAS Philippines) CMAS code PHI/F01
- PDA - Professional Diving Association EUF CB 2006004
- PDIC - Professional Diving Instructors Corporation International – Recreational diver training and certification agency
- PDSA - Professional Diving Schools Association of Malta
- POSSIISSA - Persartuan Olahraga Selam Seluruh Indonesia (Indonesian Subaquatic Sport Association) CMAS code INA/F00
- ProTec - Professional Technical and Recreational Diving – Diver certification agency CMAS code INT/F08
- PSAI - Professional Scuba Association International
- PSS - Professional Scuba Schools
- PTA - Pure Tech Agency CMAS code INT/F07
- PTRD - Professional, Technical & Rebreather Diving EUF S 000786
- PURE APNEA
- PZPn - Polski Zwiazek Pletwonurkowania (Polish Underwater Sports Federation) CMAS code POL/F01
- Ronilacki Savez Crne Gore (Diving Association of Montenegro) CMAS code MNE/F00
- RAID - Rebreather Association of International Divers – Recreational diver training and certification agency
- RJMSF - Royal Jordanian Marine Sports Federation CMAS code JOR/F00
- RUF - Russian Underwater Federation CMAS code RUS/F01
- Saudi Arabia Maritime Sports Federation CMAS code KSA/F00
- Savez Ronilaca Bosne I Hergegovine (Diving association of Bosnia and Herzegovina) CMAS code BIH/F00
- SAA - The Sub-Aqua Association – British recreational diver training and certification organisation CMAS code GBR/F03
- SEI - Scuba Educators International – Recreational diver training and certification agency USOA CMAS code USA/F00
- SDFS - Scuba Diver Federation of Seychelles CMAS code SEY/F00
- SDI - Scuba Diving International – Recreational diver training and certification agency EUF CB 2006002
- Serbian Underwater Federation CMAS code SRB/F00
- SNSI - Scuba and Nitrox Safety International
- SPCR - Svaz Potapecu Ceske Republikiy (Divers Association of the Czech Republic) CMAS code CZE/F00
- SPZ - Slovenska Potapljaska Zveza (Slovenian Diving Federation) CMAS code SLO/F00
- SSAC -Scottish Sub Aqua Club
- SSDF - Svenska Sportdykarförbundet (Swedish Sports Diving Federation) CMAS code SWE/F00
- SSI - Scuba Schools International – Recreational scuba and freediving training and certification agency EUF CB 2005002
- SUF - Singapore Underwater Federation CMAS code SIN/F00
- Sukeltajaliitto Ry (Finnish Divers Federation) CMAS code FIN/F00
- SUSV - Schweizer Unterwassersport-Verband CMAS code SUI/F00
- Syrian Underwater Sport Federation CMAS code SYR/F00
- Taiwan Technical and Science Diving Association CMAS code TPE/F02
- TDA - Thailand Diving Association CMAS code THA/F01
- TIDF - Israeli Diving Federation – Israeli nonprofit scuba diving association EUF CB 2012001
- Toa Engineering Corporation CMAS code IMA/F00 (Marianas)
- TSSF - Türkiye Sualti Sporlari Federasyonu (Turkish Underwater Sports Federation) CMAS code TUR/F00
- TVSÖ - Tauchsportverband Österreichs CMAS code AUT/F00
- UEF - Underwater Explorers' Federation (Hungary) CMAS code HUN/F01
- UFUSUA - Ukrainian Federation of Underwater Sport and Underwater Activities CMAS code UKR/F00
- UISP - Union Italienne Sport Pour Tous CMAS code ITA/F06
- Underwater Federation Republic of Kazakhstan CMAS code KAZ/F00
- USOA - Underwater Society of America – American national representative organization for underwater sport CMAS code USA/F00
- UTD - Unified Team Diving
- VDST - Verband Deutscher Sporttaucher. CMAS code GER/F00, EUF CB 2004002
- VDHT - Verband Deutscher Höhlentaucher since 2017
- VDTL - Verband Deutscher Tauchlehrer EUF CB 2009001
- VIT - Verband Internationaler Tauchschulen
- WADI- Worldwide Association of Diving Instructors
- WOSD - World Organisation of Scuba Diving EUF CB 2011002
- ZPS-SDA - Zväs Potapacov Slovenska (Slovak Diving Union) CMAS code SVK/F00

=== Recreational certification organisations no longer operating ===
- NASDS (USA) - National Association of Scuba Diving Schools only USA (Founded in the 1960s and merged with SSI in 1999)
- TAC - The Aquatic Club - existed in the UK between 1982 and 1986. dissolved organization
- YMCA SCUBA – Defunct recreational diver training and certification agency (1959-2008).

=== Technical diving certification agencies ===
Organisations which publish standards for competence in technical diving skills and knowledge, and issue certification for divers assessed as competent against these standards by affiliated schools or instructors:

- FlowState Divers - FlowState Divers
- ANDI - American Nitrox Divers International – Recreational diver training and certification agency
- BSAC - British Sub Aqua Club – Recreational diving club, training and certification agency based in the UK
- PADI TecRec (DSAT) - Professional Association of Diving Instructors – Recreational diver training and certification agency
- GUE - Global Underwater Explorers – Recreational/technical scuba training and certification agency
- IANTD - International Association of Nitrox and Technical Divers – Recreational and technical scuba training and certification agency CMAS code INT/F01
- IART - International Association of Rebreather Trainers
- ISC - International Scuba Certification
- ISE - InnerSpace Explorers
- NAUI Tech - National Association of Underwater Instructors – Non-profit training and certification agency association of scuba instructors
- ProTec - Professional Technical and Recreational Diving – Diver certification agency CMAS code INT/F08
- PSAI - Professional Scuba Association International
- PSS Technical Division - Professional Scuba Schools
- RAID - Recreational, Professional, Technical, and Rebreather training www.diveraid.com SAA - The Sub-Aqua Association – British recreational diver training and certification organisation CMAS code GBR/F03
- TDI - Technical Diving International – Technical diver training and certification agency EUF CB 2006002 CMAS code INT/F05
- SSI TXR - Scuba Schools International – Recreational scuba and freediving training and certification agency
- SwedTech Diving - SwedTech Diving
- UTD - Unified Team Diving
- NASE - National Academy of Scuba Educators – Recreational scuba training and certification agency
- ITDA - International Technical Diving Agency
- RAID - Rebreather Association of International Divers – Recreational diver training and certification agency
- ISSDA - International Surface Supply Diving Association
- DIWA - Diving Instructor World Association
- VDHT - Verband Deutscher Höhlentaucher since 2017,

=== Cave diving certification agencies ===
Organisations which publish standards for competence in cave diving skills and knowledge, and issue certification for divers assessed as competent against these standards by affiliated schools or instructors:

- ANDI - American Nitrox Divers International – Recreational diver training and certification agency
- CDAA - Cave Divers Association of Australia – Australian cave diving organisation
- CDG - Cave Diving Group – UK based cave diver training and certification agency
- GUE - Global Underwater Explorers – Recreational/technical scuba training and certification agency
- IANTD - International Association of Nitrox and Technical Divers – Recreational and technical scuba training and certification agency CMAS code INT/F01
- ISE - InnerSpace Explorers
- ITDA - International Technical Diving Agency
- NACD - National Association for Cave Diving – American non-profit organization for improving cave diving safety
- NASE - National Academy of Scuba Educators – Recreational scuba training and certification agency
- NAUI Tec- National Association of Underwater Instructors – Non-profit training and certification agency association of scuba instructors
- NSS-CDS - National Speleological Society Cave Diving Section – Organization for exploration, conservation, and study of caves in the United States
- ProTec - Professional Technical and Recreational Diving – Diver certification agency, Cave division. CMAS code INT/F08
- PSAI - Professional Scuba Association International
- SCD - Swiss Cave Diving
- UTD - Unified Team Diving
- TDI - Technical Diving International – Technical diver training and certification agency CMAS code INT/F05
- TSA - Trimix Scuba Association – Recreational technical scuba training and certification agency
- RAID - Rebreather Association of International Divers – Recreational diver training and certification agency
- VDHT - Verband Deutscher Höhlentaucher since 2017

== Freediving and snorkelling certification agencies ==
Organisations which publish standards for competence in freediving and snorkelling skills and knowledge, and issue certification for divers assessed as competent against these standards by affiliated schools or instructors:

- AIDA International – Worldwide rule- and record-keeping body for competitive breath-hold events
- Apnea Academy
- Apnea Total
- AUF - Australian Underwater Federation – Governing body for underwater sports
- CMAS - Confédération Mondiale des Activités Subaquatiques – International organisation for underwater activities
- FII - Freediving Instructors International
- IANTD -International Association of Nitrox and Technical Divers – Recreational and technical scuba training and certification agency
- Molchanovs Freediving Education
- ISC/IFC - International Scuba Certification (International Freediver Certification) |url=ISC DIVER — International Scuba Certification | Learn - Connect - Explore /
- PFI - Performance Freediving International – Freediver training agency
- PADI Professional Association of Diving Instructors – Recreational diver training and certification agency
- Pure Apnea - Specialising in both sports and recreational freediving. Currently the only freedive education system separating competitive from recreational freediving (www.pureapnea.com)
- ProTec - Professional Technical and Recreational Diving – Diver certification agency, Apnoea division CMAS code INT/F08
- PSS - Professional Scuba Schools
- SSI Freediving – Recreational scuba and freediving training and certification agency
- RAID World Series Freediving – Recreational diver training and certification agency

== Commercial diver training and registration authorities ==
Organisations which publish standards for competence in commercial diving skills and knowledge, and issue certification for divers assessed as competent against these standards by registered or affiliated schools:

- ADCI – Association of Diving Contractors International
- ACDE – Association of Commercial Diving Educators
- ADAS – Australian Diver Accreditation Scheme – Australian based international occupational diver accreditation organisation
- CSA Group – Canadian standards development organisation
- DCBC – Diver's Certification Board of Canada
- HSE – Health and Safety Executive of the United Kingdom – Health and safety body in Great Britain
- ITDA - International Technical Diving Agency
- Standards Australia – National standards body for Australia
- WorkSafeBC – Statutory agency in British Columbia, Canada (Workers Compensation Board British Columbia)
- (SA)DEL – Department of Employment and Labour (South Africa) – Department of the South African government responsible for matters related to employment
- Sicilian online repertory of commercial divers – Department of Employment and Labour of Sicilian regional government (Regione siciliana) keeps an online repertory of commercial divers trained according IDSA standards

Organisations specifically certifying public safety divers:

- DRI - Dive Rescue International
- ERDI - Emergency Response Diving International – American organisation for training and certification of emergency response divers

== Scientific diving certification agencies ==
Organisations which publish standards for competence in scientific diving skills and knowledge, and issue certification for divers assessed as competent against these standards by affiliated schools or instructors:

- AAUS - American Academy of Underwater Sciences
- CAUS - Canadian Association for Underwater Science
- The Scientific Committee of CMAS
- DIA - Dive International Agency
- SDSC - Scientific Diving Supervisory Committee

== Other certification agencies for skills associated with diving ==
=== Dedicated diver first aid & rescue training ===
- DAN - Divers Alert Network
- ILS - International Life Saving Federation

=== Maritime archaeology ===
- NAS - Nautical Archaeology Society

== Professional associations for diving instructors ==
- ANMP - Association nationale des moniteurs de plongée (France)
- CEDIP - European Committee of Professional Diving Instructors (Comité Européen Des Instructeurs de Plongée professionnels)

== International standards, accreditation and quality assurance organisations ==
- CMAS - Confédération Mondiale des Activités Subaquatiques
- EUF - European Underwater Federation
- IDSA – International Diving Schools Association
- IMCA – International Marine Contractors Association
- RTC - Rebreather Training Council
- WRSTC - World Recreational Scuba Training Council
- DSRN - Diving Standards & Recognition Network
