= Introductory diving =

Non-certification scuba diving experience

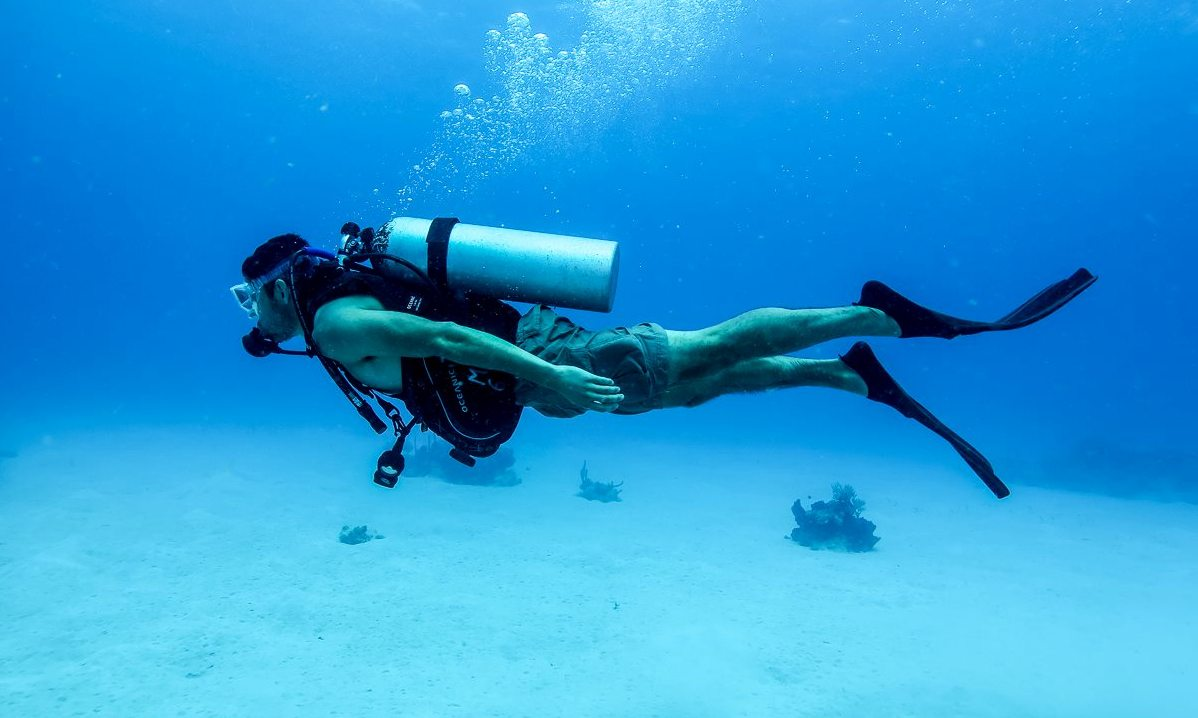
Discover Scuba Diving in St. Croix, US Virgin Islands

Introductory diving, also known as introductory scuba experience, trial diving and resort diving are dives where people without diver training or certification can experience scuba diving under the guidance of a recreational diving instructor. Introductory diving is an opportunity for interested people to find out by practical experience at a relatively low cost if they would be interested in greater involvement in scuba diving. For scuba instructors and diving schools is it an opportunity to acquire new customers. An introductory diving experience is much less time-consuming and costly than the completion of autonomous diver training, but has little lasting value, as it is an experience program only, for which no certification is issued. Introductory scuba diving experiences are intended to introduce people to recreational diving, and increase the potential client base of dive shops to include people who do not have the time or inclination to complete an entry-level certification program.

== Procedure ==
PADI education system

Participants are usually required to read and sign waivers to minimise liability of the program provider, and to provide a declaration that they do not suffer from any medical condition listed that would be an unacceptable risk for diving. Prior to the dive itself, an instructor teaches essential theoretical knowledge, so that the participants can dive with a low level of risk, and with informed consent. After putting on the necessary diving equipment, the participant enters the water under close supervision of the instructor. Breathing from the scuba regulator is first practiced at the water surface. At a shallow depth, clearing the diving mask, removing the regulator from the mouth and replacing and clearing it of water are learned. These two skills are essential for the safety of the participants. Afterwards, there may be an opportunity to either play underwater games or explore the surroundings in shallow water. Trial diving usually takes about two to four hours.

The participant learns the basic minimum safety guidelines and skills needed to dive under the direct supervision of a diving professional. If an open water dive is included, a few more basic skills will be practiced in confined water. The course includes:

- Introduction to the scuba equipment used to dive and how to move around underwater using the equipment.
- Breathing underwater on open circuit scuba and how to avoid barotrauma.
- Learning some of the key skills that are used during every scuba dive.
- Swimming around and exploring within the limits of the program and the local environment.
- Information on how to enroll in a training course to become a certified entry-level recreational scuba diver through the providing agency.

=== Venue ===
Usually the introductory diving first takes place in confined water, which usually means a swimming pool or a very shallow and safe place in a lake or the sea. Depending on the offer, after the first dive in confined water, a second or further shallow dives may be done in suitable confined or open water.

=== Altitude and flying after diving ===
People can go directly from high altitude to scuba diving, but should not scuba dive then go up in altitude without allowing an interval, depending on the time and depth of the dive, to reduce risk of decompression sickness. The Divers Alert Network (DAN) Flying after Diving workshop of 2002 recommended a 12-hour surface interval for uncertified individuals who took part in an introductory scuba experience before flying or ascending to an altitude greater than, or cabin pressure less than, an altitude equivalent of 2,000 feet (610 m).

== Prerequisites ==
CMAS education system

The diving school may ask that the participants of the trial dive prove their medical fitness to dive with a medical certificate, but more commonly they will use a standardized form for the participant to declare their self assessment of fitness to dive.

From the age of 8 years it is possible to take part in an introductory dive, but some providers require a greater age. The participant should be able to swim at least 25 metres (82 ft) without any buoyancy aid.

== Introductory diving programs ==
The international standard ISO 11121 standardizes the minimum requirements for an "Introductory Training Program". Despite the standardization, the title and contents of the program vary depending on the provider and their membership of a diver certification agency. The following programs are based on ISO 11121.

=== CMAS ===
The CMAS Introductory Scuba Experience participants should be at least 14 years of age and able to swim. The "Introductory Scuba Experience" includes a theory lesson, a confined water dive where several diving skills are practiced and an open water dive to a maximum depth of 10 metres (33 ft).

=== NAUI ===
Participants in a NAUI Try scuba / Passport Diver program must be at least 10 years old. However, it is possible to take part in a confined water dive from the age of 8 years. The "Try scuba" program includes a theory lesson and a confined water dive where participants practice several dive skills, and one or more open water dives. The first open water dive has recommended depth limit of 6 metres (20 ft). For further dives there is a limit of 12 metres (39 ft). Participants who have completed two open water dives will receive an "NAUI Passport Diver" confirmation. It enables them to participate in further open water introductory dives later on, guided by a NAUI instructors, without repeating the confined water dive.

The "Tandem Diver" program is an alternative to the "NAUI Try scuba" and differs mainly by the individual supervision of the participant and lack of the opportunities offered by the "NAUI Passport Diver".

=== PADI ===
SSI education system

Participants in a PADI "Discover Scuba Diving" program should be at least 10 years old and should be able to swim. The program includes a theory lesson and a confined water dive where basic diving skills are practiced. Afterwards, one or more directly supervised open water dives can be done to a maximum depth of 12 metres (39 ft). Discover Scuba Diving includes the theoretical content and skills of the first lesson of the PADI Open Water Diver course, and this experience may be credited as the first confined water dive of a PADI Open Water Diver course if done within for one year,

The PADI Discover Scuba Diving course allows for repetitive diving experiences within a time limit at the discretion of the dive instructor and dive shop. This is a common request for people who try diving, then want to repeat the activity (often at a different location).

The "Bubblemaker" program is a trial dive in the swimming pool for children from 8 years of age. The participants are introduced to scuba diving in a playful way by a scuba instructor. The maximum allowed diving depth is 2 metres (7 ft).

=== SSI ===
Participants in a Scuba Schools International "Try scuba" experience must be at least 8 years old. The course takes place in confined water to a maximum depth of 5 metres (16 ft), and includes a theory session.

For an SSI "Try Scuba Diving" experience the participant must be at least 10 years old. The course is similar to the "Try Scuba" (pool) program, but it includes an open water dive with a depth limit of 12 metres (39 ft), and can be credited towards an SSI Open Water Diver course later.

== Other types of introductory diving ==
There are programs for advanced divers that are also called introductory diving. These include programs that allow an experienced diver to try out technical diving, rebreather, or cave diving.
