= Steve Lewis =

Steve, Stephen, or Steven Lewis may refer to:

== Arts and entertainment ==
- Stephen Lewis (actor) (1926–2015), English actor
- Stephen Brimson Lewis, British scenic designer
- Steve Lewis (musician) (1896–1941), American jazz pianist and composer
- C. J. Lewis (born Steven James Lewis, 1967), British reggae singer

== Sports ==
- Steve Lewis (racing), American racing team owner
- Steve Lewis Jr. (born 1999), American stock car racing driver
- Steve Lewis (sprinter) (born 1969), American track and field athlete and Olympic champion in 400 metres from 1988
- Steven Lewis (born 1986), British pole vaulter

== Others ==
- Stephen Lewis (1937–2026), Canadian politician and diplomat
- Steve Lewis (diver) (born 1950), cave and wreck diver
