= Steve Lewis (diver) =

Technical scuba diver and author

Steve Lewis (born 1950) is an active cave and wreck diver. Born in Peckham, New Cross London, he currently resides in Muskoka, Ontario Canada.

== Teaching Credentials ==
Lewis has been an instructor-trainer with Technical Diving International (TDI) since its formation in 1994. Lewis served as a member of its Training Advisory Panel until 2005 when he became director of product development for International Training, and later served as the Marketing and Communications director for TDI, Scuba Diving International (SDI) and Emergency Response Diving International (ERDI) the public safety diver certifying branch of International Training.

From 2010 until the present he works as an adventure travel, marketing, and training consultant for various clients in the public and private sectors.

In September 2015, he was named as a factory-sanctioned instructor-trainer on the SF2 rebreather by ScubaForce USA And in November of that year, was appointed as a member of the College of Fellows of the Royal Canadian Geographical Society.

In February 2016, Lewis joined RAID Rebreather Association of International Divers as an instructor-trainer and developed that organization's cave diving program.

In June 2019, Lewis took over the position of Director of Diver Training with RAID as Paul Vincent Toomer vacated the seat and became RAID's president. His responsibilities include reworking the agency's training materials and course standards.

Following the sale of RAID to (the DRI investment group in January 2022), Lewis became one of the agency's shareholders and left the training department to take on the role of Vice President of Marketing.

== Publications ==
He has published dozens of articles about diving and diver training for various publications and is managing editor of Diving Adventure Magazine. Lewis has written several textbooks and instructor guides such as TDI's Advanced Trimix and SDI's Solo Diver, Nitrox, and Advanced Adventure Programs. His books on diving include: The Six Skills and Other Discussions, a guide for technical divers; and Staying Alive: Applying Risk Management to Advanced Scuba Diving. In August 2018, Lewis published Death in Number Two Shaft the account of the aftermath of the death of his close friend Joe Steffen during the first expedition to Bell Island Mine.

== Bell Island mine expedition ==
Lewis is a member of The Explorers Club and in 2006 led a team that photographed and assessed the Bell Island iron ore mine for "condition, safety and feasibility" of future research. The Bell Island mine is located off Newfoundland's Avalon Peninsula in Conception Bay. Their report also provided the Bell Island Heritage Society with important information on artifacts left when mining operations ended in the 1940s.

On February 4, 2007, Lewis's good friend and expedition member Joseph T. Steffen lost his life on a dive into the mine. The project continued despite the loss of this explorer and team members managed to lay approximately two kilometers of line and document many of the mine's artifacts.

In February 2016, Lewis and several other notable technical divers returned to Bell Island Mine to continue the work begun in 2007.
