= American Nitrox Divers International =

Recreational diver training and certification agency

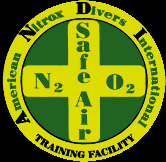
- Abbreviation: ANDI
- Formation: 1988
- Type: NGO
- Headquarters: Freeport, New York
- Location(s): 74 Woodcleft Avenue Freeport; New York 11520-3342
- Region served: World wide
- President: Ed Betts
- Website: www.andihq.com

American Nitrox Divers International (or ANDI) was founded by Ed Betts and Dick Rutkowski in 1988.

ANDI has since expanded to include offices in The United Kingdom, Israel, Australia, Sweden, Italy, Germany, The Netherlands, Greece, Japan, Taiwan, Republic of Korea, Republic of Maldives, Republic of Philippines, Latin America, Middle East, with its home office in the United States of America.

"SafeAir" is ANDI's term of art for breathing mixtures with extra oxygen added that are commonly known as nitrox or Enriched Air Nitrox (EAN).

== Origins and history ==
ANDI was founded by Ed Betts and Dick Rutkowski in 1988 for the following purpose - "to standardize Instructor Training, Sport Diver Training, and refill station dispensing procedures for Enriched Air Nitrox diving." It is one of the first diver training organisations to specialize in technical diving and in the delivery of training for the use of nitrox. Between the years 1989 and 2000, ANDI is reported by the Divers Alert Network as certifying 49,118 divers out of a global total of 233,798 in the use of nitrox along with the certification of 3,196 instructors (out of a global total of 32,924) to specifically teach nitrox.

== Certification ==
ANDI offers training programs for recreational diving, use of nitrox, technical diving (including rebreather), gas blending, equipment service, diver first aid and hyperbaric chamber personnel. Each program is identified by "a three-letter course code". Programs specific to diver training are also classified by a "Level of Training" in order to "differentiate the programs and their scope of training" with Level 1 (L1) being "an introductory program for new divers or divers-in-training" while Level 5 (L5) is used for the highest level of training, i.e. "exploration courses" that "involve the use of other inert gases".

=== Open Water certification ===
- Introductory Scuba Experience - ISE
- ANDI Surface Diver - ASD
- Confined Environment Diver - CED
- Junior Sport Diver - (L1) JSD
- Open Water Sport Diver - (L1) OWD
- Ocean Scuba Diver-L2 OSD
- Ocean Diver - (L2) OCD
- Ocean Adventurer - (L2) OCA
- Advanced Open Water Diver - (L2) AOW
- Ocean Explorer - (L2) OCE
- Expert Scuba Diver - (L2) ESD
- Ocean Expert Explorer - (L2) OEE
- Rescue Diver - (L2) RSD
- Openwater Divemaster - (L2) CDM
- Assistant Instructor - (L2) ASI
- Open Water Instructor - (L1&2) OWI
- Advanced Openwater Instructor - AOWI
- Master Instructor - (L2) MSI

=== Specialty certification ===
- Dry Suit Diver - DSD
- Dry Suit Instructor - DSI
- Diver Propulsion Vehicle - DPV
- Night Diver - NGT
- Boat Diver - BOT
- Deeper Water Diver - DWD
- Navigation Diver - NAV
- Specialty Instructor - (L1-2) SPI
- Marine Environmentalist Specialty (MES)
- Total Buoyancy Control Specialty (TBC)

=== SafeAir (Nitrox) certification ===
- Limited SafeAir User - (L1) LSU
- Complete SafeAir User - (L2) CSU
- SafeAir Instructor - (L1 & 2) LSI & CSI
- SafeAir Wreck Diver - (L2) SWD
- Altitude Diver Specialty - (L2) ALD
- Specialty Instructor - (L2)
- SafeAir Divemaster - (L2) SDM
- Cavern Diver - (L2) CVN
- Cavern Diver Instructor - (L2) CVI

=== Technical certification ===
- Technical SafeAir Diver - (L3) TSD
- Technical Tri-Mix Diver - (L3) TTM
- Solo Diver - (L3) SLD
- Technical Wreck Diver - (L3) TWD
- Technical SafeAir Instructor - (L3) TSI
- Technical Instructor (Specialty) - (L3)
- Technical Divemaster - (L3) TDM
- Cave Diver (L3) CAV
- Cave Diver Instructor - (L3) CAI

=== Exploration certification ===
- Extended Range Diver - (L4) ERD
- Extended Range Instructor - (L4) ERI
- Intermediate Tri-Mix Diver - (L5) ITM
- Tri-Mix Diver - (L5) TMD
- Exploration Divemaster - (L4 & 5) EDM
- Tri-Mix Instructor - (L5) TMI
- Cave Explorer - (L4) CVX
- Cave Explorer Instructor - (L4) CXI
- Cave Explorer - (L5) CVX
- Cave Explorer Instructor - (L5) CXI

=== Rebreather certification ===
- Rebreather Intro - (L1) ICC
- Rebreather Diver - (L2) CCR
- Rebreather Diver - (L2) SCR
- Technical Rebreather Diver - (L3) TRD
- Rebreather Explorer - (L5) ERE
- Rebreather Instructor - (L1&2) RBI Technical Rebreather Instructor - (L3) TRI
- Exploration Rebreather Inst. - (L5) XRI

=== Technician certification ===
- Gas Blender - CGB
- Advanced Gas Blender - AGB
- Gas Blender Instructor - GBI
- Breathing Gas Dispenser Tech - BDT
- Breathing Gas Maintenance Tech - BMT
- SafeAir Service Technician - CST
- Service Technician Instructor - STI
- Eddy Current Tech - ECT
- Cylinder Inspection Technician - CIT
- Apprentice Service Technician - AST
- Professional Service Technician - PST
- Senior Service Technician - SST
- Master Service Technician - MST

=== Dive Medic certification ===
- Oxygen Administration Provider - OXP
- Oxygen Administration Instructor - OXI
- CPR Provider - CPR
- CPR Instructor - CPI
- First Aid Provider - FAP
- First Responder - FRS
- Dive Medic - DMD
- Dive Medic Instructor - DMI

=== Hyperbarics certification ===
- Hyperbaric Chamber Awareness - HCA: Introductory background on chamber applications.
- Hyperbaric Chamber Tender - HCT: Basic theory and procedures of hyperbaric chamber operation to assist a qualified chamber operator in a clinical environment.
- Hyperbaric Chamber Operator - HCO (3 levels): Unit-specific chamber operation skills and the necessary theoretical background.
- Certified Hyperbaric Technician - CHT: Practical and theoretical chamber related equipment maintenance and operation skills.
- Hyperbaric Chamber Operator Instructor - HCI

== Recognition ==
ANDI obtained CEN certification from the EUF certification body in 2005.

ANDI ratings for recreational diving supervision and instruction are recognized by the Health and Safety Executive in the United Kingdom as of 2015.

ANDI is recognized as a technical diving organisation by the Chamber of Diving and Watersports in Egypt as of 2016.

== See also ==
- List of diver certification organizations – Agencies which issue certification for competence in diving skills
