= IDSA =

IDSA may stand for:

- Identity School of Acting
- Industrial Designers Society of America
- Infectious Diseases Society of America
- Interactive Digital Software Association, former name of the Entertainment Software Association
- Institute for Defence Studies and Analyses
- International Dark-Sky Association (whose formal acronym is actually IDA)
- International Diving Schools Association
- Manohar Parrikar Institute for Defence Studies and Analyses (MP-IDSA)
