= Trimix Scuba Association =

Recreational technical scuba training and certification agency

The Trimix Scuba Association (TSA) is a diver training organization specializing in training and certification in technical diving and the safe use of nitrox and trimix.

TSA was founded in Switzerland and has been active in Italy since 1997, offering courses specific to the use of both binary gas mixtures, such as Nitrox and Heliox, and ternary, such as Trimix.

Since January 2006 recreational diving has been included in its educational programs, with the aim of improving safety in this type of simple and enjoyable diving in both freediving and scuba diving.

There are also specific courses for semi-closed circuit rebreathers (SCR).
