= Recreational diver training =

Training process for people who do not dive at work

Scuba diving education levels as used by ISO, PADI, CMAS, SSI and NAUI

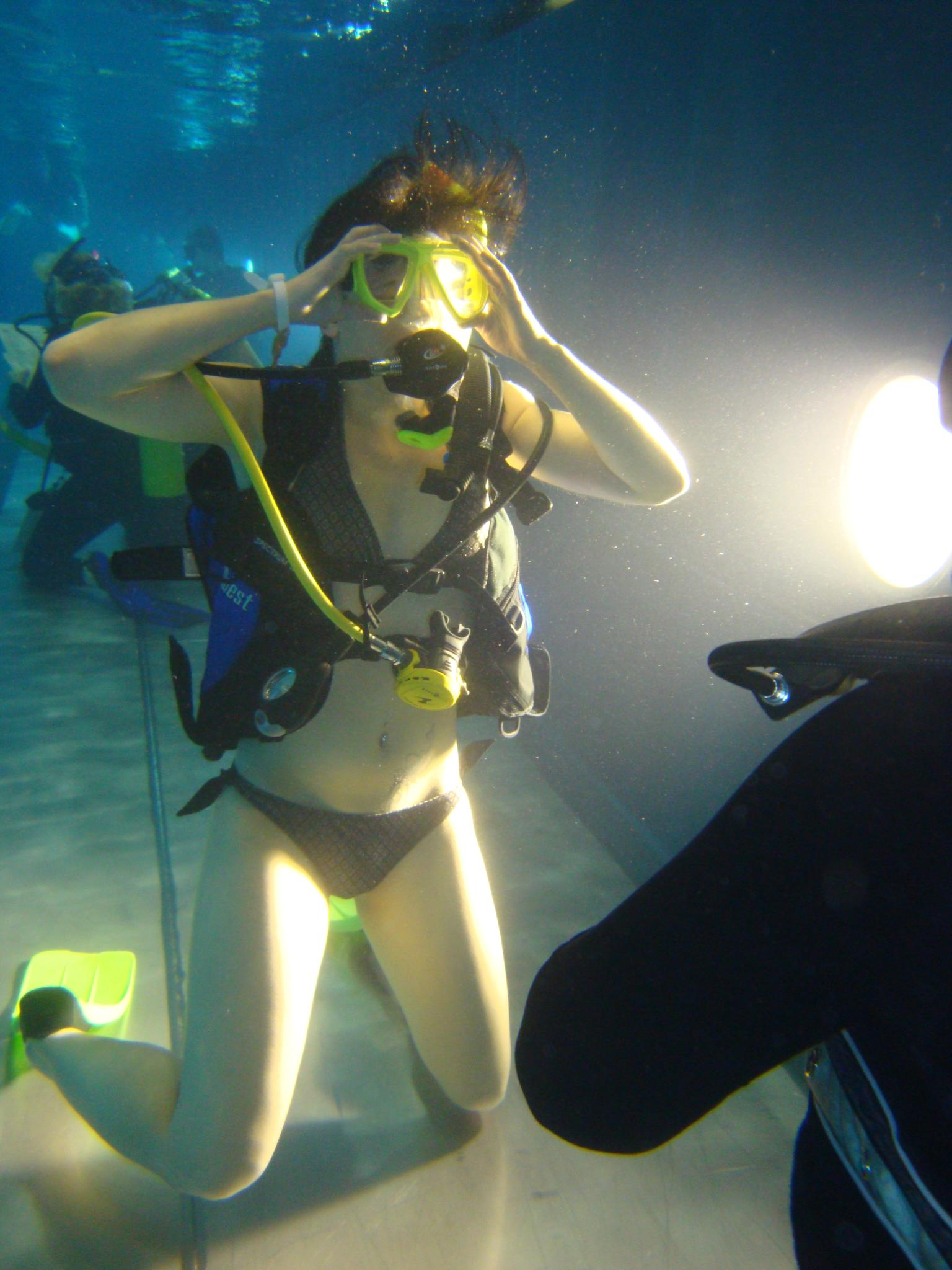
Basic diving skills training in a swimming pool

Recreational diver training is the process of developing knowledge and understanding of the basic principles, and the skills and procedures for the use of scuba equipment so that the diver is able to dive for recreational purposes with acceptable risk using the type of equipment and in similar conditions to those experienced during training.

Not only is the underwater environment hazardous but the diving equipment itself can be dangerous. There are problems that divers must learn to avoid and manage when they do occur. Divers need repeated practice and a gradual increase in challenge to develop and internalise the skills needed to control the equipment, to respond effective if they encounter difficulties, and to build confidence in their equipment and themselves. Diver practical training starts with simple but essential procedures, and builds on them until complex procedures can be managed effectively. This may be broken up into several short training programmes, with certification issued for each stage, or combined into a few more substantial programmes with certification issued when all the skills have been mastered.

Many diver training organizations exist, throughout the world, offering diver training leading to certification: the issuing of a "diving certification card," also known as a "C-card," or qualification card. This diving certification model originated at Scripps Institution of Oceanography in 1952 after two divers died while using university-owned equipment and the SIO instituted a system where a card was issued after training as evidence of competence. Diving instructors affiliated to a diving certification agency may work independently or through a university, a dive club, a dive school or a dive shop.

They will offer courses that should meet or exceed the standards of the certification organization that will certify the divers attending the course. The International Organization for Standardization has approved six recreational diving standards that may be implemented worldwide, and some of the standards developed by the (United States) RSTC are consistent with the applicable ISO Standards:

The initial open water training for a person who is medically fit to dive and a reasonably competent swimmer is relatively short. Many dive shops in popular holiday locations offer courses intended to teach a novice to dive in a few days, which can be combined with diving on the vacation. Other instructors and dive schools will provide more thorough training, which generally takes longer. Dive operators, dive shops, and cylinder filling stations may refuse to allow uncertified people to dive with them, hire diving equipment or have their diving cylinders filled. This may be an agency standard, company policy, or specified by legislation.

== Types of training ==
Most recreational diver training is for certification purposes, but a significant amount is for non-certification purposes such as introductory scuba experience, refresher training, and regional orientation. Mainstream recreational diver training starts with an entry-level course, focused on the skills of operating the equipment safely, which is intended to be followed by further training focused on the environment and other skills, but many recreational divers never progress further than their entry level certification, and may not dive often enough to maintain the basic skills learned on the course. Refresher courses are offered by many diving schools to remedy this possible loss of competence due to lack of practice.

=== Entry-level ===
The entry-level course is for certification of competence to dive in open water to a limited depth and not incurring a decompression obligation requiring decompression stops, so that the diver can make a direct ascent to the surface at any time at an acceptable level of risk. Entry level training does not generally require the diver to be competent to rescue another diver, though some training in sharing breathing gas is standard, and divers are expected to dive in the company of a dive buddy of equivalent certification. Entry level certification to the internationally recognised Autonomous diver standard ISO 24801-2 and the equivalent European Standard EN 14153-2 is most widely accepter.

Supervised diver certification is offered by some training agencies as an entry-level programme, and a certificate is issued, but the diver is required to dive only under the direct supervision of a recreational diving professional, such as a divemaster or instructor. The certification aligns with international standard ISO 24801-1, and the equivalent European Standard EN 14153-1. Most diving organizations recommend not to exceed a diving depth of 10 to 12 metres. In some parts of the world there is a minimum requirement which corresponds to the Autonomous Diver certification and an in-date medical certificate for hiring diving equipment and taking part in recreational diving. In these places a certificate which corresponds to the Supervised Diver is regarded as insufficient.

==== Refresher courses ====
A scuba refresher course is a voluntary training intervention which mainly targets the autonomous diver, which is the certification level most likely to be associated with inactive recreational divers, and which includes the most basic knowledge and skills. In principle a refresher course could be a checkout at any certification level, and could cover either or both skills and knowledge, but in practice the most common refresher courses are offered for the divers most likely to need one, which are entry-level divers with little experience and a long gap since their last dive.

The Professional Association of Diving Instructors (PADI) course is called ReActivate, and Scuba Schools International (SSI) offers a similar course named Scuba Skills Update. They include a theory component which can be done on-line, and a practical skills component that can be done under the supervision of a divemaster or instructor, and starts with checkout of setting up the scuba equipment and water entry techniques, and continues with assessing critical skills like mask recovery and clearing, neutral buoyancy, ditching weights and ascent using an alternative air source. PADI suggest a refresher after six months inactivity, but the actual need depends on the previous experience and skill of the diver.

A refresher course almost always includes a confined water skill practice session, and may include an open water dive. Some schools expect the diver to revise the theory as well. This would typically be on-line, but there may be a live discussion and feedback session.

=== Further training ===
Further training is focused on core diving skills, skills associated with the environment and equipment (specialty courses), safety and mutual assistance (Rescue diver), dive group leadership (Dive leader) and training other divers (Diving instructor). Some training providers require or encourage the diver to gain experience at their current level between training programmes, others are willing to enroll the diver on the next course as soon as they are available to start. Dive planning and safety relevant to the current skill level is included in each course. Some agencies approach further training by packaging a significant number of skills together and provide the training as an integrated unit, which is relatively efficient in overall time and cost, while others break it down into smaller programs, each dealing with a limited group of associated skills, which can be sold to the customer separately, which can be convenient if the diver does not want to invest the time and effort to do it all at once, but will generally cost more in total.

- Core diving competence skills
- Dive leadership skills
- Specialist skills
  - Equipment related skills
  - Environment related skills
  - Activity related skills
  - Safety and rescue skills
  - Diving support skills
  - Dever training skills

=== Dive leadership training ===
Dive leader describes the minimum requirements for dive leader training and certification for recreational scuba divers in international standard ISO 24801-3 and the equivalent European Standard EN 14153-3. Various organizations offer training that meets the requirements of the dive leader standard. Some agencies use the title "Dive Leader" for their equivalent certification, but several other titles are also used, "Divemaster" may be the most widespread, but "Dive Supervisor" is also used, and should not be confused with the very different status and responsibilities of a professional diving supervisor. CMAS affiliates certifications which meet the requirements of CMAS 3-star diver should meet the standard by default.

Scuba dive leaders are considered competent to plan, organise and conduct dives and to lead other recreational divers on open water dives, and for specialised recreational scuba diving activities for which they have been trained. They are also considered competent to conduct emergency procedures associated with these activities and the relevant diving environment. They may require orientation for unfamiliar local environmental conditions. Additional specialised training and experience is required to lead divers on more demanding dives.

The term is also used by BSAC for a specific certification.

=== Recreational diving instructor training ===
Minimum requirements to attend a recreational diving instructor training programme vary between certification agencies. The requirements for PADI Instructor Development Course (IDC) are 6 months as a certified diver, Registration as a PADI Divemaster, with 60 logged dives, a medical statement that the applicant does not suffer from a disqualifying medical condition and recent participation in PADI Emergency First Response training. The IDC takes five to seven days, and comprises two parts, Assistant Instructor training and Open Water Scuba Instructor training. During the IDC the candidate will learn PADI Standards and Procedures, The PADI system of instruction, diver safety and risk management, The role of the diving instructor in the recreational diving industry, and marketing and sales counseling for recreational diving business. 100 logged dives are required before the applicant can take the two-day Instructor Examination. PADI puts more emphasis on the business side of recreational diving than most other organisations. Other certification agencies often have more stringent requirements,

Certification as an entry-level instructor authorises the holder to train entry-level divers and usually also specialties the instructor also holds. Training in specialties generally requires the instructor to be qualified in those specialties, but in several cases they are prerequisites for training as an instructor.

=== Technical diving training ===
Technical diving is legally a type of recreational diving, but generally requires significantly greater competence to manage the higher risks of the environment, equipment and physiological challenges chosen by the technical diver. Errors and malfunctions that may be merely inconvenient in shallow open-water recreational dives within the no-decompression limits, may be rapidly fatal in overhead or deep, staged decompression dives. The necessary level of understanding of the principles, hazards and possible consequences, and the skills and procedures for managing the equipment and foreseeable contingencies is commensurately greater.

=== Rebreather diver training ===
Rebreather diving for recreational purposes is generally classed as technical diving, and the training is provided by the technical diver certification agencies. Training in the use of rebreathers has two components: Generic training for the class of rebreather, including the theory of operation and the general procedures, and specific training for the model of rebreather, which covers the details of preparation, testing, user maintenance and troubleshooting, and those details of normal operating and emergency procedures which are specific to the model of rebreather. Crossover training from one model to another generally only requires the second aspect if the equipment is similar in design and operation.

== Training providers ==
Many diver training organizations exist, throughout the world, offering diver training leading to certification: the issuing of a "diver certification card," also known as a "C-card," or qualification card. This diver certification model originated at Scripps Institution of Oceanography in 1952 after two divers died while using university-owned equipment and the SIO instituted a system where a card was issued after training as evidence of competence.

Diving instructors affiliated to a diving certification agency may work independently or through a university, a dive club, a dive school or a dive shop. They will offer courses that should meet, or exceed, the standards of the certification organization that will certify the divers attending the course.

== Duration of training ==
Recreational diver training courses range from minor specialties which require one classroom session and an open water dive, and which may be completed in a day, to complex specialties which may take several days to weeks, and require several classroom sessions, confined water skills training and practice, and a substantial number of open-water dives, followed by rigorous assessment of knowledge and skills. Details on the approximate duration of training can be found on the websites of most certification agencies, but accurate schedules are generally only available from the specific school or instructor who will present that course, as this will depend on the local conditions and other constraints.

The initial open water training for a person who is medically fit to dive and a reasonably competent swimmer is relatively short. Many dive shops in popular holiday locations offer courses intended to teach a novice to dive in a few days, which can be combined with diving on the vacation. Other instructors and dive schools will provide more thorough training, which generally takes longer.

== Location of training lessons ==
Initial training typically takes place in three environments:

- Classroom - where material is presented and reviewed. This may be partially or wholly substituted by on-line learning, which may include on-line assessment.
- Confined water (Swimming pool or equivalent natural body of water) - where skills are taught by demonstration and initially practiced.
- Open water - where the learner demonstrates and refines the skills he or she has learned in an environment reasonably similar to the expected actual diving environment, and gains some experience of realistic conditions in a typical diving environment.

The usual sequence for learning most diving skills is to be taught the theory in the classroom, be shown the skills and practice them in a swimming pool or sheltered and shallow open water using the minimum equipment, then practice again in open water under supervision in full equipment and only then use the skill on real dives. Typically, early open water training takes place in a local body of water such as a lake, a flooded quarry or a sheltered and shallow part of the sea. Advanced training mostly takes place at depths and locations similar to the diver's normal diving environment.

=== Referral systems ===
Some certification agencies use a diver referral system, where a diver's open water training can be completed by another instructor at a place where diving conditions are more desirable. This allows the learner to complete their training on a vacation while not wasting vacation time on classroom and pool training sessions. The Universal Referral Program allows the open-water training to be done by an instructor from a different agency,

== Training topics ==
The PADI training system.

The CMAS training system.

The SSI training system.

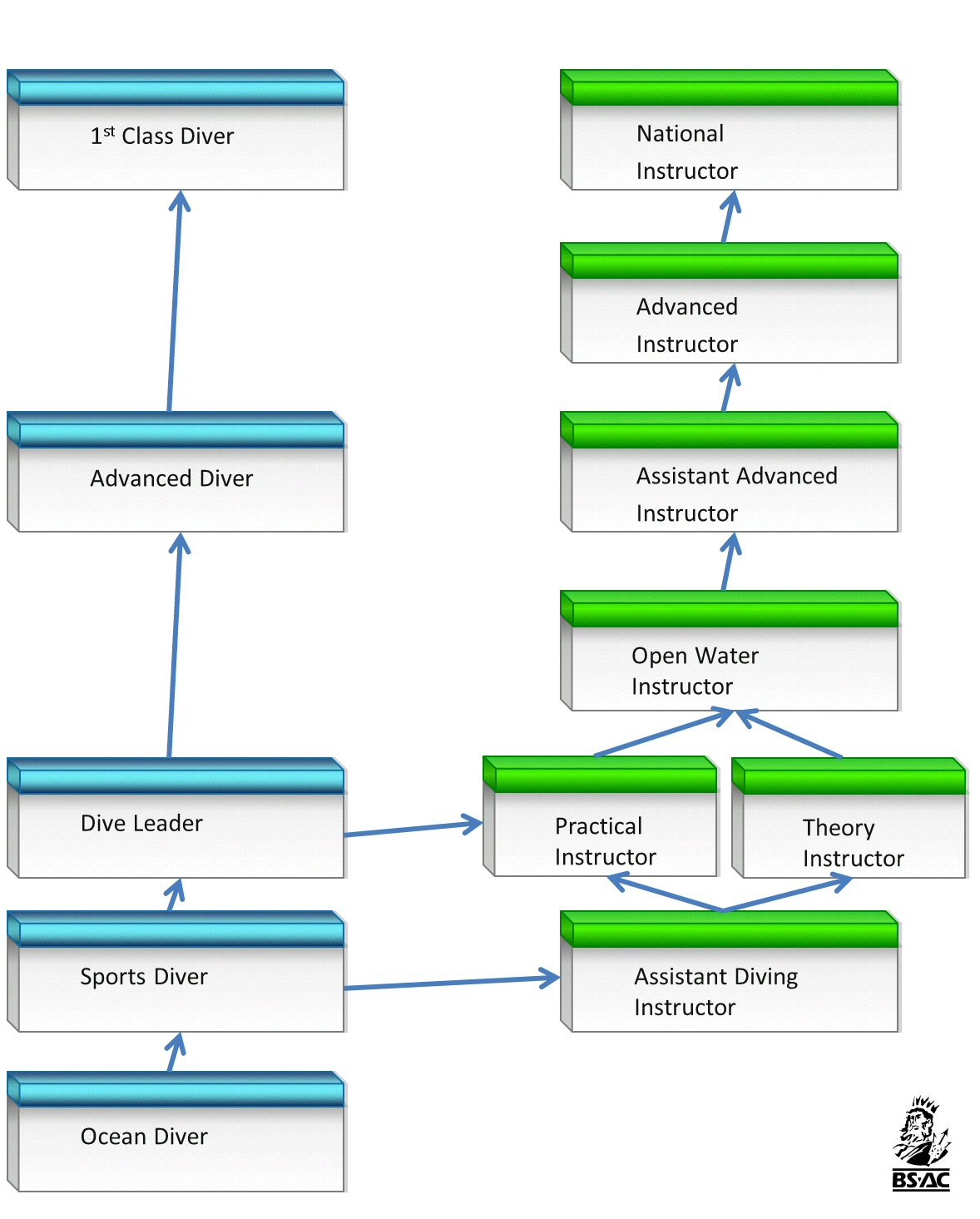
The BSAC diving and instructor grades.

Most entry-level training is similar across the diver training agencies, although some may emphasize certain topics earlier in the program, such as the inclusion of diver rescue in syllabuses such as CMAS 1* and NAUI, and its absence from other equivalent courses such as PADI Open Water Diver.

Many of the skills listed below are not included in entry-level training, and where they are it may be only a subset of the range of skills in that category.

- Basic diving theory:
  - Diving physics
  - Scuba equipment
  - Physiology of diving
  - Diving hazards and precautions
  - Diving signals
  - Buddy system
- Basic water skills:
  - Finning and mobility in-water
  - Fitting and clearing a diving mask
  - Snorkeling
  - Shallow freediving
  - Entering and exiting the water (seated entry, ladder exit, giant step entry, etc.)
- Basic open circuit scuba equipment skills:
  - Preparing the scuba equipment
  - Pre-dive checks:
    - Buddy check
  - Water entries and exits with scuba gear
  - Breathing from scuba equipment
  - Buoyancy control, trim and stability using weights, the buoyancy compensator and the lungs
  - Underwater mobility and maneuvering
  - Ascents and descents
  - Diving mask clearing
  - Demand valve clearing and recovery
  - Air sharing
  - Emergency ascents
    - Controlled emergency swimming ascent
    - Assisted ascent
- Basic rebreather diving skills:
  - Preparing the diving rebreather
  - Buoyancy control with a rebreather
  - Rebreather ascents and descents
  - Diving mask clearing and mouthpiece draining
  - Bailing out to an alternative breathing gas supply
  - Bail-out ascent
  - Rebreather diluent flush
  - Venting the rebreather loop
  - Draining the rebreather loop
- Dive planning skills:
  - Buddy system
  - Use of decompression tables
  - Use of Dive computers
  - Breathing gas requirement calculations
  - Dive risk assessment:
    - Safe dive site selection
    - Choosing appropriate equipment
    - Precautions for night diving and drift diving
  - Solo diving
- Dive monitoring and management skills:
  - Depth and time discipline
  - Gas management
  - Use of surface marker buoys
  - Use of decompression buoys
  - Use of distance lines
  - Use of diving shots
  - Compass navigation
  - Underwater pilotage
  - Doing decompression stops
- Diver rescue techniques:
  - Controlled buoyant lift
  - Towing a diver and landing a casualty
  - In-water artificial respiration
  - CPR on land
  - Oxygen first aid on land
  - General First aid
- Technical diving techniques:
  - Using Nitrox as a bottom gas
    - Analyzing proportion of oxygen in a breathing gas
    - Calculating maximum operating depth of a breathing gas
    - Calculating equivalent air depth of a breathing gas
  - Using Nitrox as a decompression gas
    - Planning accelerated decompression stops
  - Normoxic Trimix as a bottom gas
  - Hypoxic Trimix as a bottom gas
- Special interest knowledge and skills:
  - Cave diving techniques
  - Wreck penetration
  - Underwater photography
  - Underwater videography
  - Underwater archeology
  - Marine life identification
  - Marine biology
  - Underwater search and recovery skills
  - Selecting dive sites using nautical charts
  - Tides and use of tide tables
  - Weather influences and prediction
- Dive group leading skills:
  - Group diver rescue management techniques
  - Dive group safety, accident prevention and supervision
  - Underwater survey skills
- Logistical skills:
  - Boat handling and seamanship
  - Boat navigation and position fixing
  - Diving air compressor operation
  - Gas blending
  - Use of group equipment such as diving shots and decompression trapezes
  - Recompression chamber operation
- Instructor skills:
  - Teaching diving theory
  - Teaching personal diving skills
  - Teaching group diving, safety and rescue skills
  - Teaching boat handling, seamanship and navigation skills
  - Teaching instructing skills

== Scuba training for minors ==
Most training agencies have minimum ages for diving and often restrict younger children to snorkeling. BSAC allows 6-year-olds to train for the "Dolphin Snorkeller" grade.

From the age of 8 years old PADI has the "SEAL Team program" and SSI have "SCUBA Rangers" which teach diving in shallow swimming pools. PADI allows 10-year-olds to do the full Open Water Diver course. They are called "Junior Open Water" divers. There are restrictions on their depth and group size when diving. Also they must dive with their parents or a professional. When they reach the age of 12 they can dive with a qualified adult. Over 15 they are considered capable of diving with others of the same age or above.

BSAC allows 12-year-olds to do the full entry-level diving course - the Ocean Diver course. This qualification has no restrictions for the young diver, but individual branches of BSAC are free to set their own minimum age for branch membership.

The German Society for Pediatric Sports Medicine (Gesellschaft für Pädiatrische Sportmedizin]) has developed a consensus statement on the subject of children's diving by the 'Children's Diving' working group, which was presented to the public as the Eisenacher Erklärun at the International Boat Show in Düsseldorf in 2015. The major diving organizations in Germany, including international organizations, have agreed to this declaration. This 'Eisenach Statement' contains the essential rules of conduct when diving (dive training) with children.

== International standards equivalence ==
The International Organization for Standardization has approved recreational diving standards that may be implemented worldwide.

The listed standards developed by the (United States) RSTC are consistent with the applicable ISO Standards:

| (USA) RSTC Standard | ISO Standard | Alternative ISO Title |
|---|---|---|
| Introductory Scuba Experience | No equivalent | |
| No equivalent | Level One Diver | Supervised Diver |
| Open Water Diver | Level Two Diver | Autonomous Diver |
| Dive Supervisor | Level Three Diver | Dive Leader |
| Assistant Instructor | Level 1 Instructor | |
| Scuba Instructor | Level 2 Instructor | |
| Instructor Trainer | No equivalent | |
| No equivalent | Service Provider | |

=== ISO training standards ===
The ISO training standards are published by the International Organisation for Standards, and are minimum standards. These standards also generally have an equivalent EN standard designation. A diver training agency can follow the standard as long as all the requirements are met, and can add as much additional course material as they see fit. Gas density limits are specified for rebreather training, with a preferred value of 5.2g/L and a maximum of 6.3g/L. These limits also effectively address narcotic limits.

- ISO 11107 "Recreational diving services – Requirements for training programmes on enriched air nitrox (EAN) diving"
- ISO 11121 "Recreational diving services – Requirements for introductory training programmes to scuba diving"
- ISO 24801 "Recreational diving services — Requirements for the training of recreational scuba divers" (EN 14153)
  - "Part 1: Level 1 — Supervised diver (ISO 24801-1)"
  - "Part 2: Level 2 — Autonomous diver (ISO 24801-2)". ISO.
  - "Part 3: Level 3 — Dive leader (ISO 24801-3:2014)"
- ISO 24802 "Recreational Diving Services - Safety related minimum requirements for the training of scuba instructors" (EN 14413)
  - "Part 1: Level 1 scuba instructor"
  - "Part 2: Level 2 scuba instructor"
- ISO 24803 specifies performance requirements for the recreational diving service provider, also known as the "Dive Center" (EN 14467)
- ISO 24804 "Recreational Diving Services – Requirements for recreational rebreather diver training – No-decompression diving"
- ISO 24805 "Recreational Diving Services – Requirements for recreational rebreather diver training – Decompression diving to 45m"
- ISO 24806 "Recreational Diving Services – Requirements for recreational rebreather diver training – Decompression diving to 60m"
- ISO 24807 "Recreational Diving Services – Requirements for recreational rebreather diver training – Decompression diving to 100m"
  This does not limit divers to a maximum depth of 100m, but the training is not required to go below 100m.
- ISO 24808 "Recreational Diving Services – Requirements for recreational rebreather instructor training"
  There are four parts within this standard addressing the levels of instructor certification for training each of the diver levels.

== See also ==
- Diver training – Processes to develop the skills and knowledge to dive safely underwater
- List of diver certification organizations – Agencies which issue certification for competence in diving skills
- Scuba diving tourism – Industry based on recreational diver travel
- Professional diver training – Training of candidates for registration as professional divers
- Recreational scuba certification levels – Competence represented by recreational scuba certification
