= Recreational diver course referral =

System to complete recreational scuba training with another instructor

Recreational diver course referral is a system intended to facilitate completion of training for open water recreational scuba diving students who intend to do their training dives at a place different from the venue for the theory and confined water training. Referral systems within a specific training agency were the original format, but as more universally recognised training standard such as those of the recreational Scuba Training Council, and more recently the ISO and EUF standards have been adopted by most training agencies, it has become possible to expand the system to function across agencies. Referrals within a certification agency are relatively uncontroversial as the agency training standards are expected to be fairly uniform. Cross-agency referrals can occasionally raise problems where the standards differ significantly, as the instructor completing the training may not be entirely familiar with the relevant s requirements.

Equipment rental and where appropriate, boat dives may be included in the package. Not all diver training agencies, schools and instructors participate in inter-agency referrals.

== Universal Referral Program ==
The Universal Referral Program (URP) is a system intended to facilitate completion of training for open water recreational scuba diving students who intend to do their training dives at a place different from the venue for the theory and confined water training. More specifically, it allows inter agency referral - the referral instructor is not necessarily a member of the same certification agency as the initiating instructor.

The program was developed in 1998 by educators, risk managers and attorneys for the diver certification agencies International Diving Educators Association (IDEA), National Association of Scuba Diving Schools (NASDS), National Association of Underwater Instructors (NAUI), Professional Diving Instructors Corporation (PDIC), Scuba Schools International (SSI) and YMCA SCUBA Program based on industry training standards. The system established referral paperwork, procedures and a minimum list of skills to be performed. The URP enrollment procedures and instructor qualifications are managed by each training agency for their members. The referral instructor must review and verify that the candidate's medical history form has been completed, conduct the required open water skills exercises, and assess the diver on the specified diving skills, then complete the paperwork. If performance was satisfactory a temporary certification may be issued. The completed form is returned to the initiating instructor to issue the certification.

PADI instructors can also accept students for certification dives using the Universal Referral Program form, but cannot refer their learners to other certification agencies' instructors for branding and liability reasons.

=== Advantages ===
The advantages of referral are that the learner diver can complete the theory and confined water training near home, which should be more economical in time and cost, and there is a longer time available for learning the information, with less time pressure and vacation activity distraction, then get the open water training in a vacation environment, where the water conditions are likely to be more pleasant, and can be followed by further recreational dives. The hometown study environment is found to be more conducive to learning than the vacation environment, and referral students tend to have a better grasp of the theoretical side of the training. Completing the theory and pool training at the local dive shop saves on vacation time and allows the learner more time to practice and develop skills as the time pressure is reduced. They also have the opportunity to become involved in the local diving community.

=== Disadvantages ===
Disadvantages of the Referral Program are that there may be a delay between the initial part of the course and the open water dives. The time allowed varies from 6 months to a year, depending on the certification agency, and this is long enough to forget some skills and knowledge, so a refresher may be required. It is preferable to do both parts within a short period, and this may be logistically complicated, and the weather conditions may not be conducive to this schedule. The change between instructors may not be helpful, as they may differ in style and personality, and there may be small differences in technique which could cause confusion, but could also provide a better range of experience. It is also likely that rented equipment will be unfamiliar at the referral site, and may have significantly different buoyancy characteristics at the time in the diver's career when this can be most distracting and have the most influence on their ability to cope with change. An unfamiliar set of equipment should be tested in benign conditions where adjustments can be made in comfort and safety, which requires more time. There may also be an increased cost because of the split between two service providers, the additional paperwork and other overheads and sometimes the necessity to repeat training of forgotten skills. The cost may be unpredictable, and is likely to be more than for a continuous course with a single instructor. PADI does not allow referral to instructors from other agencies (unless they are also registered with PADI) for reasons of liability and branding. Their legal advisors consider that defending a lawsuit could be complicated by having different standards apply. However it is not usually difficult to find a PADI dive school in most areas, so this restriction is unlikely to affect the number of PADI certifications significantly, or make much difference to collected revenue.

The use of the term "checkout dives" to refer to the open water training dives in the referral component has been challenged as inappropriate, as they are an integral and essential part of diver training. There are aspects of training that cannot be emulated in a confined water environment, and suggesting that they can diminishes the perceived importance of these dives, which may reduce the attention given to them.

== PADI open water referral ==
A PADI open water diver course referral is a standard format document made out by a registered PADI instructor in good standing which authorises the named person to be complete the open water dives of their training by an instructor at any PADI dive centre within 12 months. The theory and confined water skills must have been satisfactorily completed under the referring instructor. This allows the learner diver to do a large part of the training conveniently near to home, and finish it on vacation in more desirable surroundings, and not waste vacation time on the classroom sessions and pool training. PADI schools and instructors can accept referrals through other agencies, but prices may vary, particularly if the number of open water dives required is different.

== SDI referrals ==
Scuba Diving International (SDI) have a global referral system for their Open Water Scuba Diving course since about 2002, which is valid for 6 months.
