= National Association of Underwater Instructors =

Non-profit training and certification agency association of scuba instructors

- Abbreviation: NAUI
- Formation: 1960
- Founded: 1959
- Type: NGO
- Legal status: 501(c)(6) association
- Purpose: diver training and certification
- Headquarters: 9030 Camden Field Parkway; Riverview, Florida; US
- Region served: Global
- Executive Director: Vacant
- Main organ: Board Of Directors
- Affiliations: United States RSTC
- Website: www.naui.org
- Formerly called: The National Diving Patrol

The National Association of Underwater Instructors (NAUI Worldwide) is a nonprofit association of scuba instructors founded in 1960 by Albert Tillman and Neal Hess.

NAUI primarily serves as a recreational dive certification and membership organization, providing international diver standards and education programs. NAUI is headquartered in Riverview, Florida near Tampa with dive and member instructors, resorts, stores, service and training centers located around the world.

== Certifications & leadership ==
It was officially CE and International Organization for Standardization (ISO) certified in May 2007 in all three diver levels and both instructor levels. It was re-certified for its scuba diving programs as meeting ISO and European Underwater Federation standards on November 24, 2015.

Agency standards, policies, and ethics are governed by the Association's Board of Directors, who are members themselves and who are each elected through a democratic election process by the overall instructor membership.

== History ==
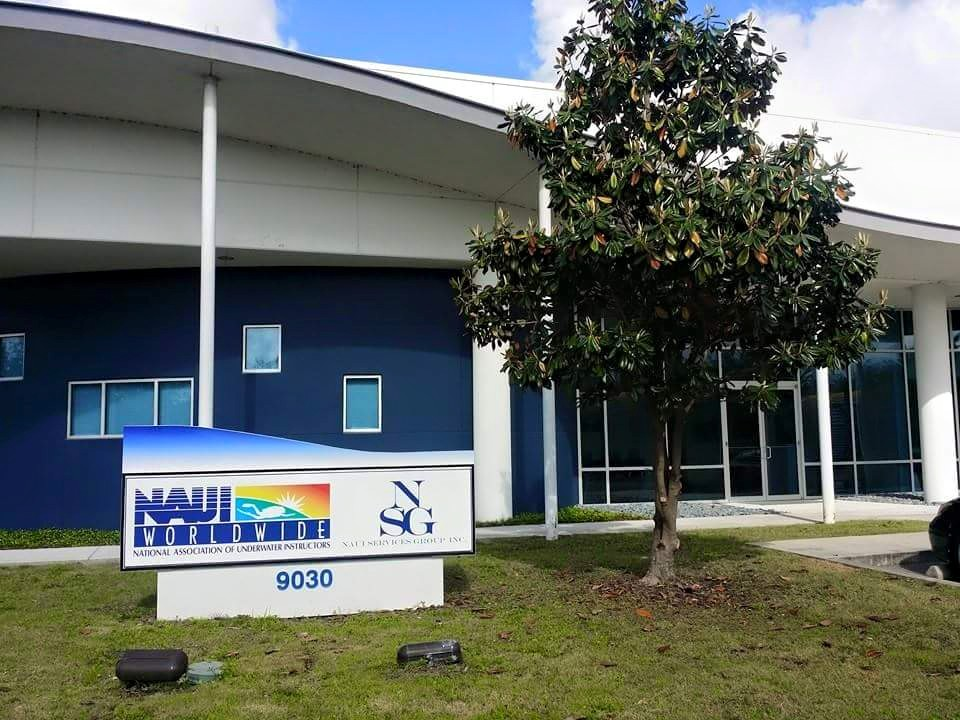
NAUI Worldwide Headquarters, located in Tampa, Florida

After Jacques-Yves Cousteau introduced the Aqua-Lung to the market, there followed a growing interest in scuba diving by the public and a subsequent need to codify the training.

In 1951, Jim Auxie Jr and Chuck Blakeslee started a magazine called The Skin Diver (later renamed Skin Diver Magazine). Two-year dive teacher Neal Earl Hess contributed to its "The Instructors Corner" column to inform readers about scuba. He soon established a column called "The National Diving Patrol" as a section to name new skin and scuba diving "instructors".

Still, no official training and certifying agency existed, except for the training and resources provided by the military (Underwater Demolition Teams) and dive clubs.

In 1952, Al Tillman, the director of sports for the Los Angeles County Department of Parks and Recreation, said in a letter to Parks and Recreation director Paul Gruendyke, "A new sport—skin diving—is becoming popular in the area. Recently while diving in Palos Verdes, I ran into several divers in the water with me who didn't know what they were doing. One had one of the new underwater breathing units that allows divers to stay under for long periods of time... I propose that my department get involved in this sport and provide training classes. I believe that diving will grow in the future and we have an obligation to make the sport as safe as possible."

In 1955, Tillman and L.A. County lifeguard Bev Morgan created the L.A. County Parks and Recreational Underwater Instructor Certification Course (1UICC) in an effort to respond to the growing number of diver requests. It was the world's first civilian training program to certify recreational divers and soon began granting Provisional Certification to instructors across the country.

In the May 1960 issue of Skin Diver Magazine, the creation of The National Diving Patrol was announced as an official, national organization. Its purpose and function was "to insure competent underwater instruction and to reduce diving accidents through education." In 1959, the name was changed to the National Association of Underwater Instructors (NAUI).

Hess, Blakeslee, Auxier, and Tillman met in August 1960 to discuss and organize NAUI's first Instructor Certification Course. It was held at the Shamrock Hotel in Houston, Texas on August 22–26. During the six-day course, 72 candidates attended from the U.S. and Canada, but only 53 graduated. The 53 graduates along with their staff instructors became the first instructor members of the National Association of Underwater Instructors. The NAUI ICC became the first course to make diver certification available worldwide.

A year later, the second NAUI ICC was held in Toronto, Ontario, Canada, under the direction of Ben Davis.

In October 1961, NAUI was incorporated in the State of California as a non-profit educational organization, with Al Tillman as the President and Neal Hess as the Executive Secretary.

NAUI's first elected Board of Directors included Al Tillman, John C. Jones Jr., Neal Hess, Garry Howland, Jim Auxier, and James Cahill. A Board of Advisers was appointed and included Captain Albert Behnke Jr., Commander George Bond, Captain Jacques-Yves Cousteau, and Dr. Andreas Rechnitzer.

The number of NAUI ICCs grew throughout the 1960s in central locations throughout North America. The association's conduct of business relied on volunteers and the board regional leaders, all administered out of Al Tillman's home. Skin Diver Magazine published the "NAUI Page" as a regular feature to help the organization grow, to accumulate a salary and, later, to provide office space.The first International Conference on Underwater Education was held in 1969 at Santa Ana College, where it served as a venue for NAUI members from all over could meet and exchange ideas. It was also used as a forum to present information on diving skills and safety, teaching, diving physiology, physics, and other diving and marine sciences.

The US Internal Revenue Service determined that NAUI be a tax-exempt nonprofit educational organization in 1971.

Soon, NAUI membership began to expand internationally, with an ICC being held in Japan in 1970 and NAUI Canada being organized as a separate corporation in 1972.

NAUI instructors certified more than 40,000 entry-level scuba divers in 1970 alone; 1979 was a year with over 5,000 newly certified NAUI scuba instructors. By the time 1989 came around, over 12,000 NAUI instructors were certified. NAUI Worldwide had established a network of 20 service centers in 1998.

From 1981 to 1997, NAUI headquarters facilities remained in Montclair, California. It was during these years (in 1987) that the NAUI Board of Directors elected its first woman president, Nancy Guarascio.

In 1997, NAUI Worldwide headquarters was moved to Tampa, Florida and included Board of Directors members from Europe and Asia for the first time.

NAUI hired Jim Bram as its president in June 1995. Bram renamed NAUI to do business as NAUI Worldwide, with the intent to provide business support to members everywhere via licensed service centers.

On January 20, 2015, the Ohio Board of Pharmacy amended Code 4729-21-06: Sales of medical oxygen to scuba divers. The code authorized individuals who completed courses from NAUI to purchase and possess medical oxygen for the purpose of emergency care or treatment at the scene of a diving emergency.

In November 2015, NAUI released a series of announcements during the 2015 DEMA Show in Orlando, Florida. Its first podcast series, the "Dive Team Report", released once per week. The podcast was designed to inform the general public and divers on trends and issues affecting the sport of diving. The first full episode aired on November 12, 2015.

A series of other announcements included its new marketing campaign "The Definition of Diving", its demo version of its new website interface (version 1.0), and its alliance with the Divers Alert Network and Performance Freediving International. For the first time, NAUI and DAN came together to offer DAN's first-aid programs to NAUI divers and members. NAUI established and incorporated the co-branded DAN-NAUI first-aid courses into their curricula.

=== NAUI Green Diver Initiative ===
In 2010, NAUI Worldwide formed the NAUI Green Diver Initiative (GDI). GDI was implemented to "empower individuals to preserve and conserve the ocean planet with the common goal of taking action to protect the environment." With stagnant progress, it was not until July 2015 that NAUI renewed its commitment to the Initiative, unveiling its first manager, Sam Richardson, who entered the full-time position with over 10 years of non-profit experience. GDI remained a U.S. registered 501 (c) (3) non-profit that relied on the support of donors to fulfill its mission.

== Honorary NAUI members recognitions ==
In the United States, US Navy SEALs, Coast Guard rescue divers, and other special military forces are trained to NAUI standards as part of their overall training with open and closed circuit rebreathers; National Park Service and NOAA divers receive NAUI training and certifications.

Aqualung inventor Captain Jacques-Yves Cousteau was on the original Board of Advisers of NAUI, as was Albert R. Behnke, a pioneer of diving medicine.

Actor Lloyd Bridges was the first honorary NAUI instructor member. He played frogman "Mike Nelson" in the American television series Sea Hunt, which popularized scuba diving as a recreational sport. Zale Parry played the female role, and she formally instructed Lloyd Bridges on how to dive for the part. She was a research diver starring in the television's first underwater documentary series, Kingdom of the Sea, in 1954. She made a record-setting 209-foot dive that same year, distinguishing women as skilled divers.

=== Corporate alliances ===
NAUI has numerous corporate alliances with organizations, such as Walt Disney World Resort, The Florida Aquarium, NASA's Neutral Buoyancy Laboratory, and the Fire Department of New York. Many of the first generation of diving safety officers of the top universities, colleges and institutes of technology in the United States were NAUI members and made significant contributions to NAUI's programs, including: Lee Somers University of Michigan, James Stewart Scripps Institution of Oceanography, Richard Bell University of California, Davis, Henry Viex United States Military Academy, Lloyd Austin University of California, Berkeley, Mark Flahan California State University, San Diego, Phillip Sharkey University of Rhode Island, Ronnie D'Amico California State University, Long Beach, Walt Hendricks, Sr. University of Puerto Rico, Glen Egstrom University of California, Los Angeles, and John Heine Moss Landing Marine Laboratories.

These institutions, and others, belong to the American Academy of Underwater Sciences, and while their training programs greatly exceed minimum NAUI requirements, certifications in their scientific diving training programs are often arranged through NAUI. Many governmental agencies in the United States do the same, including the US Navy SEALs, Army Special Forces, and NASA.

== Courses ==
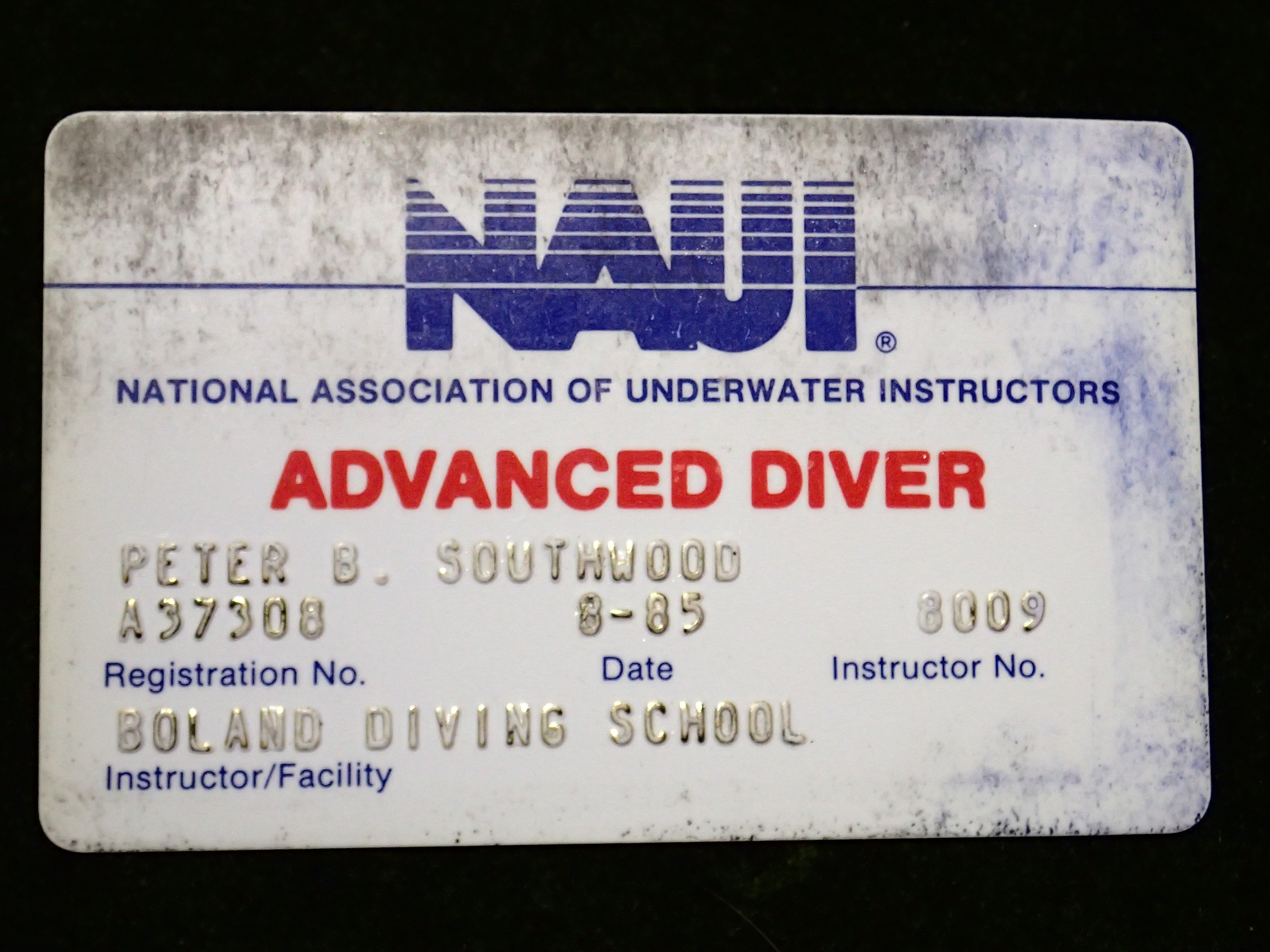
NAUI Advanced Diver certification card from 1985

NAUI produced a Scuba Diver Education System in 2000, and it began including its education systems to all mainline certification courses, listed below.

=== Recreational courses ===
- Junior Skindiver
- Junior Scuba Diver
- Junior Advanced Scuba Diver
- Skin Diver
- Scuba Diver
- Experienced Scuba Diver
- Advanced Scuba Diver
- Master Scuba Diver

=== Specialty courses ===
- Deep Diver
- Dry Suit Diver
- Enriched Air Nitrox (EAN) Diver
- Scuba Rescue Diver
- Search and Recovery Diver
- Training Assistant
- Underwater Archaeologist
- Underwater Ecologist
- Underwater Environment
- Underwater Photographer
- Underwater Hunter and Collector
- Wreck Diver (External Survey)

=== Leadership courses ===
- Assistant Instructor
- Skin Diving Instructor
- Divemaster
- Instructor Preparation Course
- Instructor
- Instructor Trainer
- Course Director

=== Technical courses ===
- Cave Diver (Levels I, II, and III)
- Cavern Diver
- CCR Mixed Gas Diver
- Closed Circuit Rebreather Diver
- Decompression Technique
- Heliair Diver
- Helitrox Diver
- Ice Diver
- Introduction to Technical Diving
- Mixed Gas Blender and O2 Service Technician
- Semi-closed Rebreather Diver
- Technical Nitrox Diver
- Technical Support Leader
- Technical Wreck Penetration Diver
- Tri-Mix Diver (Levels I & II)
- Wreck Penetration Diver

=== NAUI programs ===
==== Insurance programs ====
NAUI is allied with Divers Alert Network, a non-profit organization for diver's assistance and medical research on recreational scuba diving safety, developed by Executive Director Dan Orr in 1980. DAN and NAUI allied in 2007 to work together for diver safety. DAN is the official dive accident insurance provider for NAUI. In November 2015, DAN and NAUI renewed their alliance to extend their reach of dive safety programs.

NAUI initiated a worldwide coverage instructor liability insurance policy in 1974. This worldwide policy allowed members of the Bahamas, British Virgin Islands and other islands of the Caribbean, and military personnel stationed in various areas around the world to receive worldwide coverage.

==== First aid programs ====
NAUI's rescue certification course was first proposed and made available to members in 1981 to provide an alternative to the Red Cross training, which was previously required for leadership candidates in NAUI courses. It was created by the NAUI Board of Directors to avoid making NAUI programs dependent upon other agency certifications.

== NAUI technical diving professional certifications ==
NAUI sanctioned nitrox training in 1992 and published standards for teaching technical diving in 1997.

Technical diving includes methods that exceed the limits imposed on depth or immersion time for traditional recreational diving. It often involves the use of special gas mixtures (rather than compressed air) for breathing. NAUI standards for technical diving were developed by Tim O'Leary and published by NAUI Worldwide in 1997. NAUI's technical diving program requires special training, equipment, and qualified support teams.

In 1997, the NAUI Technical Diving Division was created. NAUI formed a Technical Training Advisory Board and Rebreather Advisory Board, with Tim O'Leary as the chairman for each, to assist in the development of technical diving standards and training.

=== NAUI decompression algorithms and tables ===
The reduced gradient bubble model is an iterative approach to staging diver ascents. It employs a dual phase approach with separated phase volumes as limit points, along with critical tensions across tissue compartments. It was developed by Dr. Bruce Wienke in 1988 at Los Alamos National Laboratories. He published the model in 1992. The algorithm is now incorporated into many dive computers and advanced dive planning software. Today it enhances the safety of serious deep and technical divers.

NAUI's RGBM decompression tables were developed in 1997 exclusively for NAUI by Dr. Bruce Wienke and Tim O'Leary. NAUI began publishing the only decompression manual with a full set of RGBM tables in 2000 for air, nitrox and trimix for both open and closed-circuit diving. Recreational RGBM no-calculation tables were published in 2001 exclusively for NAUI for sea level through 10,000 feet, no-stop diving.

== Accreditation and affiliations ==
The Chinese Underwater Association (CUA), in conjunction with the China Water Sports Administration (CWSA), officially legitimized NAUI to provide translated diver training materials and diver training in the People's Republic of China.

The Malaysian Sport Diving Association (MSDA) officially adopted NAUI standards for use in their diver training in Malaysia.

NAUI is the diver training organization of choice of NASA's Neutral Buoyancy Laboratory at the Johnson Space Center in Houston, Texas (USA). NAUI's alliance with the Neutral Buoyancy Laboratory provides training materials, certification cards and collateral materials for their scuba program.

NAUI is a member of the Universal Referral Program (URP), a worldwide customer service program that allows instructors to refer their students for certification dives with either NAUI or other diver training agencies. The URP was developed in 1998 through the cooperative efforts of IDEA, NASDS, NAUI, PDIC, SSI, and YMCA. PADI Instructors and facilities can also receive students and be registered as referral instructors and locations under the URP.

== See also ==
- Scuba diving – Swimming underwater, breathing gas carried by the diver
- List of diver certification organizations – Agencies which issue certification for competence in diving skills
- Recreational diver training – Training process for people who do not dive at work
