= Association nationale des moniteurs de plongée =

French recreational diver training and certification agency

- Abbreviation: ANMP
- Type: NGO
- Purpose: Underwater Sports and recreational diver training
- Headquarters: France
- Region served: France
- Official language: French
- Affiliations: CEDIP, UNSA
- Website: http://www.anmp-plongee.com

The Association nationale des moniteurs de plongée (English: National Association of Diving Instructors) ( ANMP ) is a French professional body recognized by the Ministry of Sports. It is empowered to grant certification to recreational divers in France.

ANMP is a founding member of CEDIP (European Committee of Professional Diving Instructors) and a union member of the National Union of Autonomous Unions (UNSA).

ANMP instructors are state certified instructors.

== Courses ==
Various types of training are offered by ANMP, through three separate courses:

- Scuba diving: accessible to all from age 12 years;
- Junior diving: the Junior diver programme allows the child to progress at their own pace regardless of their age;
- Mixed gas diving: ANMP created their own progression: through nitrox, advanced nitrox, basic trimix, trimix and rebreather.

ANMP also offers seven specialties leading to certification: Snorkeling, underwater life (biology), Night diving, Underwater Photo-Video, wreck or cave penetration, dry suit, and ice diving.

Since the reform of the Code of Sport in 2010, along with certification levels 1 to 4, ANMP offers 8 qualifications for diving skills for depths up to 12, 20, 40 and 60 meters.

These qualifications allow divers access to greater depths accompanied by an instructor if they are not interested in qualifying for autonomous diving to these depths, or to progress more rapidly to autonomous diving without necessarily being trained and experienced to the deepest dives.

== "Guide to the Sea" ==
The title of "Guide to the Sea", created by Daniel Mercier, founder president of the ANMP, recognizes knowledge and experience of members with particular reference to.

- the quality of care for customers,
- respect for the underwater environment,
- all aspects relating to health and safety
- maintaining their professional skills.

== Sources ==
Original translation of article in French based on La Charte du Guide de la mer de l'ANMP
