= Rebreather Association of International Divers =

Recreational diver training and certification agency

Dive RAID International
- Abbreviation: RAID
- Formation: 2007
- Location: Poole, England
- Region served: International
- COO: Sabatino Bianco
- Affiliations: US RSTC; Rebreather Training Council
- Website: https://www.diveraid.com/

Dive RAID International (formerly RAID) is a dive training organization which was founded in 2007 to support diver training for the Poseidon Mk VI Discovery Rebreather. It has since extended its scope to include open circuit scuba training and training for both recreational and technical diving sectors as well as snorkeling and freediving.

== History ==
RAID was founded in 2007 by Barry and Celia Coleman to support diver training required for the Poseidon Mk VI Discovery Rebreather. RAID first developed training for rebreathers, they have since extended their programmes to include open circuit courses at both the recreational and technical levels. RAID offers a complete range of online diver academic programs from beginner to instructor examiner levels in snorkeling, scuba and freediving.

Barry Coleman sold shares to Jim Holiday and Paul V. Toomer in 2014. Jim Holiday was CEO / President until 2018. During this time RAID experienced exceptional growth. Paul V. Toomer, previously Director of Technical Training for Scuba Schools International, was appointed as Director of Diver Training for RAID in 2014, and President in 2019.

In June 2016 RAID joined the United States Recreational Scuba Training Council as the first associate member. July 2016 they partnered with the Dive Pirates Foundation to bring adaptive scuba to more dive centers. Adaptive training is a system for adapting the skills training procedures to a better fit for the individual disabled but otherwise medically fit diver's personal requirements and abilities. The same theory, and skills training and assessment is used as for other divers.

In October 2017, RAID obtained European Underwater Federation certification. In April 2018 RAID was purchased by Kalkomey Enterprises, LLC to expand their range of outdoor courses.

In January 2022, RAID was purchased by Dive RAID International, a group of dive industry professionals. This group has broadened the RAID brand to focus more on the recreational/sport diving aspects of scuba. The agency is also active in the freediving and public safety diving training markets.

== Recognition ==
RAID is a member of:

- the United States Recreational Scuba Training Council (RSTC).
- the Rebreather Training Council.

RAID obtained CEN and ISO certification from the EUF certification body in October 2017 for the following certifications:

- ISO 24801-2 - RAID Open Water 20
- ISO 24801-3 - RAID Dive Master
- ISO 24802-2 - RAID Open Circuit Instructor
- ISO 11107 - RAID Nitrox Speciality
- ISO 11121 - RAID Try Open Circuit Diving
- ISO 13293 - RAID O2 Service and Gas Blender

Certification issued by RAID is approved by the UK Health and Safety Executive for divers whose duties are described in regulations 10, 12, and 13 of the Diving at Work Regulations 1997.

== Training system ==
RAID has a comprehensive online training system. RAID has over 60 programs online. Their no classroom approach covers their entire spectrum of training from snorkeling to rebreather diving. Delivering theory training online with no paper, no book and no plastic has allowed them to claim they have zero environmental impact. Once a course is passed the learner has lifetime access to that material. However, if a course is not completed in 6 months the learner will have to re-register. Academic material and certification are linked to the registration so, each student must register for their own class. Classes are available via an app on mobile device for both Android and IOS.

=== Certifications ===
==== Recreational Diving Courses ====
- Try Scuba Diving
- Junior Scuba Diver (Ages 12 to 14)
- Junior Open Water Diver (Ages 12 to 14)
- Scuba Diver
- Open Water 20
- Independent Diver
- Explorer 30
- Advanced 35
- Master Rescue Diver

===== Professional Recreational Courses =====
- Divemaster
- Open Water Scuba Instructor
- Open Circuit Try Dive Instructor
- Master Instructor

==== Rebreather Courses ====
- Try Rebreather
- Rebreather Level 1 Open Water: Basic no-decompression training in diving with rebreathers for non-divers and open circuit divers to 20 metres.
- Level 2
- Level 3
- Level 4
- Specialty Rebreather

===== Professional Rebreather Courses =====
- Sport Rebreather Instructor: Instructor training to teach no-decompression diving on RAID approved rebreathers or open circuit to depths not exceeding 40 metres.

==== Technical Diving Courses ====
RAID Technical programmes develop the diver to dive beyond recreational limits and incur decompression obligations.

Open Circuit Tech Scuba Courses

- OC Deco 40M/132 ft
- OC Deco 50M/164 ft

Professional Open Circuit Tech Courses

- OC Inst. Deco 50M/164 ft

Closed Circuit Rebreather Tech Courses

- RB Deco 40M/132 ft
- RB Deco 50M/164 ft
- RB Deco 60M/197 ft

===== Professional Closed Circuit Tech Courses =====
- RB Inst. Deco 50M/164 ft
- RB Inst. Deco 60M/197 ft

==== Freediving Courses ====
- WSF Basic Freediver
- WSF Freediver
- WSF Advanced Freediver
- WSF Master Freediver
- WSF Surf Survival

== See also ==
- Scuba diving – Swimming underwater, breathing gas carried by the diver
- List of diver certification organizations – Agencies which issue certification for competence in diving skills
- Rebreather diving – Underwater diving using self contained breathing gas recycling apparatus
- Recreational diver training – Training process for people who do not dive at work
