= International Diving Educators Association =

Recreational scuba training and certification agency

- Abbreviation: IDEA
- Formation: 1952
- Type: NGO
- Purpose: Scuba Instructor training and recreational diving certification
- Location: 4604 49th Street North Ste 202 St. Petersburg, Fl 33709
- Region served: Americas, Asia and Europe
- CEO: Rick Butler
- Affiliations: RSTC Europe; Diving Equipment and Marketing Association
- Formerly called: Florida Skin Divers Association (FSDA) Scuba Training Committee

The International Diving Educators Association (IDEA) is an American diving training organization that was originally established in 1952 as part of the Florida Skin Divers Association (FSDA).

In the early days, Scuba Instructor training and certification was handled by the FSDA Scuba Training Committee which was also in charge of Standards & Procedures and new diver certifications. By 1976 there were more FSDA instructors outside of Florida than within the state.

In February 1976, the membership voted to expand the Scuba Training Committee to an international certification agency. The name was changed to the International Diving Educators Association (IDEA). In 1979, IDEA was reorganized and incorporated. IDEA made its first international appearance as a member of the Diving Equipment Manufacturers Association (DEMA) in Las Vegas in 1980. IDEA grew into over 30 foreign countries and across the continental United States. In 1996 IDEA became the fourth largest certification agency worldwide.

IDEA is American owned and operated by US military veterans and first responders. In 1987 the majority of certification agencies agreed to form a not-for-profit agency known as the Recreational Scuba Training Council (RSTC). The purpose of the RSTC is to allow member associations a vehicle for developing standards and to monitor quality control for the mutual benefit of the recreational diving industry and the general public.

IDEA, along with the other members of the RSTC, developed the standards for the Entry Level Scuba standards registered and approved by ANSI. IDEA has affiliates operating in Asia and Europe.

IDEA Europe is a member of RSTC Europe.
