= International Diving Schools Association =

Organisation to develop common standards for commercial diver training

International Diving Schools Association (IDSA) was formed in 1982 with the primary purpose of developing common international standards for commercial diver training.

The Association is concerned with offshore, inshore and inland commercial diving and some specialist non-diving qualifications such as diving supervisors, diving medical technicians and life support technicians. It has published international diver training standards based on the consensus of members which provide a basic standard of comparison for commercial diver training standards, with the stated intention of:

- Improving safety
- Providing contractors with a direct input to the diver training syllabus
- Enabling contractors to bid across national borders on a more even playing field
- Improving diver quality
- Providing divers with greater job opportunities

== Aim ==
To improve quality and safety in the international diving industry by standardizing training and sharing knowledge and best practices.

IDSA is providing a qualification card called the IDSA Qcard. The IDSA Qcard is for divers that has been trained in IDSA Full Member Schools, the school can ask the IDSA office to make the Qcard (in creditcard format). Contrators can check on the website the validity of the IDSA Qcard. All IDSA Full members has to pass the IDSA Audit. IDSA provides a Table of Equivalence of various national commercial diver training standards.

IDSA standards are recognized in the Danish, Norwegian and Italian (Sicily) legislation.
