= Technical diving =

Diving beyond the scope of recreational diving

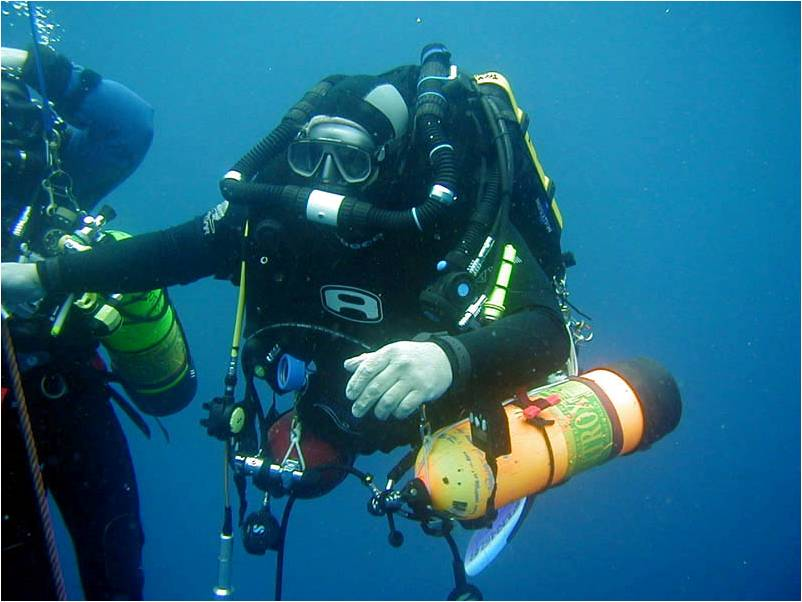
Diver Trevor Jackson returning from a 178 m (584 ft) wreck dive

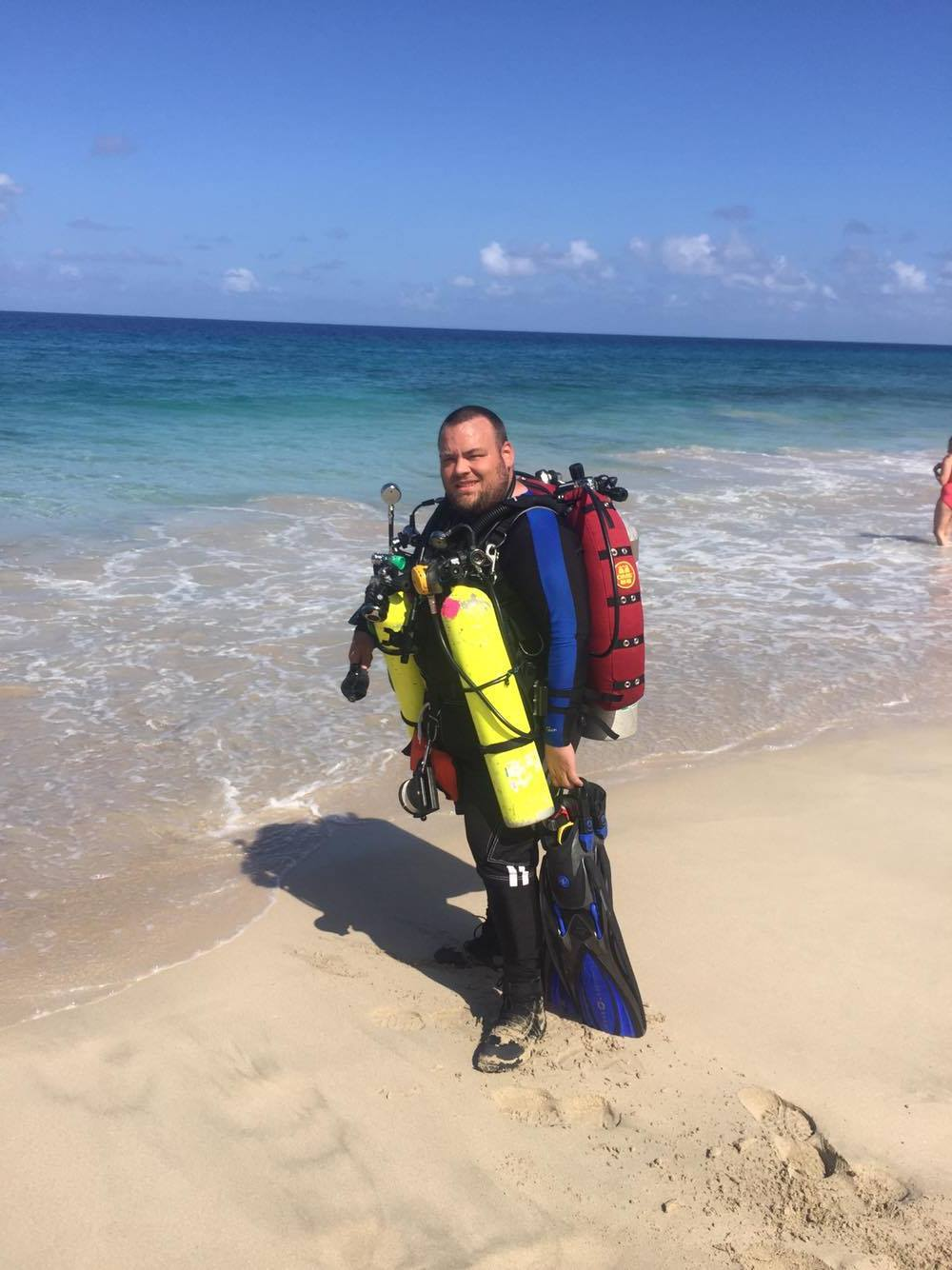
Diver equipped for decompression dive

Technical diving (also referred to as tec diving or tech diving) is scuba diving that exceeds the agency-specified limits of recreational diving for non-professional purposes. Technical diving may expose the diver to hazards beyond those normally associated with recreational diving, and to a greater risk of serious injury or death. Risk may be reduced by using suitable equipment and procedures, which require appropriate knowledge and skills. The required knowledge and skills are preferably developed through specialised training, adequate practice, and experience. The equipment involves breathing gases other than air or standard nitrox mixtures, and multiple gas sources.

Most technical diving is done within the limits of training and previous experience, but by its nature, technical diving includes diving which pushes the boundaries of recognised safe practice, and new equipment and procedures are developed and honed by technical divers in the field. Where these divers are sufficiently knowledgeable, skilled, prepared and lucky, they survive and eventually their experience is integrated into the body of recognised practice.

== Origin ==
The popular use of the term technical diving can be traced back to the cover story of the first issue of aquaCorps magazine (1990–1996), in early 1990, titled Call it "High-Tech" Diving by Bill Hamilton, describing the current state of recreational diving beyond the generally accepted limits, such as deep, decompression and mixed gas diving. By mid-1991, the magazine was using the term technical diving, as an analogy to the established term technical (rock) climbing.

More recently, recognizing that the term was already in use by the Royal Navy for rebreather diving, Hamilton redefined technical diving as diving with more than one breathing gas or with a rebreather. Richard Pyle (1999) defined a technical diver as "anyone who routinely conducts dives with staged stops during an ascent as suggested by a given decompression algorithm".

The term technical diving was also used in the US as far back as 1977 by the California Advisory Committee on Scientific and Technical Diving (CACSTD), to distinguish more complex modes of recreational diving from scientific diving for regulatory purposes. In the US the Occupational Safety and Health Administration categorises diving which is not occupational as recreational diving for purposes of exemption from regulation. This is also the case in some other countries, including South Africa. The use of the term technical diving by the CACSTD appears to refer to dives done for technical support of scientific work by occupational divers, and is no longer used for this meaning.

Technical diving emerged between the mid-1980s and the mid-to-late-1990s, and much of the history of its development was recorded in aquaCorps, started by Michael Menduno to provide a forum for these aspects of diving that most recreational diving magazines of the time refused to cover.

At the time, amateur scuba divers were exploring the physiological limits of diving using air. Technical divers looked for ways to extend the limits of air dives, and for ways to extend breathing gas supplies as they went deeper and stayed down longer. The military and commercial diving communities had large budgets, extensive infrastructure, and controlled diving operations, but the amateur diving community had a more trial-and-error approach to the use of mixed gas and rebreathers. Consequently, a relatively large number of fatal incidents occurred during the early years, before a reasonably reliable set of operating procedures and standards began to emerge, making the movement somewhat controversial, both within the mainstream diving establishment and between sectors of the technical diving community.

While the motivation to extend the depth and duration range by military and commercial divers was mainly driven by operational needs to get the job done, the motivation to exceed recreational diving depths and endurance ranges was more driven by the urge to explore otherwise inaccessible places, which could not at the time be reached by any other means.

There are places that no one has been to since the dawn of time. We can’t see what’s there.

We can see what’s on the dark side of the moon or what’s on Mars, but you can’t see what’s in the back of a cave unless you go there.

Sheck Exley, Exley on Mix, aquaCorps #4, Jan 1992

The urge to go where no one has gone before has always been a driving force for explorers, and the 1980s was a time of intense exploration by the cave-diving community, some of whom were doing relatively long air dives in the 60–125 m depth range, and doing decompression on oxygen. The details of many of these dives were not disclosed by the divers as these dives were considered experimental and dangerous. The divers who conducted these dives did not consider them suitable for the ordinary person, but necessary to extend the frontiers of exploration, and there were no consensus guidelines for scuba diving beyond 40 m.

== Definition ==
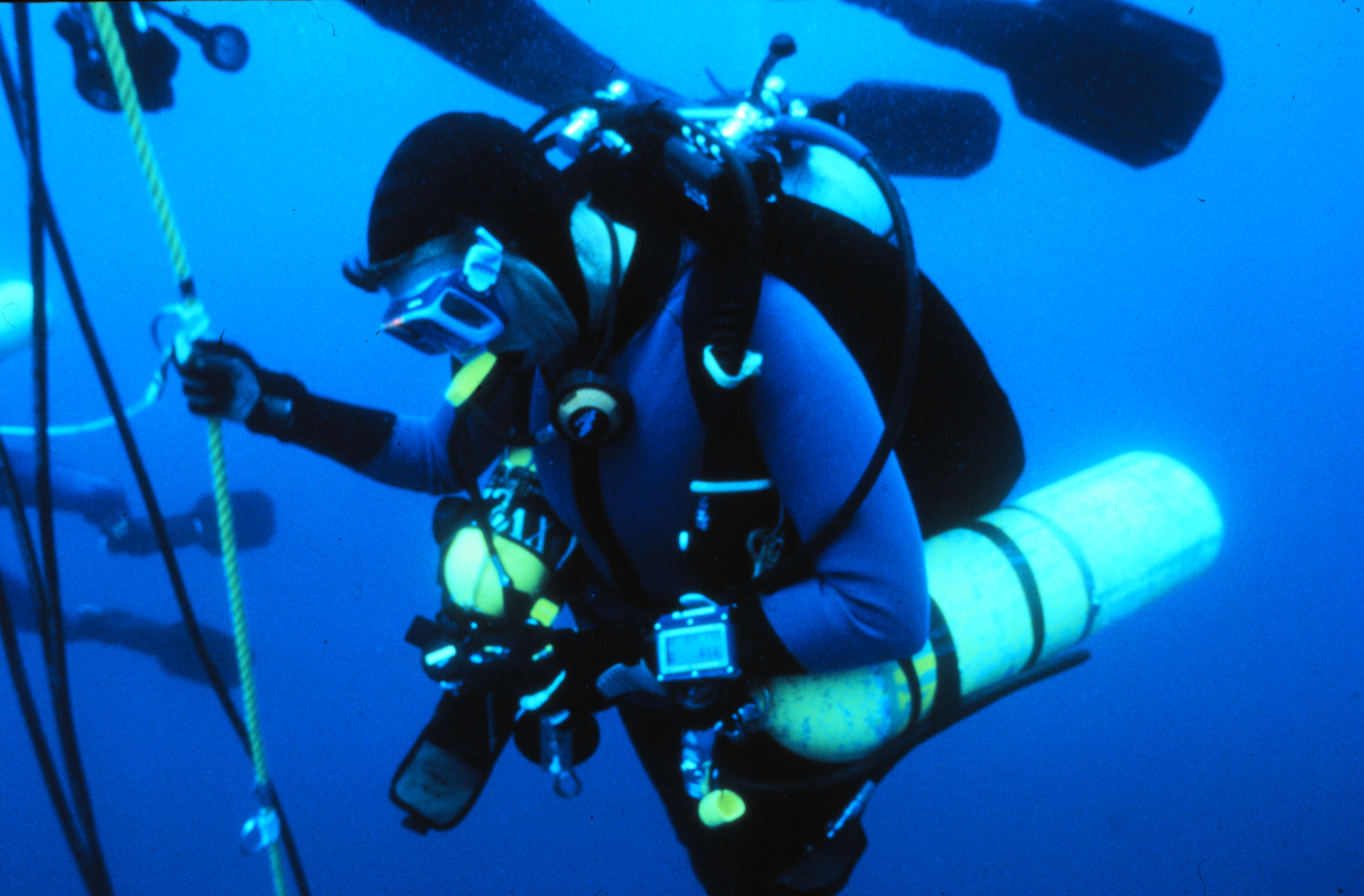
Technical diver during a decompression stop

There is no clear consensus on the definition of technical diving. It is an arbitrary distinction, and the line has been drawn in different places by different organisations, and has shifted on a few occasions. Nitrox diving, rebreather diving and sidemount diving were originally considered technical, but this is no longer the case and most certification agencies now offer these as recreational courses. Some training agencies classify penetration diving in wrecks and caves as technical diving. Even those who agree on the broad definitions of technical diving may disagree on the precise boundaries between technical and recreational diving:

- The International Association of Nitrox and Technical Divers (IANTD) has proposed: "Technical diving is a range of knowledge, skills and suitable equipment, which when combined correctly, allow recreational divers to increase their safety while underwater. This information (sic) may be employed in either shallow or deep water, may be used to safely extend the divers submerged duration well into the realms of extended decompressions and is often used as a tool for exploration." in their Exploration and Mixed Gas Diving Encyclopedia
- The National Association of Underwater Instructors (NAUI) defines technical diving as: "Technical diving is a form of scuba diving that exceeds the typical recreational limits imposed on depth and immersion time (bottom time). Tec diving involves accelerated decompression and/or the use of variable gas mixtures during a dive."
- The National Oceanic and Atmospheric Administration (NOAA) defines technical diving as: "all diving methods that exceed the limits imposed on depth and/or immersion time for recreational scuba diving. Technical diving often involves the use of special gas mixtures (other than compressed air) for breathing. The type of gas mixture used is determined either by the maximum depth planned for the dive, or by the length of time that the diver intends to spend underwater. While the recommended maximum depth for conventional scuba diving is 40 metres (130 ft), technical divers may work in the range of 50 metres (160 ft) to 100 metres (330 ft), sometimes even deeper. Technical diving almost always requires one or more mandatory decompression 'stops' upon ascent, during which the diver may change breathing gas mixes at least once." NOAA does not address issues relating to overhead environments or specify the recreational diving limits in its definition, and the use of single mixture nitrox is well established in mainstream recreational diving.
- The Professional Association of Diving Instructors (PADI) defines technical diving as: "diving other than conventional commercial or recreational diving that takes divers beyond the recreational diving limits of 40 metres/130 feet. It is further defined as an activity that includes one or more of the following: diving beyond 40 metres/130 feet, required stage decompression, diving in an overhead environment beyond 130 linear feet from the surface, accelerated stage decompression and/or the use of multiple gas mixtures in a single dive."
- Technical Diving International (TDI) defines a technical diving as: any dive involving decompression, additional cylinders, alternative breathing gases, rebreathers, or overhead environments such as wrecks, caves or mines. This definition does not make a strong distinction between “recreational” and “technical” as both styles of diving are recreational and require similar equipment.
- The Queensland government, Australia, defines recreational technical diving as: recreational diving using nitrox or other mixed gas, or any diving requiring decompression.
- The British Sub-Aqua Club (BSAC) defines technical diving as: any diving that involves specialist equipment such as closed circuit rebreathers (CCR), using multiple gas mixes on open circuit, or that uses helium-based gas mixtures termed mixed gas.varies from many agencies in including some staged decompression within recreational diving.

Other European diving agencies tend to consider technical diving as dives deeper than 50 metres (160 ft) and many, as noted for BSAC above, teach staged decompression diving as an integral part of recreational training, rather than as a fundamental change of scope. The Bühlmann tables used by the Sub-Aqua Association (SAA) and other European agencies make staged decompression dives available, and the SAA teaches modest staged decompression as part of its advanced training programme.

=== Scope ===
The following table gives an overview of the activities that various agencies suggest to differentiate between technical and recreational diving:

Differences between recreational and technical diving
Activity	Recreational	Technical
Deep diving	Maximum depth of 40 metres (130 ft) or 50 metres (160 ft) (Note: Some recreational diving agencies recommend diving no deeper than 30 metres (100 ft), and suggest an absolute limit of 40 metres (130 ft). This has changed over time, and the PADI Deep Diver certification changed from 18 to 30 m max, to 18 to 40 m.)	Beyond 40 metres (130 ft) or 50 metres (160 ft)
Decompression diving (Note: There is a reasonable body of professional opinion that considers decompression diving to be the sole differentiator for "technical" diving, but another body of professional opinion that considers all dives to be decompression dives. The distinction is between dives for which there is no obligatory decompression stop, and dives for which the decompression planning system (dive computer or schedule) indicates a requirement for a decompression stop. The same dive profile may or may not require a stop, depending on the system used to monitor the profile and the algorithm chosen to model decompression requirements.)	Some agencies define recreational diving as "No decompression" diving; others consider all dives to be decompression dives.	Some agencies define technical diving as "Decompression diving"; others consider all dives to be decompression dives.
Mixed gas diving	Air and nitrox	Nitrox, trimix, heliox and heliair.
Gas switching	Single gas used	May switch between gases to accelerate decompression and/or "travel mixes" to permit descent carrying hypoxic gas mixes
Rebreather diving	Some agencies regard use of semi-closed rebreathers as recreational diving;	PADI TecRec, TDI, GUE, IANTD, SSI XR, IART, ISE, NAUI TEC, PSAI, UTD regard as technical diving.
Wreck diving	Penetration limited to "light zone" or 30 metres (100 ft) depth + penetration	Deeper penetration
Cave diving	Penetration limited to "light zone" or 30 metres (100 ft) depth + penetration (Note: Some certification agencies prefer to the term "cavern diving" to cave penetration within recreational diving limits.)	Deeper penetration, may involve complex navigation and decompression
Ice diving	Some recreational agencies regard ice diving as recreational diving	Others regard it as technical diving.
Error Handling	Training emphasises safely returning to the surface as the basic response to problems during a dive. (eg disorientation, lost dive buddy, low air or approaching "no deco" limits)	Training emphasises discipline, redundancy and contingency plans to prevent or manage problems when a prompt return to the surface is unsafe or impossible.

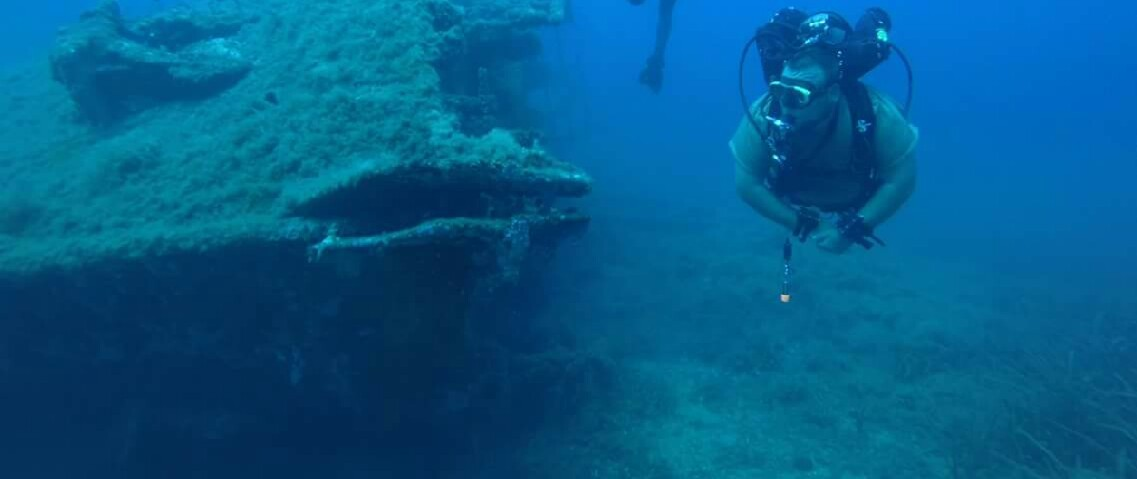
An example of wreck diving; A technical diver diving the Nasello wreck in Sardinia at 34m depth.

== Hazards and risk ==
One of the perceived differences between technical and other forms of recreational diving is the associated hazards, of which there are more associated with technical diving, and risk, which is often, but not always greater in technical diving. Hazards are the circumstances that may cause harm, and risk is the likelihood of the harm actually occurring. The hazards are partly due to the extended scope of technical diving, and partly associated with the equipment used. In some cases, the equipment used presents a secondary risk while mitigating a primary risk, such as the complexity of gas management needed to reduce the risk of a fatal gas supply failure, or the use of gases potentially unbreathable for some parts of a dive profile to reduce the risk of harm caused by oxygen toxicity, nitrogen narcosis or decompression sickness for the whole operation. Reduction of secondary risks may also affect equipment choice, but is largely skill-based. Training of technical divers includes procedures that are known from experience to be effective in handling the most common contingencies. Divers proficient in these emergency drills are less likely to be overwhelmed by the circumstances when things do not go according to plan, and are less likely to panic.

=== Depth ===
Technical dives may be defined as being dives deeper than about 130 feet (40 m) or dives in an overhead environment with no direct access to the surface or natural light. Such environments may include fresh and saltwater caves and the interiors of shipwrecks. In many cases, technical dives also include planned decompression carried out over a number of stages during a controlled ascent to the surface at the end of the dive. The depth-based definition is based on risk caused by the progressive impairment of mental competence with the increasing partial pressure of respired nitrogen. Breathing air under pressure causes nitrogen narcosis that usually starts to become a problem at depths of 100 feet (30 m) or greater, but this differs between divers. Increased depth also increases the partial pressure of oxygen and so increases the risk of oxygen toxicity. Technical diving often includes the use of breathing mixtures other than air to reduce these risks, and the additional complexity of managing a variety of breathing mixtures introduces other risks and is managed by equipment configuration and procedural training. To reduce nitrogen narcosis, it is common to use trimix which uses helium to replace some of the nitrogen in the diver's breathing mixture, or heliox, in which there is no nitrogen.

=== Inability to ascend directly ===
Technical dives may alternatively be defined as dives where the diver cannot safely ascend directly to the surface either due to a mandatory decompression stop or a physical ceiling. This form of diving implies a much greater reliance on the redundancy of critical life support equipment and procedural training since the diver must stay underwater until it is safe to ascend or the diver has successfully exited the overhead environment.

==== Decompression stops ====
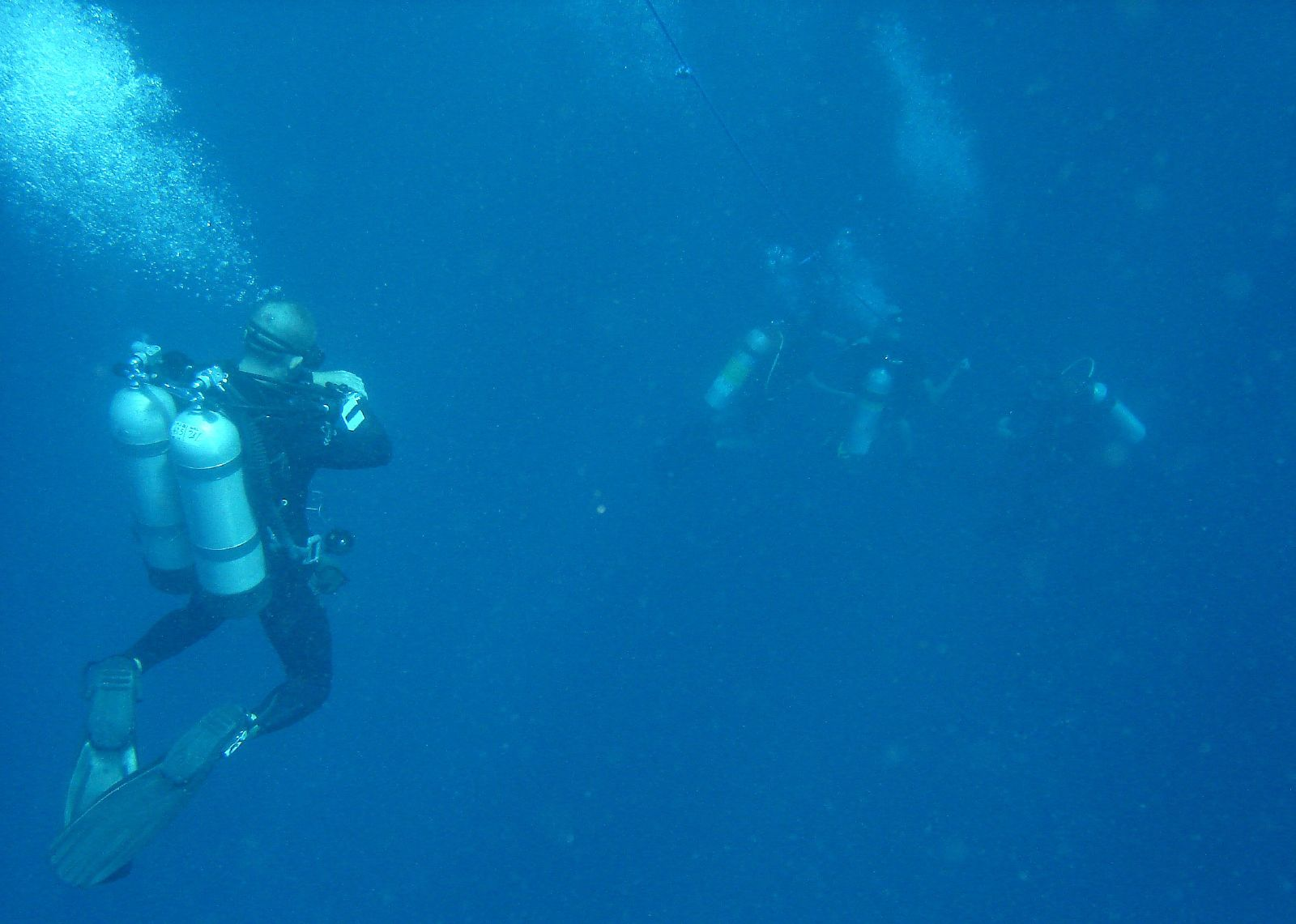
Free floating decompression stop

A diver at the end of a long or deep dive may need to do decompression stops or remain below a decompression ceiling to avoid decompression sickness, also known as "the bends". Metabolically inert gases in the diver's breathing gas, such as nitrogen and helium, are absorbed into body tissues when breathed under high pressure, mainly during the deep phase of the dive. These dissolved gases must be released slowly from the body tissues by controlling the ascent rate to restrict the formation and growth of bubbles. This is usually done by pausing or "doing stops" at various depths during the ascent to the surface. Most technical divers breathe oxygen enriched breathing gas mixtures such as nitrox and pure oxygen during long-duration decompression, as this increases the rate of inert gas elimination. Elimination of inert gases continues during the surface intervals (time spent on the surface between dives), which must be considered when planning subsequent dives. A decompression obligation is also referred to as a "soft", or "physiological" ceiling.

==== Physical ceiling ====
These types of physical overhead, or "hard" or "environmental" ceiling can prevent the diver from surfacing directly:

- Cave diving – diving into a cave system.
- Ice diving – diving under ice.
- Wreck diving – diving inside a shipwreck.
- Diving under any other form of overhead physical obstruction to a direct ascent to the free surface, such as under the hull of a ship or under a harbour or offshore structure or a net.

In all of these situations, a guide line or lifeline from the exit to the diver is the standard method of reducing the risk of being unable to find the way out. A lifeline fixed to the diver is more reliable as it is not easy to lose, and is often used when diving under ice, where the line is unlikely to snag and the distance is reasonably short, and can be tended by a person at the surface. Static guidelines are more suitable when a lifeline is likely to snag on the environment or on other divers in the group, and may be left in situ to be used for other dives, or recovered on the way out by winding back onto the reel. Guidelines may be very much longer than lifelines, and may be branched and marked. They are used as standard practice for cave diving and wreck penetration.

=== Extremely limited visibility ===
Technical dives in waters where the diver's vision is severely impeded by low-visibility conditions, caused by turbidity or silt out and low light conditions due to depth or enclosure, require greater competence. The combination of low visibility and strong current can make dives in these conditions extremely hazardous, particularly in an overhead environment, and greater skill and reliable and familiar equipment are needed to manage this risk. Limited visibility diving can cause disorientation, potentially leading to loss of sense of direction, loss of effective buoyancy control, etc. Divers in extremely limited visibility situations depend on their instruments such as dive lights, pressure gauges, compass, depth gauge, bottom timer, dive computer, etc., and guidelines for orientation and information. Training for cave and wreck diving includes techniques for managing extreme low visibility, as finding the way out of an overhead environment before running out of gas is a safety-critical skill.

== Equipment ==
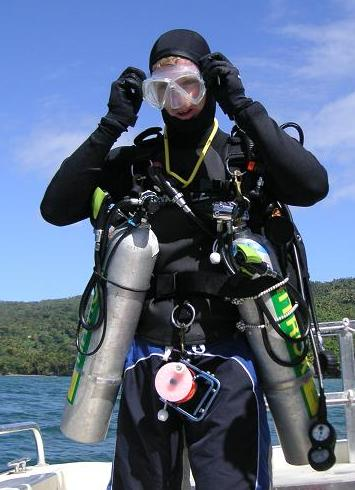
Technical diver with decompression gases in side-mounted stage cylinders

Technical divers may use diving equipment other than the usual single cylinder open circuit scuba equipment used by recreational divers. Typically, technical dives take longer than average recreational scuba dives. Because a decompression obligation prevents a diver in difficulty from surfacing immediately, there is a need for redundancy of breathing equipment. Technical divers usually carry at least two independent breathing gas sources, each with its own gas delivery system. In the event of a failure of one set, the second set is available as a back-up system. The backup system should allow the diver to safely return to the surface from any point of the planned dive, but may involve the intervention of other divers in the team. Stage cylinders may be dropped along the guideline for later use during the exit or for another dive. A stage cylinder is an additional diving cylinder filled with breathing gas and fitted with a regulator.

=== Equipment configuration ===
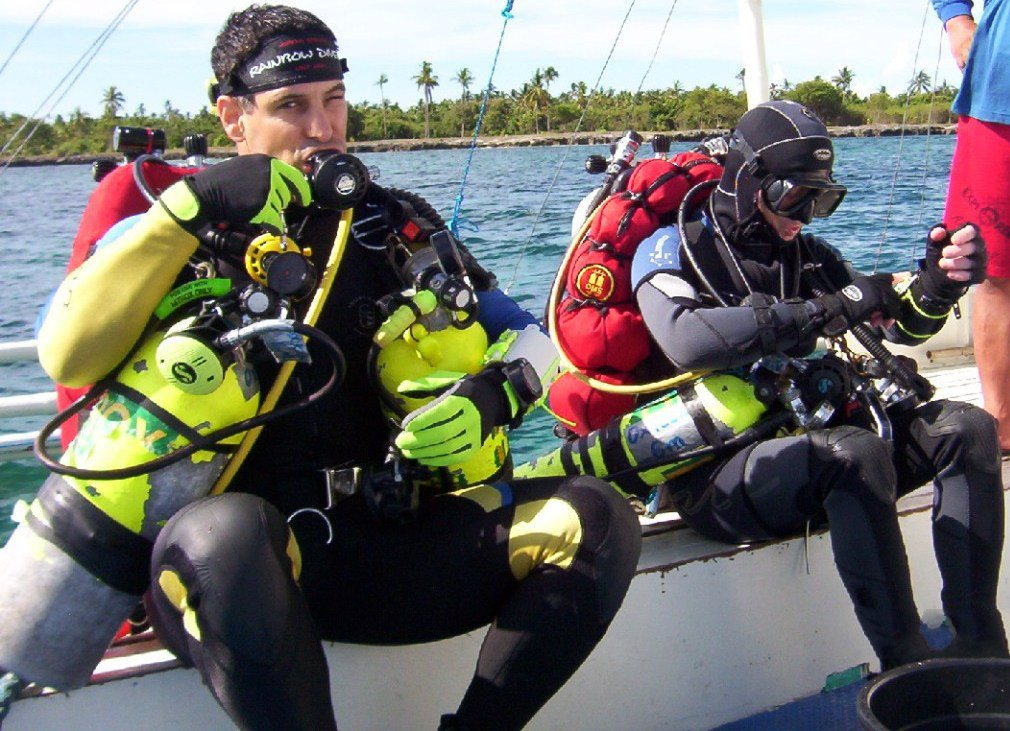
Technical divers preparing for a mixed-gas decompression dive. Note the backplate and wing setup with sidemounted decompression cylinders.

The usual configurations used for increased primary gas supply are manifolded or independent twin back mounted cylinders, multiple side mounted cylinders, or rebreathers. Bailout and decompression gas may be included in these arrangements, or carried separately as side-mounted stage and decompression cylinders. Cylinders may carry a variety of gases depending on when and where they will be used, and as some may not support life if used at the wrong depth, they are marked for positive identification of the contents. Managing the larger number of cylinders is an additional task loading on the diver. Cylinders are usually labeled with the gas mixture and will also be marked with the maximum operating depth and if applicable, minimum operating depth.

=== Gas mixes ===
Technical diving can be done using air as a breathing gas, but other breathing gas mixtures are commonly used to manage specific problems. Some additional knowledge is required to understand the effects of these gases on the body during a dive and additional skills are needed to safely manage their use.

==== Deep air/extended range diving ====
One of the more divisive subjects in technical diving concerns using compressed air as a breathing gas on dives below 130 feet (40 m). Some training agencies still promote and teach courses using air up to depths of 60m. These include TDI, IANTD and DSAT/PADI. Others, including NAUI Tec, GUE, ISE and UTD consider that diving deeper than 100–130 feet (30–40 m), depending upon agency, on air is unacceptably risky. They promote the use of mixtures containing helium to limit the apparent narcotic depth to their agency specified limit should be used for dives beyond a certain limit. Even though TDI and IANTD teach courses using air up to depths of 60m, they also offer courses include "helitrox" "recreational trimix" and "advance recreational trimix" that also use mixtures containing helium to mitigate narcotic concerns when the diving depth is limited to 30-45m.

Such courses used to be referred to as "deep air" courses, but are now commonly called "extended range" courses. The 130 ft limit entered the recreation and technical communities in the USA from the military diving community where it was the depth at which the US Navy recommended shifting from scuba to surface-supplied air. The American scientific diving community represented by the American Academy of Underwater Sciences (AAUS) has never specified a 130-foot limit in its protocols and has never experienced any accidents or injuries during air dives between 130 feet and the deepest air dives that the American scientific diving community permits, 190 feet, where the U.S. Navy Standard Air Tables shifts to the Exceptional Exposure Tables. In Europe, some countries set the recreational diving limit at 50 metres (160 ft), and that corresponds with the limit also imposed in some professional fields, such as police divers in the UK. The major French agencies all teach diving on air to 60 metres (200 ft) as part of their standard recreational certifications.

Deep air proponents base the depth limit of air diving upon the risk of oxygen toxicity. Accordingly, they view the limit as being the depth at which partial pressure of oxygen reaches 1.4 ATA, which occurs at about 186 feet (57 m). Both sides of the community tend to present self-supporting data. Divers trained and experienced in deep air diving report fewer problems with narcosis than those trained and experienced in mixed gas diving trimix/heliox, though scientific evidence does not show that a diver can train to overcome any measure of narcosis at a given depth or become tolerant of it.

The Divers Alert Network does not endorse or reject deep air diving but does note the additional risks involved.

==== Mixtures to reduce decompression time ====
Nitrox is a popular diving gas mix, that reduces the maximum allowable depth as compared to air. Nitrox also allows greater bottom time and shorter surface intervals by reducing the buildup of nitrogen in the diver's tissues. This is accomplished by increasing the percentage of oxygen in the breathing gas. The depth limit of a nitrox mixture is governed by the partial pressure of oxygen, which is generally limited to 1.4 to 1.6 bar depending on the activity of the diver and duration of exposure.

Nitrox mixtures up to 100% oxygen are also used for accelerated decompression.

==== Mixtures to reduce nitrogen narcosis ====
Increased pressure due to depth causes nitrogen to become narcotic, resulting in a reduced ability to react or think clearly. By adding helium to the breathing mix, these effects can be reduced, as helium does not have the same narcotic properties at depth. Helitrox/triox proponents argue that the defining risk for air and nitrox diving depth should be nitrogen narcosis, and suggest that when the partial pressure of nitrogen reaches approximately 4.0 ATA, which occurs at about 130 feet (40 m) for air, helium is necessary to limit the effects of the narcosis.

==== Mixtures to reduce oxygen toxicity ====
Technical dives may also be characterised by the use of hypoxic breathing gas mixtures, including hypoxic trimix, heliox, and heliair. A diver breathing normal air (with 21% oxygen) will be exposed to increased risk of central nervous system oxygen toxicity at depths greater than about 180 feet (55 m) The first sign of oxygen toxicity is usually a convulsion without warning which usually results in death when the demand valve mouthpiece falls out and the victim drowns. Sometimes the diver may get warning symptoms before the convulsion. These can include visual and auditory hallucinations, nausea, twitching (especially in the face and hands), irritability and mood swings, and dizziness.

These gas mixes can also lower the level of oxygen in the mix to reduce the danger of oxygen toxicity. Once the oxygen is reduced below about 18% the mix is known as a hypoxic mix as it does not contain enough oxygen to be used safely at the surface.

== Safety ==
Technical diving encompasses multiple aspects of diving, that typically share a lack of direct access to the surface, which may be caused by physical constraints, like an overhead environment, or physiological, like decompression obligation. In case of emergency, therefore, the diver or diving team must be able to troubleshoot and solve the problem underwater. This requires planning, situational awareness, and redundancy in critical equipment, and is facilitated by skill and experience in appropriate procedures for managing reasonably foreseeable contingencies.

Some rebreather diving safety issues can be addressed by training, others may require a change in technical diver culture. A major safety issue is that many divers become complacent as they become more familiar with the equipment, and begin to neglect predive checklists while assembling and preparing the equipment for use - procedures that are officially part of all rebreather training programs. There can also be a tendency to neglect post-dive maintenance, and some divers will dive knowing that there are functional problems with the unit, because they know that there is generally redundancy designed into the system. This redundancy is intended to allow a safe termination of the dive if it occurs underwater, by eliminating a critical failure point. Diving with a unit that already has a malfunction, means that there is a single critical point of failure in that unit, which could cause a life-threatening emergency if another item in the critical path were to fail. The risk may increase by orders of magnitude.

=== Accident modes ===
Several factors have been identified as predispositions to accidents in technical diving. The techniques and equipment are complex, which increases the risk of errors or omissions - the task loading for a closed circuit rebreather diver during critical phases of a dive is greater than for open circuit scuba equipment, The circumstances of technical diving generally mean that errors or omissions are likely to have more serious consequences than in normal recreational diving, and there is a tendency towards competitiveness and risk-taking among many technical divers which appears to have contributed to some well-publicized accidents.

Some errors and failures that have repeatedly been implicated in technical diving accidents include:

- Incorrect gas switches in open circuit diving; The gas could be hypoxic, with a risk of blackout, hyperoxic, with a risk of oxygen toxicity seizure, or have an excessively high partial pressure of nitrogen, with a risk of nitrogen narcosis.
- Having an incorrect gas in a cylinder resulting in hypoxia, hyperoxia, nitrogen narcosis or inadequate decompression, usually a consequence of failure to analyse all the mixes;
- Incorrect gas consumption calculations and failure to monitor use and change plans during the dive, causing running out of gas before the end of the dive;
- Losing staged decompression gas which was cached to be picked up later;
- The development of an insufficient or excessive oxygen partial pressure in the loop of closed or semi-closed circuit rebreathers;
- High CO_{2} levels in the breathing loop of rebreathers due to scrubber breakthrough;
- Flooding of the rebreather loop rendering it unusable;
- Failure to control depth.

Failure to control depth is critical during decompression, where the inability to stay at the correct depth due to excessive buoyancy is associated with a high risk of decompression sickness and a raised risk of barotrauma of ascent. There are several ways that excessive buoyancy can be caused, some of which can be managed by the diver if prompt and correct action is taken, and others that cannot be corrected. This problem may be caused by poor planning, in that the diver may underestimate the weight loss of using up the breathing gas in all the cylinders, by losing ballast weights during the dive, or by inflation problems with buoyancy compensator or drysuit, or both.

Insufficient ballast weight to allow neutral buoyancy at the shallowest decompression stop with nearly empty cylinders is an example of a buoyancy problem that can generally not be corrected by the diver. If an empty cylinder is positively buoyant, the diver may jettison it and allow it to float away, but if the empty cylinders are negatively buoyant, jettisoning them will exacerbate the problem, making the diver even more buoyant. Drysuit and buoyancy compensator inflation can cause runaway ascent, which can usually be managed if corrected immediately. If the initial problem is caused by loss of ballast weights or a reel jam when deploying an inflatable decompression buoy, and the reel is clipped on, the diver may not be able to manage several simultaneously accelerating buoyancy malfunctions. Dual bladder buoyancy compensators can contain air inadvertently added to the backup bladder, which the diver does not release as it is not supposed to be there in the first place. All of these failures can be either avoided altogether or the risk minimized by configuration choices, procedural methods, and correct response to the initial problem.

Failure to control depth due to insufficient buoyancy can also lead to scuba accidents. It is less of a problem with surface-supplied diving as the depth that the diver can sink to is limited by the umbilical length, and a sudden or rapid descent can often be quickly stopped by the tender. In early diving using copper helmets and a limited flow air supply, a sudden rapid descent could lead to severe helmet squeeze, but this is prevented by demand-supplied gas, and neck dams on later helmets, which allow water to flood the helmet until the gas supply catches up with the compression. Surface supply ensures that the gas supply will not run out suddenly due to high demand, which can deplete scuba supply to the extent that there may not be enough left to surface according to plan. Any sudden increase in depth can also cause barotrauma of the ears and sinuses if the diver cannot equalize fast enough.

=== Accident statistics ===
There is very little reliable data describing the demographics, activities and accidents of the technical diving population. Conclusions about accident rates must be considered tentative. The 2003 DAN report on decompression illness and dive fatalities indicates that 9.8% of all cases of decompression illness and 20% of diving fatalities in the USA happened to technical divers. It is not known how many technical dives this was spread over, but it was considered likely that technical divers are at greater risk.

The techniques and associated equipment that have been developed to overcome the limitations of conventional single-cylinder, open-circuit scuba diving are necessarily more complex and subject to error, and technical dives are often done in more dangerous environments, so the consequences of an error or malfunction are greater. Although the skill levels and training of technical divers are generally significantly higher than those of recreational divers, there are indications that technical divers, in general, are at higher risk, and that closed circuit rebreather diving may be particularly dangerous.

=== Operations ===
Relatively complex technical diving operations may be planned and run like an expedition, or professional diving operation, with surface and in-water support personnel providing direct assistance or on stand-by to assist the expedition divers. Surface support might include surface stand-by divers, boat crew, porters, emergency medical personnel, and gas blenders. In-water support may provide supplementary breathing gas, monitor divers during long decompression stops, and provide communications services between the surface team and the expedition divers. In some cases the risk assessment may persuade the dive team to use similar equipment to that used in professional diving, such as ROV monitoring or the use of a stage or wet bell for the ascent and descent, and having a decompression chamber available at the surface. In an emergency, the support team would provide rescue and if necessary search and recovery assistance.

== Training ==
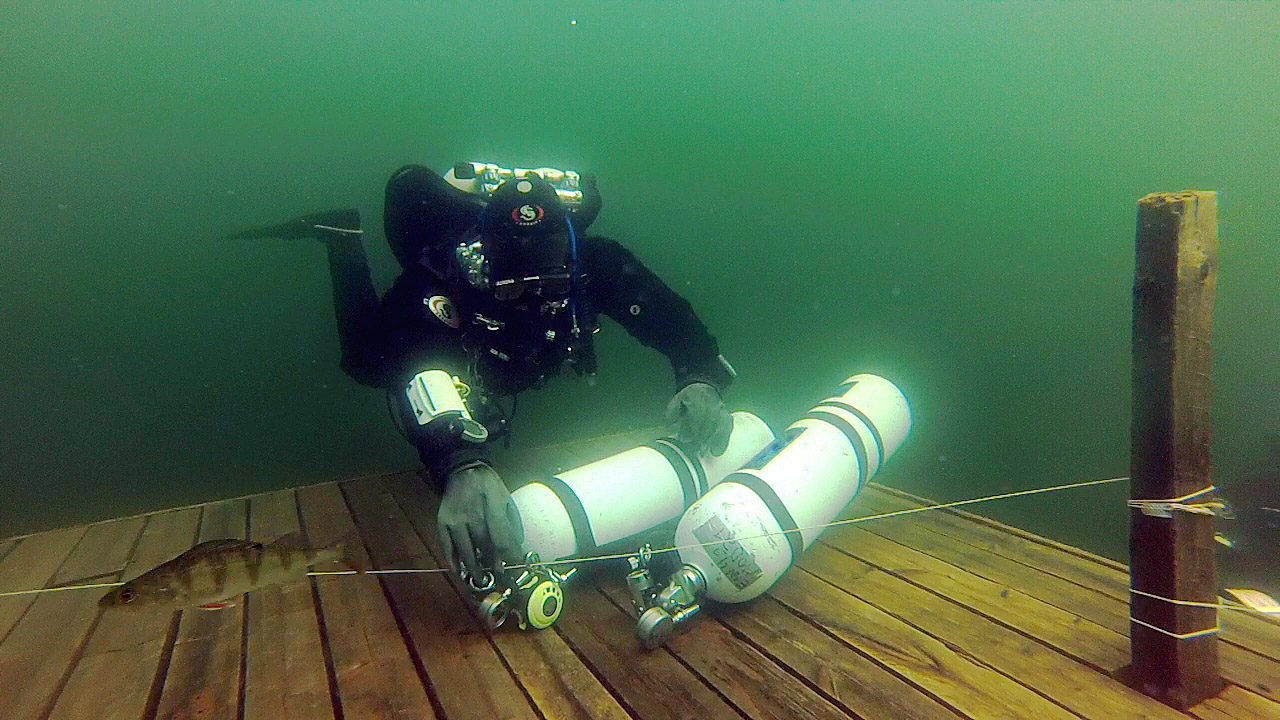
Tech diver training

Technical diving requires specialized equipment and training. There are many technical training organizations: see the Technical Diving section in the list of diver certification organizations. Technical Diving International (TDI), Global Underwater Explorers (GUE), Professional Scuba Association International (PSAI), International Association of Nitrox and Technical Divers (IANTD) and National Association of Underwater Instructors (NAUI) were popular as of 2009. Professional Technical and Recreational Diving (ProTec) joined in 1997. Recent entries into the market include Split-Face Diving (UTD), InnerSpace Explorers (ISE) and Diving Science and Technology (DSAT), the technical arm of Professional Association of Diving Instructors (PADI). The Scuba Schools International (SSI) Technical Diving Program (TechXR – Technical eXtended Range) was launched in 2005.

British Sub-Aqua Club (BSAC) training has always had a technical element to its higher qualifications, however, it has recently begun to introduce more technical level Skill Development Courses into all its training schemes by introducing technical awareness into its lowest level qualification of Ocean Diver, for example, and nitrox training will become mandatory. It has also recently introduced trimix qualifications and continues to develop closed-circuit training.

=== Certification ===
Technical diving certification is issued by several recreational diver training agencies, under a variety of names, often with considerable overlap or in some cases split into depth ranges. The certification titles vary between agencies but can be categorized as:

- Advanced nitrox diver, a scuba diver certified as competent to dive in open water using open circuit nitrogen-based gas mixtures that are safe to breathe at atmospheric pressure, and decompress using approved schedules on gases carried by the diver, usually including oxygen or oxygen-rich nitrox
- Normoxic trimix diver, a scuba diver certified as competent to dive in open water using open circuit trimix gases which are safe to breathe at atmospheric pressure, and decompress using approved schedules, on gases carried by the diver, usually including oxygen or oxygen-rich nitrox.
- Hypoxic trimix diver, or Advanced trimix diver, a scuba diver certified as competent to dive in open water using open circuit trimix gases which are not safe to breathe at atmospheric pressure, to use a travel gas to descend through the depth range in which the bottom gas is unsafe, and decompress using approved schedules, on gases carried by the diver, usually including oxygen or oxygen-rich nitrox.
- Rebreather certification for various types of diving rebreather. Training in the use of rebreathers has two components: Generic training for the class of rebreather, including the theory of operation, general procedures as well as specific training for the model of rebreather; which covers the details of preparation, testing, user maintenance, and troubleshooting, and those details of normal operating and emergency procedures which are specific to the model of rebreather. Crossover training from one model to another generally only requires the second aspect if the equipment is similar in design and operation.
  - Nitrox semi-closed circuit rebreather diver,
  - Nitrox closed circuit rebreather diver,
  - Mixed gas rebreather diver. This may distinguish between normoxic and hypoxic depth ranges.
- Cave diver, of various grades,
- Wreck penetration diver, of various grades,

== See also ==
- Breathing gas – Gas used for human respiration
- Hypercapnia, also known as Carbon dioxide poisoning – Abnormally high tissue carbon dioxide levels
- List of diving hazards and precautions – Hazards associated with underwater diving
- Rebreather diving – Underwater diving using self contained breathing gas recycling apparatus
- Oxygen toxicity – Toxic effects of breathing oxygen at high partial pressures
- Solo diving – Recreational diving without a dive buddy
- Trimix – Breathing gas consisting of oxygen, helium and nitrogen
