= Surface-supplied diving =

Underwater diving breathing gas supplied from the surface

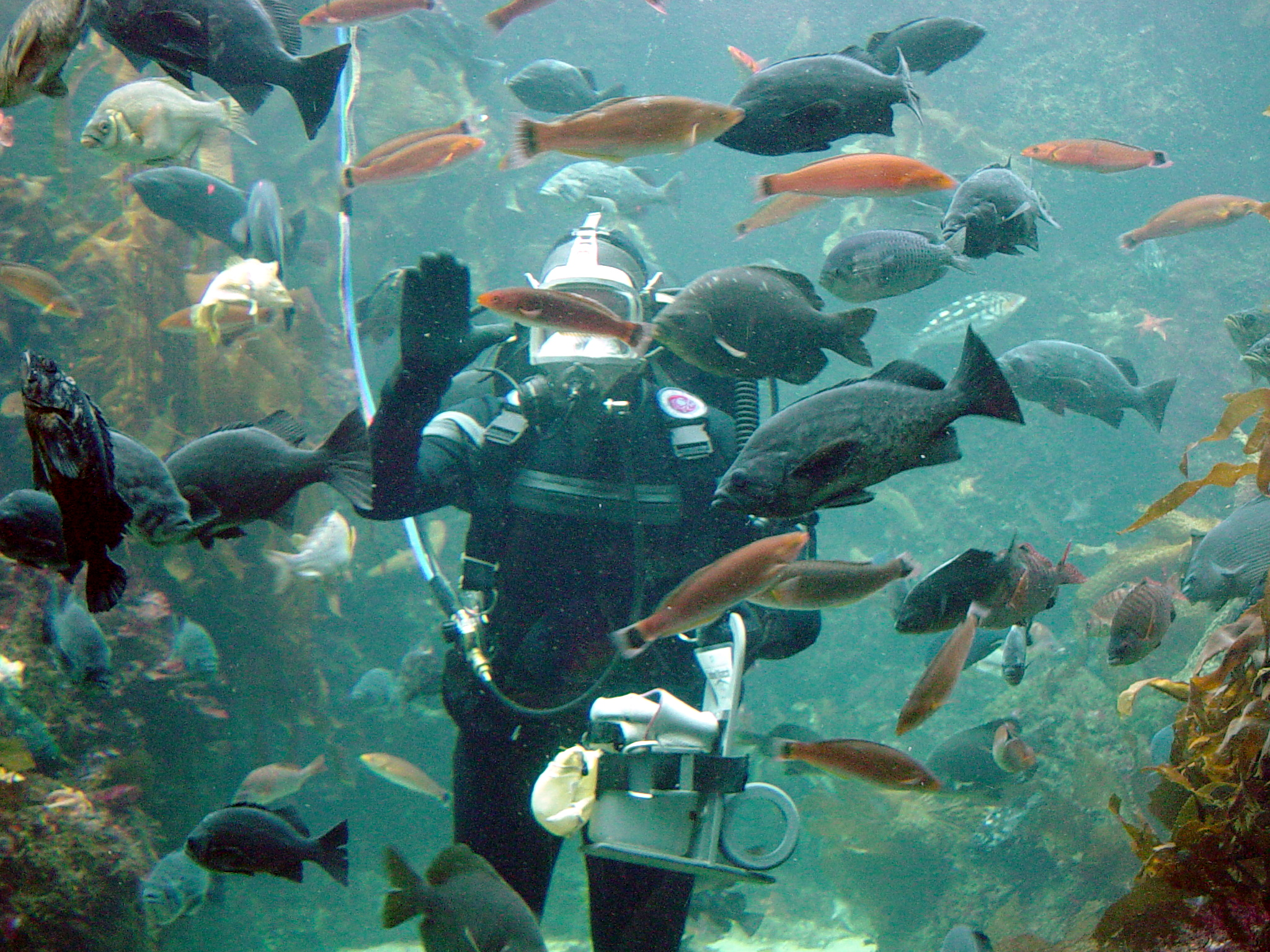
Surface-supplied diver at the Monterey Bay Aquarium, Monterey, California

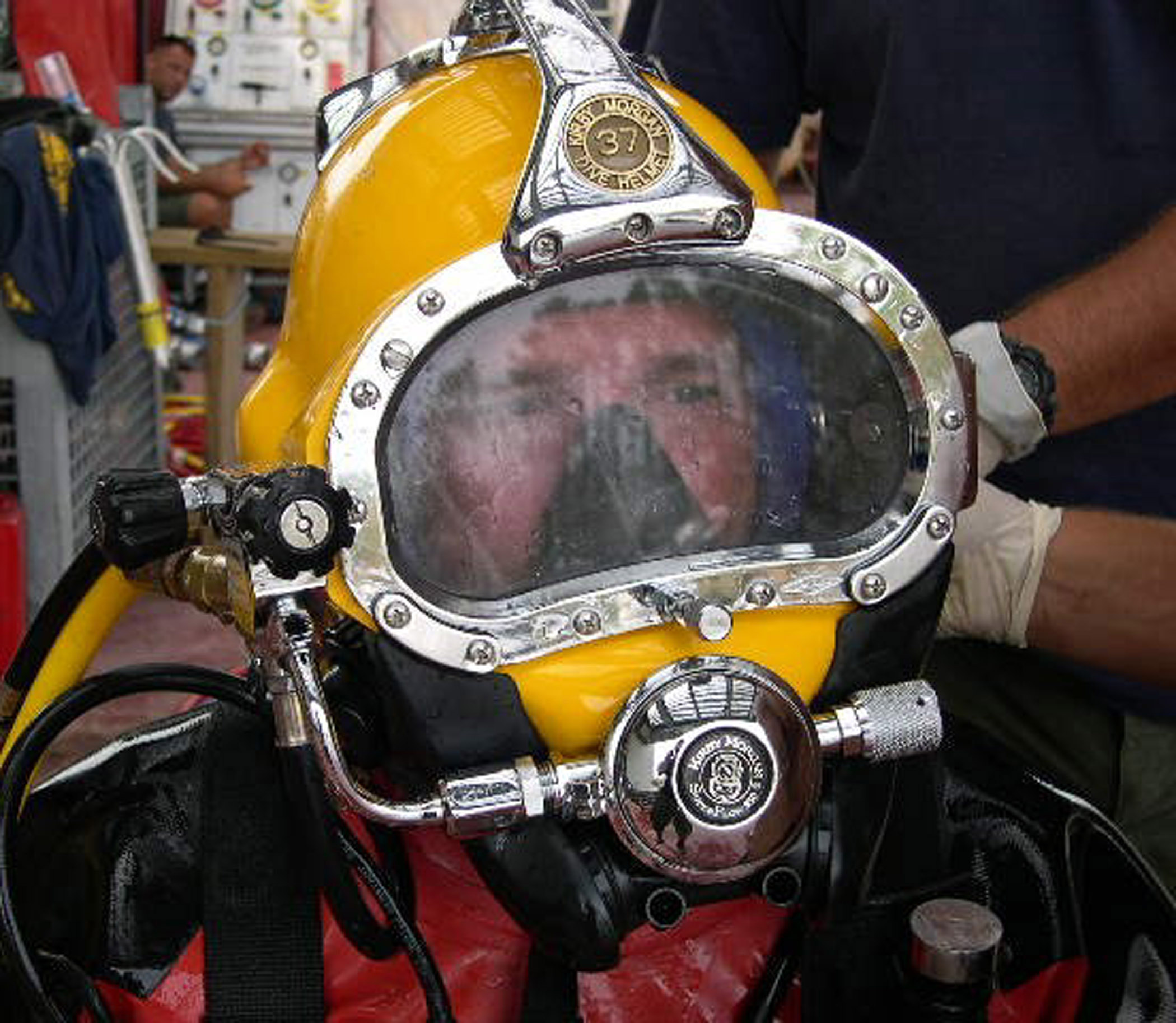
US Navy Diver using Kirby Morgan Superlight 37 diving helmet

Surface-supplied diving is a mode of underwater diving using equipment supplied with breathing gas through a diver's umbilical from the surface, either from the shore or from a diving support vessel, sometimes indirectly via a diving bell. This is different from scuba diving, where the diver's breathing equipment is completely self-contained and there is no essential link to the surface. The primary advantages of conventional surface-oriented surface-supplied diving are lower risk of drowning and considerably larger breathing gas supply than scuba, allowing longer working periods and safer decompression. It is also nearly impossible for the diver to get lost. Disadvantages are the absolute limitation on diver mobility imposed by the length of the umbilical, encumbrance by the umbilical, and high logistical and equipment costs compared with scuba. The disadvantages restrict use of this mode of diving to applications where the diver operates within a small area, which is common in commercial diving work.

The copper helmeted free-flow standard diving dress is the version which made commercial diving a viable occupation, and although still used in some regions, this heavy equipment has been superseded by lighter free-flow helmets, and to a large extent, lightweight demand helmets, band masks and full-face diving masks. Breathing gases used include air, heliox, nitrox and trimix.

Saturation diving is a mode of surface supplied diving in which the divers live under pressure in a saturation system or underwater habitat and are decompressed only at the end of a tour of duty.

Air-line, or hookah diving, and "compressor diving" are lower technology variants also using a breathing air supply from the surface.

== Variations ==
There are two basic modes of surface-supplied diving, and several variations for supplying breathing gas to divers from the surface.

=== Surface oriented diving ===
Surface oriented diving, with or without a stage or open bell, is where the diver starts and ends the dive at surface pressure. The diver is decompressed during the ascent or by surface decompression in a decompression chamber. It may also be referred to as bounce diving, an ambiguous term.

In addition to the standard system of surface-supplied diving using a diver's umbilical and diving helmet or full-face diving mask to provide the diver with compressed atmospheric air from a low-pressure diving compressor, there are other configurations in use for surface oriented diving:

Technically, atmospheric suit diving, scuba diving and freediving are also "surface oriented", but are not "surface-supplied".

==== Scuba replacement ====
Scuba replacement is a surface-supplied diving mode where both the primary and reserve breathing gas supplies are from high-pressure storage cylinders. The rest of the system is identical to the standard surface supply configuration, and the full umbilical system, bailout cylinder, communications and surface gas panel are used. This is more portable than most compressors and is used by commercial diving contractors as a substitute for scuba with most of the advantages and disadvantages of a regular compressor fed surface air supply. The assembled combination of equipment is called a scuba replacement package (SRP). Scuba replacement equipment is used where compact, portable surface supplied equipment is needed for rapid deployment by small craft or road vehicle. It is also used where the ambient air is contaminated and unsuitable for use as a breathing gas when compressed, such as some situations in hazmat diving.

==== Standard diving dress ====
Standard, or heavy gear is the historical copper helmet, waterproofed canvas suit, and weighted boots. The original system used a manually powered diver's pump to supply air, and no reserve gas or bailout cylinder was provided. As the technology became available, voice communication was added, and mechanically driven compressors were used.

==== Air-line diving ====
Air-line diving uses an air line hose in place of a full diver's umbilical to supply breathing air from the surface. If any of the required components of a diver's umbilical are absent this term applies. There are subcatgories of air-line diving:

- Hookah diving – A basic form of surface-supplied diving in which the air supply is via a single hose is often referred to as air line or Hookah (occasionally Hooka) diving. This often uses a standard scuba second stage as the delivery unit, but is also used with light full-face masks. Bailout gas may be carried, but this is not always the case. Commercial diamond divers working in the shallow zone off the west coast of South Africa under the codes of practice of the Department of Minerals and Energy use half mask and demand valve hookah. Their safety record is relatively poor, as a bailout cylinder is seldom carried. When done using a diving compressor with suitable breathing air quality and an appropriate emergency gas supply, there is no obvious reason why hookah diving should be more dangerous than scuba diving in the same conditions. A concern is that if the diver is supplied from a compressor in a boat, the intake must be clear of any exhaust fumes, which is also the case for surface supplied diving using a full umbilical.
- Snuba and SASUBA – A system used to supply air from a cylinder mounted on a float to a recreational diver tethered by a short (approximately 6 m) hose through a scuba regulator.
- Compressor diving – An even more basic system is the "Compressor diving" arrangement used in the Philippines and Caribbean for fishing. This rudimentary and highly hazardous system uses a large number of small bore plastic tubes connected to a single compressor to supply a large number of divers simultaneously. The delivery end of the hose is unencumbered by any mechanism or mouthpiece, and is simply held by the diver's teeth. Air supply is free flow and often unfiltered, and varies with depth and number of divers drawing off the system, with greater flow going to divers with a shorter hose and at shallower depth. A kink or restriction in a hose can cut off a diver's air supply without warning.

==== Bell bounce diving ====
Bell bounce diving, also known as transfer under pressure diving, is where the divers are transported vertically through the water in a closed bell and transferred under pressure into a surface decompression chamber for decompression, or decompressed in the bell. This mode of diving is most likely to be used when the dive is relatively deep, and the decompression is likely to be long, but neither deep enough nor long enough to justify the costs of setting up for saturation diving. The mode was often used with mixed breathing gases. but is also used for long air dives shallower than 50 m.

A development of this system uses a set of decompression chambers mounted in a lifeboat for the routine surface decompression of the divers. The lifeboat is positioned between the transfer chamber and the side of the deck, and can be launched by the davits included in the package. This avoids the necessity for an additional hyperbaric evacuation system.

=== Saturation diving ===
In saturation diving, the diver is transferred under pressure from the pressurised accommodation to the underwater worksite, which is at a similar pressure, and back in a closed bell, only decompressing once at the end of the contract.

=== Open, closed, and semi-closed circuit systems ===
The surface-supplied diving mode can be further qualified by the management of exhaled and bypassed breathing gas. In open-circuit mode it is discharged directly into the ambient environment. In semi-closed or gas-extender mode, it is partly recirculated and scrubbed to remove carbon dioxide, and partly replenished to maintain an acceptable oxygen partial pressure., with the balance discharged to the ambient environment. In closed circuit and gas reclaim systems, most to all of the gas is scrubbed, re-oxygenated, and made available for either immediate or later re-use. Full or partial recycling is usually used to make more economical use of helium based gases due to the high cost of helium and the large quantities used at the depths where it is needed.

== Alternatives ==
Alternative modes of diving may be used to attain the objectives of a surface-supplied dive in some circumstances:

- Scuba diving, which is commonly used for recreational diving and scientific diving, is the main alternative to surface-supplied diving. Scuba is available in open circuit and rebreather configurations.
- Atmospheric diving suits such as the JIM suit and the Newtsuit, and crewed submersibles with manipulator arms, isolate the occupant from the ambient pressure, but are bulky, expensive, and allow limited dexterity and agility.
- Uncrewed submersibles (ROVs and AUVs) which can operate deeper and avoid exposing a diver to underwater hazards, have their applications, but lack the dexterity of a diver at present (2011).
- Freediving, or breathhold diving, is extremely limited in duration and exposes the diver to relatively high risk.

== Application ==
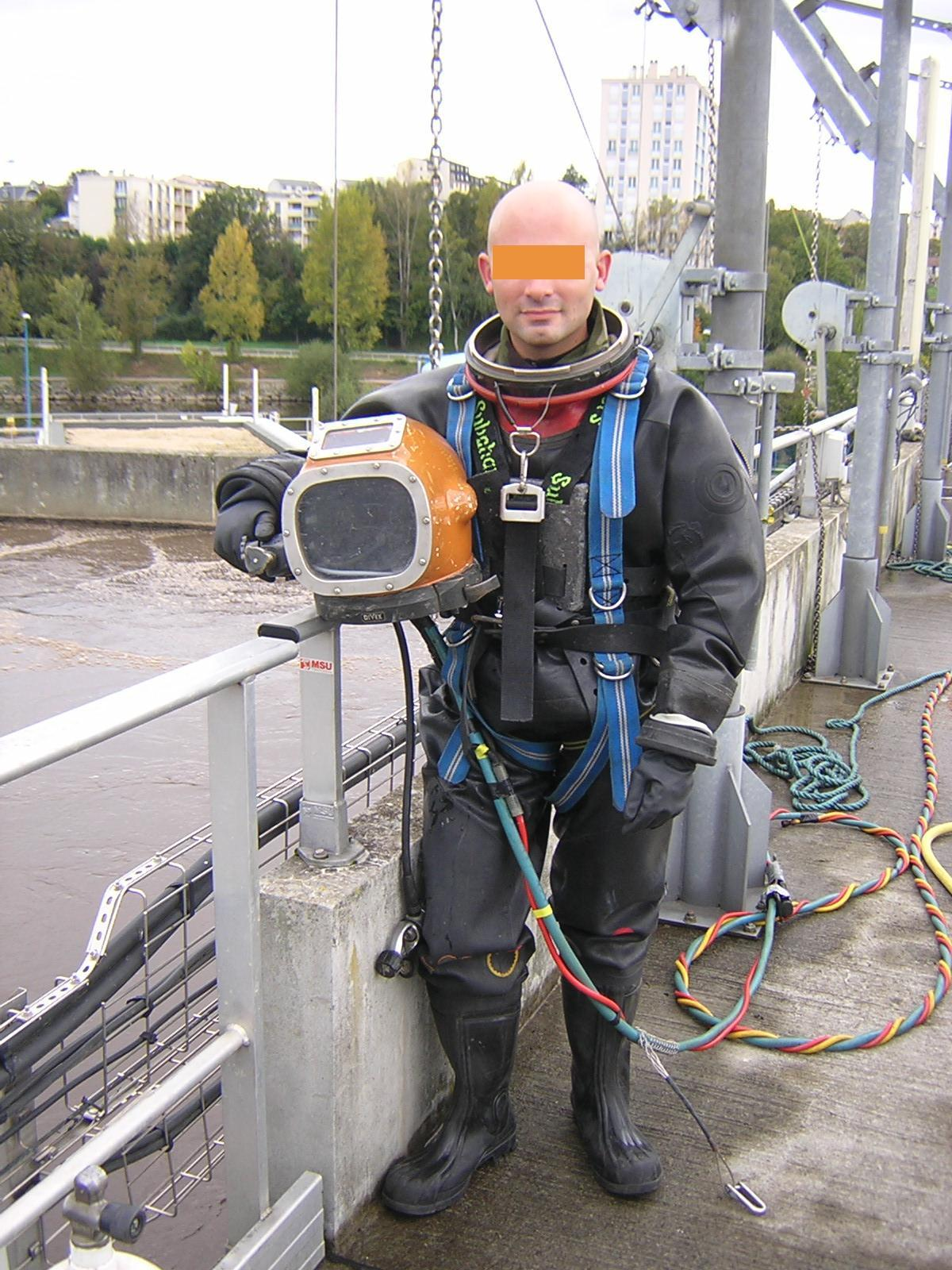
Free flow helmets are commonly used for diving in contaminated water

Surface-supplied diving equipment and techniques are mainly used in professional diving due to the greater cost and complexity of owning and operating the equipment. This type of equipment is used in saturation diving, as the gas supply is relatively secure, and the diver can not bail out to the surface, and for diving in contaminated water, where the diver must be protected from the environment, and helmets are generally used for environmental isolation.

A major limitation of surface-supplied diving is the presence of an umbilical between the surface control point and the diver, which encumbers the diver's mobility, restricts their range of access to the environment, and requires an attendant to manage the umbilical, which can get snagged on underwater obstructions even when correctly tended. Where this limitation is acceptable, the connection with the diver provides some advantages, in that the diver can find their way back to the control point by following the umbilical, and a standby diver can reach the diver by following the umbilical.

There has been development of low-cost airline systems for shallow recreational diving, where limited training is offset by physically limiting the depth accessible.

There are two major advantages to surface supplied diving: The breathing gas supply is not limited to the ability of the diver to carry it, and is monitored from the surface, reducing the task load on the diver, and the diver is in continuous communication with the surface control point, so their safety can be monitored effectively. The physical constraint of the umbulical is sometimes a limitation on mobility and radius of activity, and at other times a safety feature, preventing access to known hazards and identifying the route back to a place of safety.

== History ==
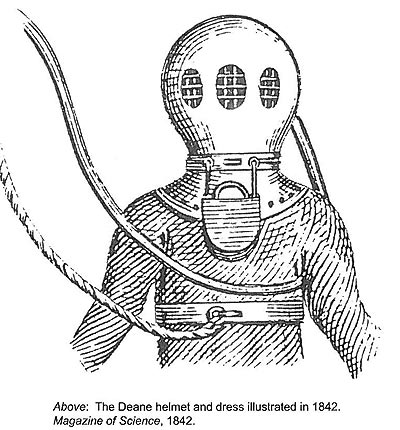
1842 sketch of the Deane brothers' diving helmet, the first surface-supplied diving dress equipment in the world.

The first successful surface-supplied diving equipment was produced by the brothers Charles and John Deane in the 1820s. Inspired by an accident John witnessed in a stable in England, during which he rescued several horses from smoke filled stable they designed and patented a "Smoke Helmet" to be used by firemen in smoke-filled areas in 1823. The apparatus comprised a copper helmet with an attached flexible collar and jacket. A long leather hose attached to the rear of the helmet was to be used to supply air - the original concept being that it would be pumped using a double bellows. A continuous airflow passed through the helmet, and the user breathed from it and exhaled back into it. A short pipe allowed excess air to escape. The garment was constructed from leather or airtight cloth, secured by straps.

The brothers had insufficient funds to build the equipment themselves, so they sold the patent to their employer, Edward Barnard. It was not until 1827 that the first smoke helmets were built, by German-born British engineer Augustus Siebe. In 1828 they decided to find another application for their device and converted it into a diving helmet. They marketed the helmet with a loosely attached "diving suit" so that a diver could perform salvage work but only in a vertical position, otherwise water entered the suit.

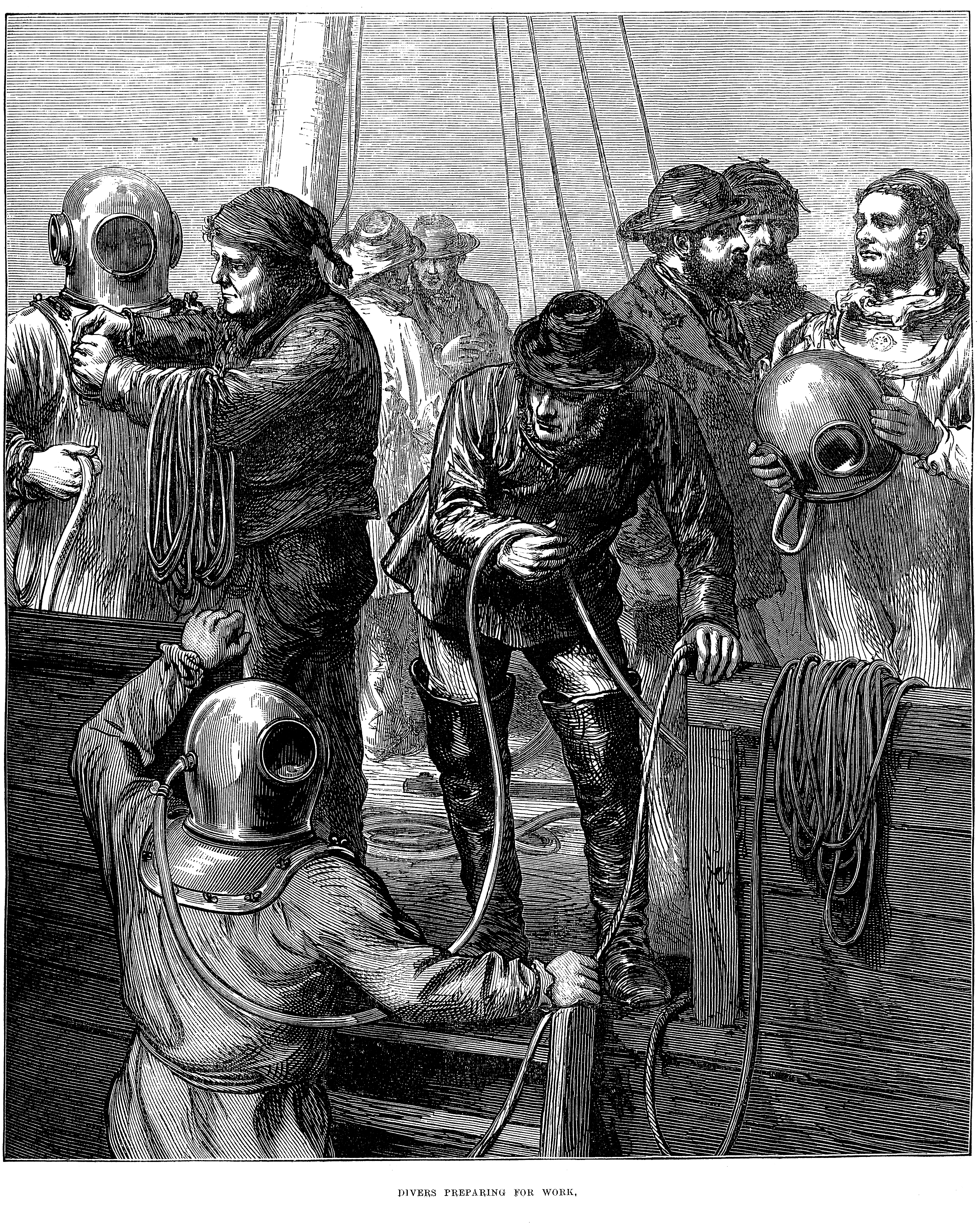
Siebe's improved design in 1873.

In 1829 the Deane brothers sailed from Whitstable for trials of their new underwater apparatus, establishing the diving industry in the town. In 1834 Charles used his diving helmet and suit in a successful attempt on the wreck of HMS Royal George at Spithead, during which he recovered 28 of the ship's cannon. In 1836, John Deane recovered timbers, guns, longbows, and other items from the rediscovered Mary Rose shipwreck. By 1836 the Deane brothers had produced the world's first diving manual, Method of Using Deane's Patent Diving Apparatus which explained in detail the workings of the apparatus and pump, plus safety precautions.

In the 1830s the Deane brothers asked Siebe to apply his skill to improve their underwater helmet design. Expanding on improvements already made by another engineer, George Edwards, Siebe produced his own design; a helmet fitted to a full-length watertight canvas diving suit. The success of the Siebe helmet was due to an exhaust non-return valve, which prevented flooding through the exhaust port.

Siebe introduced various modifications on his diving dress design to accommodate the requirements of the salvage team on the wreck of HMS Royal George, including making the helmet be detachable from the corselet; his improved design gave rise to the typical standard diving dress which revolutionised underwater civil engineering, underwater salvage, commercial diving and naval diving.

== Equipment ==
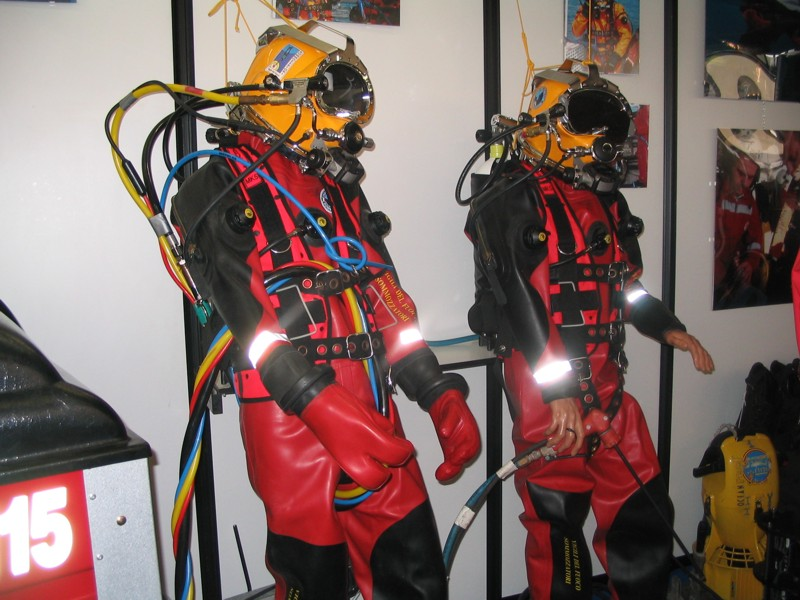
Surface-supplied commercial diving equipment on display at a trade show

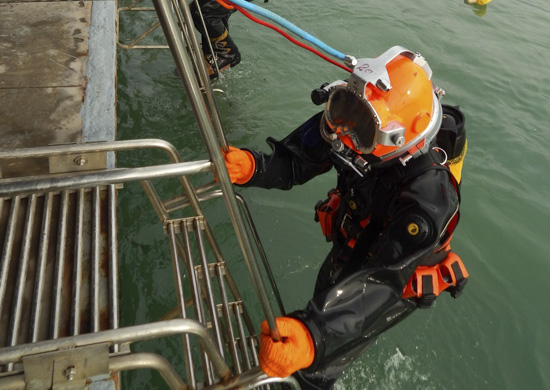
Diver of the Black Sea Fleet in diving equipment SVU-5

The essential aspect of surface-supplied diving is that breathing gas is supplied from the surface, either from a specialised diving compressor, high-pressure cylinders, or both. In commercial and military surface-supplied diving, a backup source of surface-supplied breathing gas should always be present in case the primary supply fails. The diver may also wear a bailout cylinder which can provide self-contained breathing gas in an emergency. Thus, the surface-supplied diver is less likely to have an "out-of-air" emergency than a scuba diver using a single gas supply, as there are normally two alternative breathing gas sources available. Surface-supplied diving equipment usually includes communication capability with the surface, which enhances the safety and efficiency of the working diver.

The equipment needed for surface supplied diving can be broadly grouped as diving and support equipment, but the distinction is not always clear. Diving support equipment is the equipment used to facilitate a diving operation. It is either not taken into the water during the dive, such as the gas panel and compressor, or is not integral to the actual diving, being there to make the dive easier or safer, such as a surface decompression chamber. Some equipment, like a diving stage, is not easily categorised as diving or support equipment, and may be considered as either.

Surface-supplied diving equipment is required for a large proportion of the commercial diving operations conducted in many countries, either by direct legislation, or by authorised codes of practice, as in the case of IMCA operations. Surface-supplied equipment is also required under the US Navy operational guidance for diving in harsh contaminated environments which was drawn up by the Navy Experimental Diving Unit.

=== Breathing apparatus ===
The definitive equipment for surface-supplied diving is the breathing apparatus which is supplied with primary breathing gas from the surface via a hose, which is usually part of a diver's umbilical connecting the surface supply systems with the diver, sometimes directly, otherwise via a bell umbilical and bell panel.

==== Helmets ====
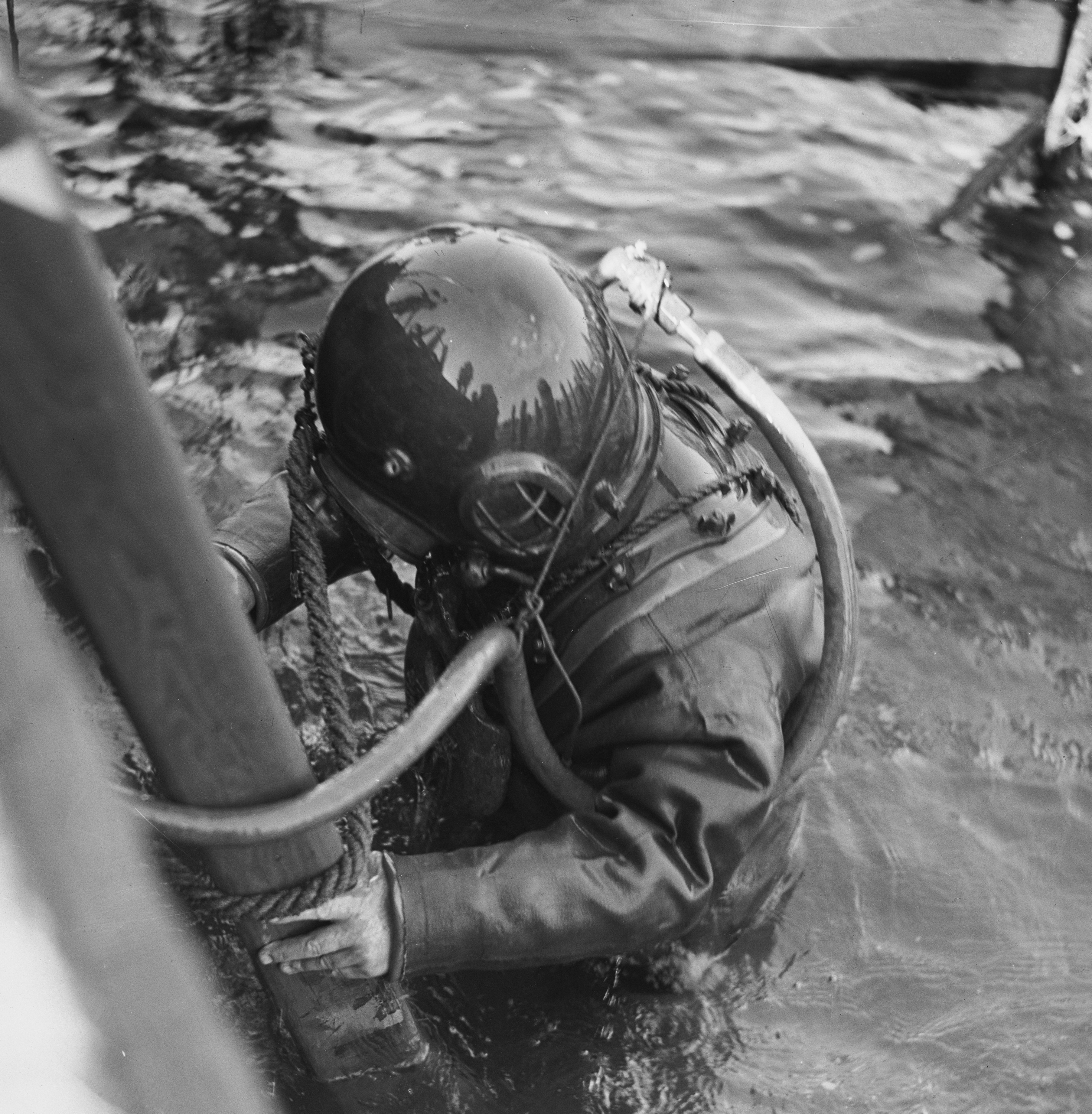
Diver at Rose Bay, Sydney Harbour, 1938

Lightweight demand helmets are rigid structures which fully enclose the head of the diver and supply breathing gas "on demand". The flow of gas from the supply line is activated by inhalation reducing the pressure in the helmet to slightly below ambient, and a diaphragm in the demand valve uses this pressure difference to open the valve allowing breathing gas to flow into the helmet until the pressure inside the helmet again balances the ambient pressure and the lever returns to the shut position. This is exactly the same principle as used for scuba demand valves, and in some cases the same components are used. Sensitivity of the lever can often be adjusted by the diver by turning a knob on the side of the demand valve.

Lightweight demand helmets are available in open circuit systems which exhaust to the surrounding water, used when breathing standard air or nitrox, and closed circuit (reclaim) systems used to reduce costs when breathing mixed gas with a large helium fraction. The exhaled gas is returned to the surface through a reclaim valve, a type of back-pressure regulator in the helmet, via the umbilical, scrubbed of carbon dioxide, filtered of odour and micro-organisms, re-oxygenated, and recompressed to storage.

The helmet shell may be of metal or reinforced plastic composite (GRP), and is either connected to a neck dam or clamped directly to a drysuit. The neck dam is on the lower part of the helmet, which seals around the neck of the diver in the same way as the neck seal of a dry suit. Attachment to the neck dam is critical to diver safety and a reliable locking mechanism is needed to ensure that it is not inadvertently released during a dive.

Demand breathing systems reduce the amount of gas required to adequately ventilate the diver, as gas is only supplied when the diver inhales, but the slightly increased work of breathing caused by this system is a disadvantage at extreme levels of exertion, where free-flow systems may be better. The demand system is also quieter than free-flow, particularly during the non-inhalation phase of breathing. This can make voice communication more effective. The breathing of the diver is also audible to the surface team over the communications system, and this helps to monitor the condition of the diver and is a valuable safety feature.

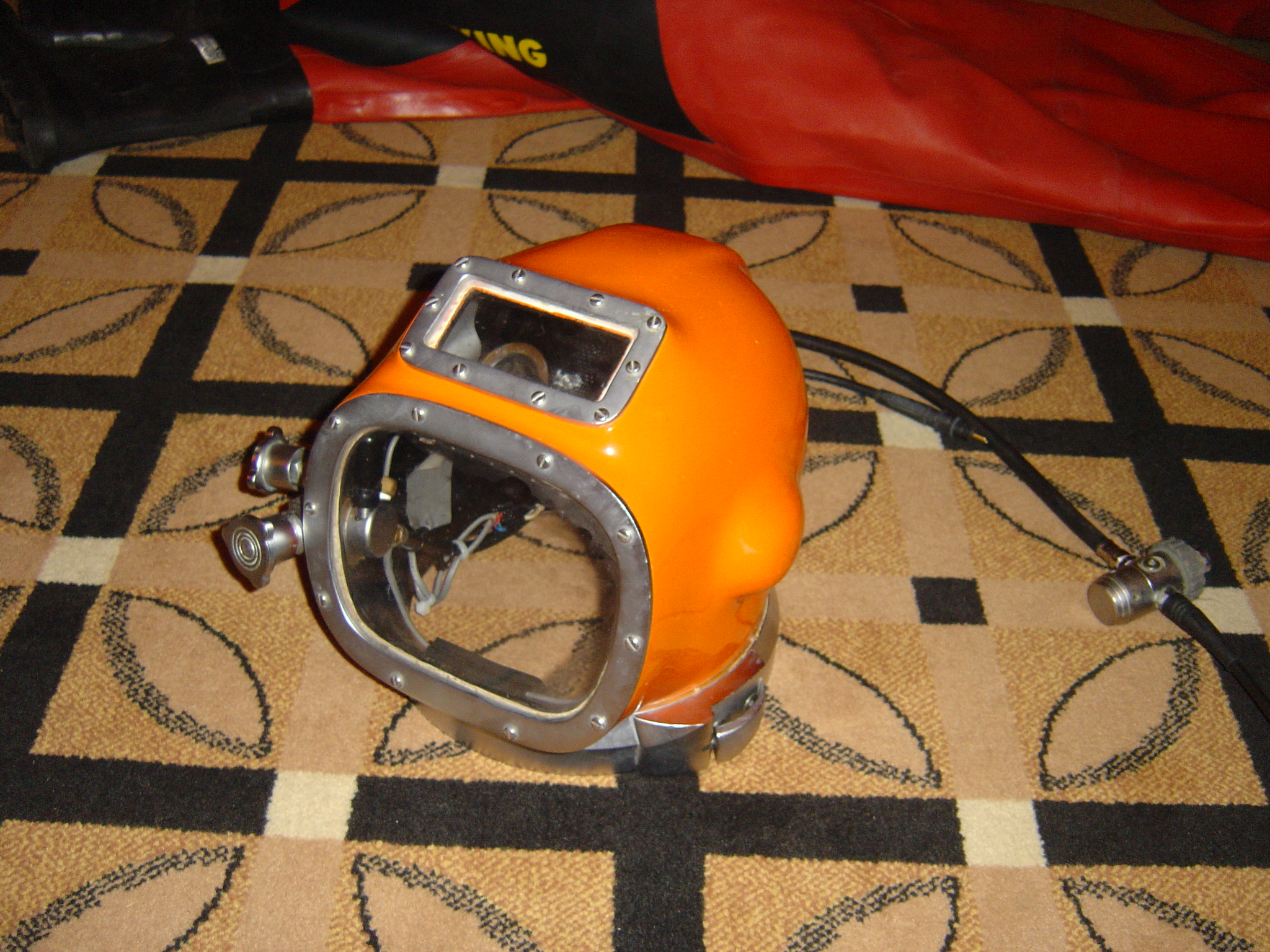
Front view of an AH3 free flow diving helmet

A free-flow diving helmet supplies a continuous flow of air to the diver, who breathes it as it flows past. Mechanical work of breathing is minimal, but flow rate must be high if the diver works hard, and this is noisy, affecting communications and requiring hearing protection to avoid damage to the ears. This type of helmet is popular where divers have to work hard in relatively shallow water for long periods. It is also useful when diving in contaminated environments, where the helmet is sealed onto a dry suit, and the entire system is kept at a slight positive pressure by adjusting the back-pressure of the exhaust valve, to ensure that there is no leakage into the helmet. This type of helmet is often large in volume, and if it is attached to the suit, it does not move with the head. The diver must move their body to face anything they want to see. For this reason the faceplate is large and there is often an upper window or side windows to improve the field of vision.

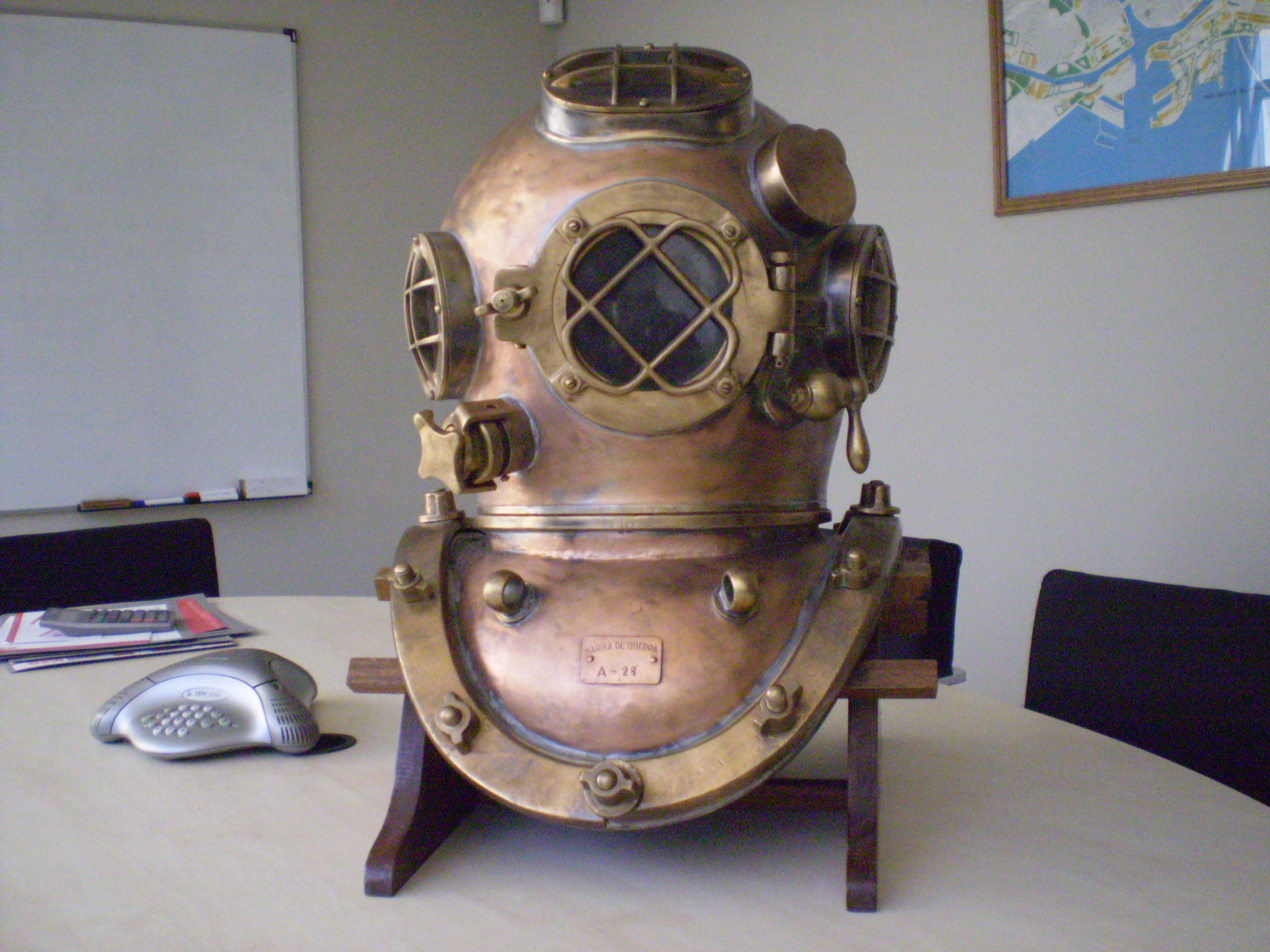
Copper diving helmet with threaded connection between bonnet and corselet

The standard diving helmet (Copper hat) is made of two main parts: the bonnet, which covers the diver's head, and the corselet which supports the weight of the helmet on the diver's shoulders, and is clamped to the suit to create a watertight seal. The bonnet is attached and sealed to the corselet at the neck, either by bolts or an interrupted screw-thread, with some form of locking mechanism.

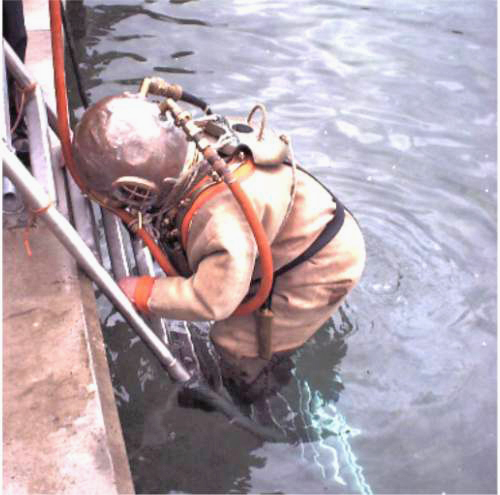
Diver in standard dress entering the water

The bonnet is usually a copper shell with soldered brass fittings. It covers the diver's head and provides sufficient space to turn the head to look out of the glazed faceplate and other viewports (windows). The front port can usually be opened for ventilation and communication when the diver is on deck, by being screwed out or swung to the side on a hinge. The other viewports are generally fixed.

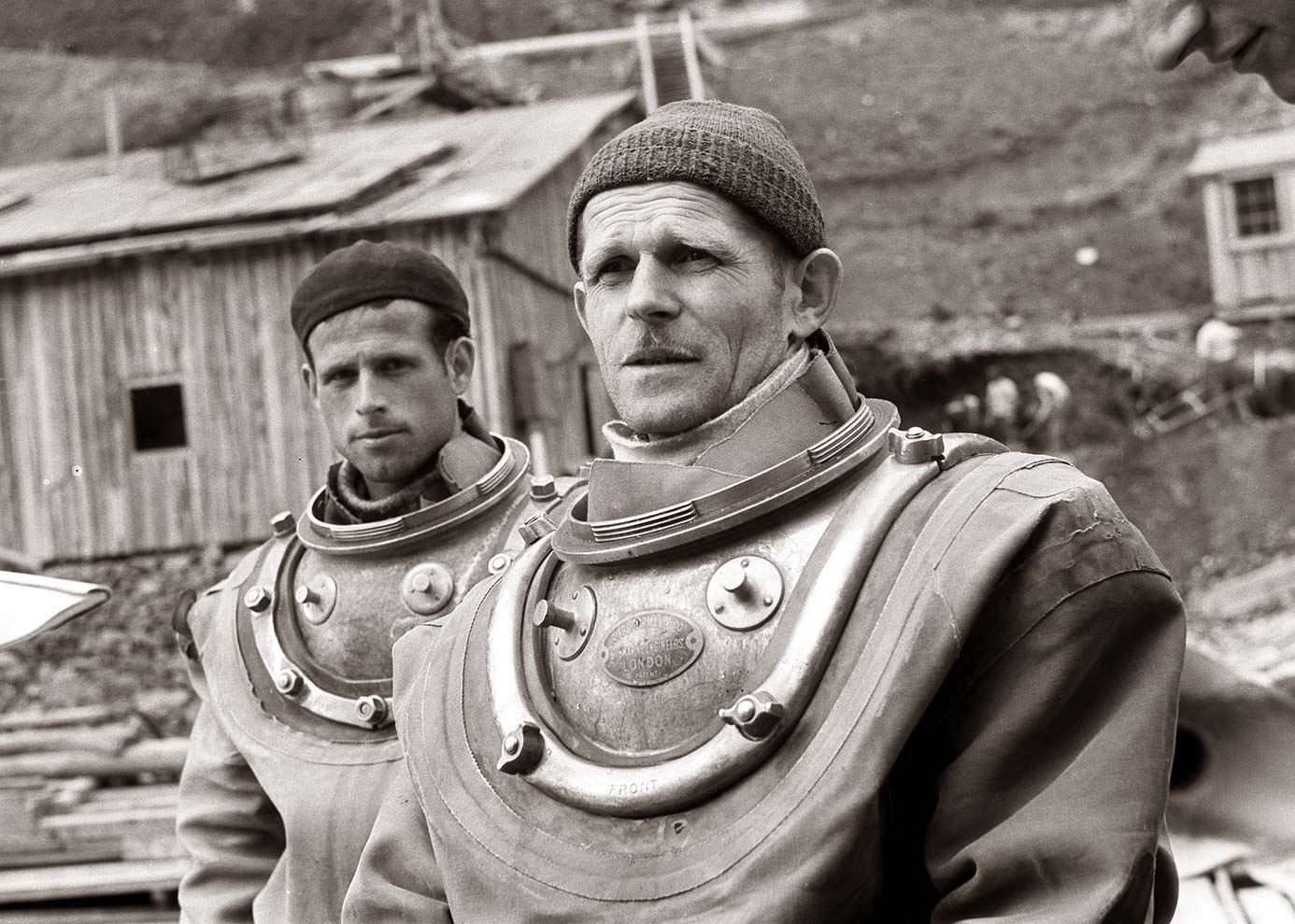
Corselet showing interrupted thread for helmet connection and brailes clamping it to the suit. 12-bolt in background, 6-bolt in foreground.

The corselet, also known as a breastplate or gorget, is an oval or rectangular collar-piece resting on the shoulders, chest and back, to support the helmet and seal it to the suit. The helmet is usually connected to the suit by clamping the rubberised collar of the suit to the rim of the corselet to make a water-tight seal. Most six and twelve bolt bonnets are joined to the corselet by 1/8th turn interrupted thread with a safety lock.

An alternative method is to bolt the bonnet to the corselet over a rubber collar seal bonded to the neck opening of the suit.

==== Band mask ====
A band mask is a heavy duty full-face mask with many of the characteristics of a lightweight demand helmet. In structure it is the front section of a lightweight helmet from above the faceplate to below the demand valve and exhaust ports, including the bailout block and communications connections on the sides. This rigid frame is attached to a neoprene hood by a metal clamping band, hence the name. It is provided with a padded sealing surface around the frame edge which is held firmly against the diver's face by a rubber "spider", a multiple strap arrangement with a pad behind the diver's head, and usually five straps which hook onto pins on the band. The straps have several holes so the tension can be adjusted to get a comfortable seal. A band mask is heavier than other full face masks, but lighter than a helmet, and can be donned more quickly than a helmet. They are often used by the standby diver for this reason.

==== Full-face mask ====
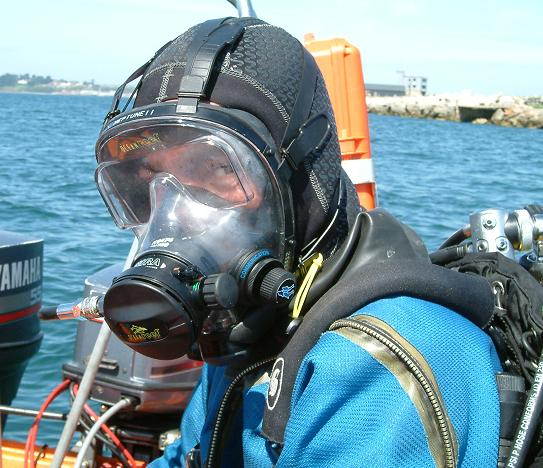
A diver wearing an Ocean Reef full face mask

A full-face mask encloses both mouth and nose, which reduces the risk of the diver losing the air supply compared to a half mask and demand valve. Some models require a bailout block to provide alternative breathing gas supply from the umbilical and bailout cylinder, but are not suitable for accepting an alternative air supply from a rescue diver, while a few models accept a secondary demand valve which can be plugged into an accessory port (Draeger, Apeks and Ocean Reef). The unique Kirby Morgan 48 SuperMask has a removable DV pod which can be unclipped to allow the diver to breathe from a standard scuba demand valve with mouthpiece.

Despite the improvement in diver safety provided by the more secure attachment of the breathing apparatus to the diver's face, some models of full face mask can fail catastrophically if the faceplate is broken or detached from the skirt, as there is then no way to breathe from the mask. This can be mitigated by carrying a standard secondary second stage, and preferably also a spare half mask.

A full face mask is lighter and more comfortable for swimming than a helmet or band mask, and usually provides an improved field of vision, but it is not as secure, and does not provide the same level of protection as the heavier and more sturdily constructed equipment. The two types of equipment have different ranges of application. Most full face masks are adaptable for use with scuba or surface supply. The full face mask does not usually have a bailout block fitted, and this is usually attached to the diver's harness, with a single hose to supply the mask from main or bailout gas which is selected at the block. The strap arrangement for full face masks is usually quite secure, but not as secure as a bandmask or helmet, and it is possible for it to be dislodged in the water. However it is also quite practicable for a trained diver to replace and clear a full face mask under water without assistance, so this is more an inconvenience than a disaster unless the diver is rendered unconscious at the same time.

=== Breathing gas supply ===
==== Diver's umbilical ====
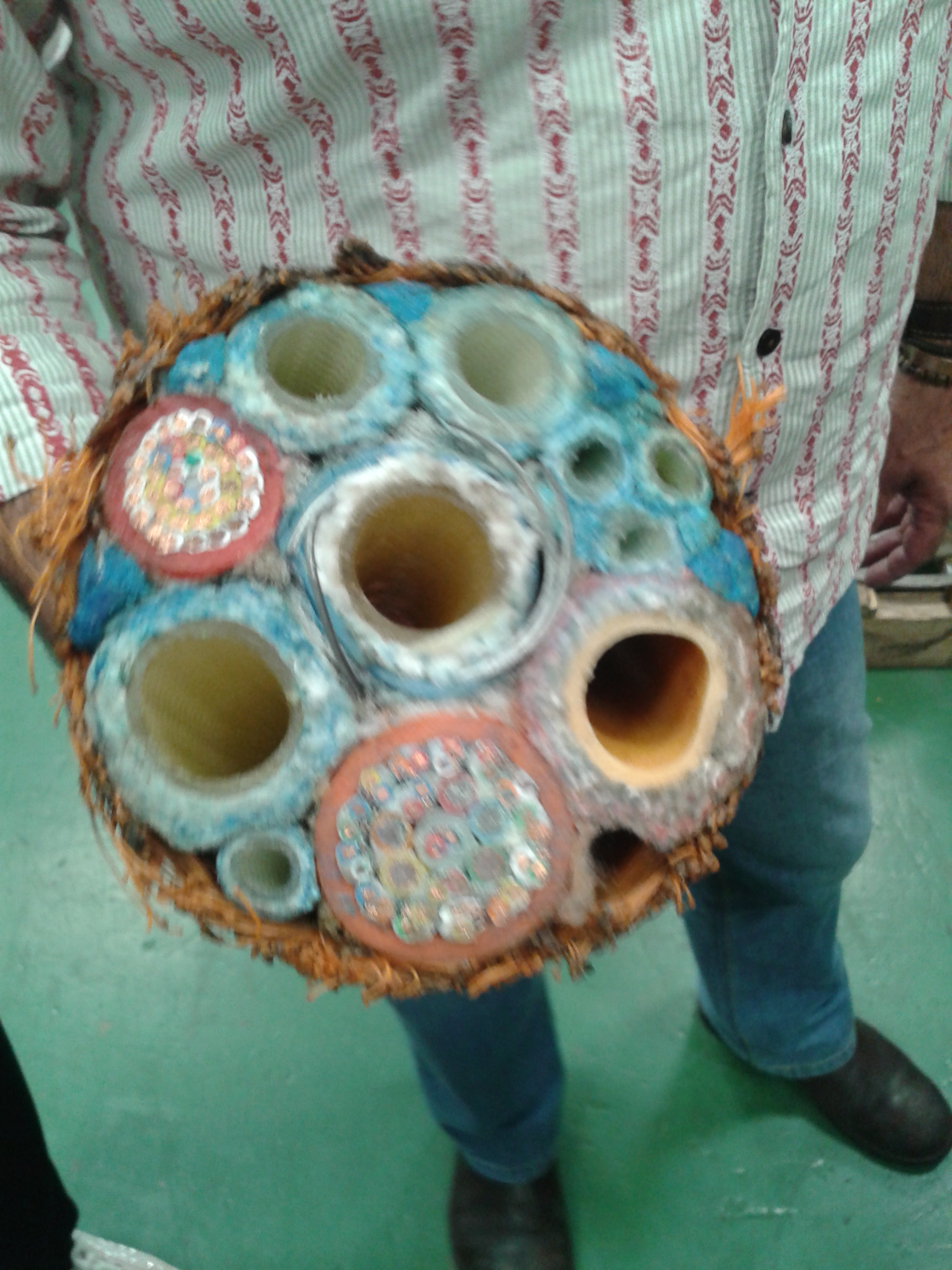
Bell umbilical section, containing among other components, hot water supply hoses.

The umbilical contains a hose to supply the breathing gas and usually several other components. These usually include a communications cable (comms wire), a pneumofathometer, and a strength member, which may be the breathing gas hose, communications cable, or a rope. When needed, a hot water supply line, helium reclaim line, video camera and lighting cables may be included. These components are neatly twisted into a multistrand cable, or taped together, and are deployed as a single unit. The diver's end has underwater connectors for the electrical cables, and the hoses are usually connected to the helmet, band mask, or bailout block by JIC fittings. A screw-gate carabiner or similar connector is provided on the strength member for attachment to the diver's harness, and may be used to lift the diver in an emergency. Similar connections are provided for attachment to the diving bell, if used, or to the surface gas panel and communications equipment. A diver's umbilical supplied from a bell gas panel is called an excursion umbilical, and the supply from the surface to the bell panel is the bell umbilical.

==== Air-line ====
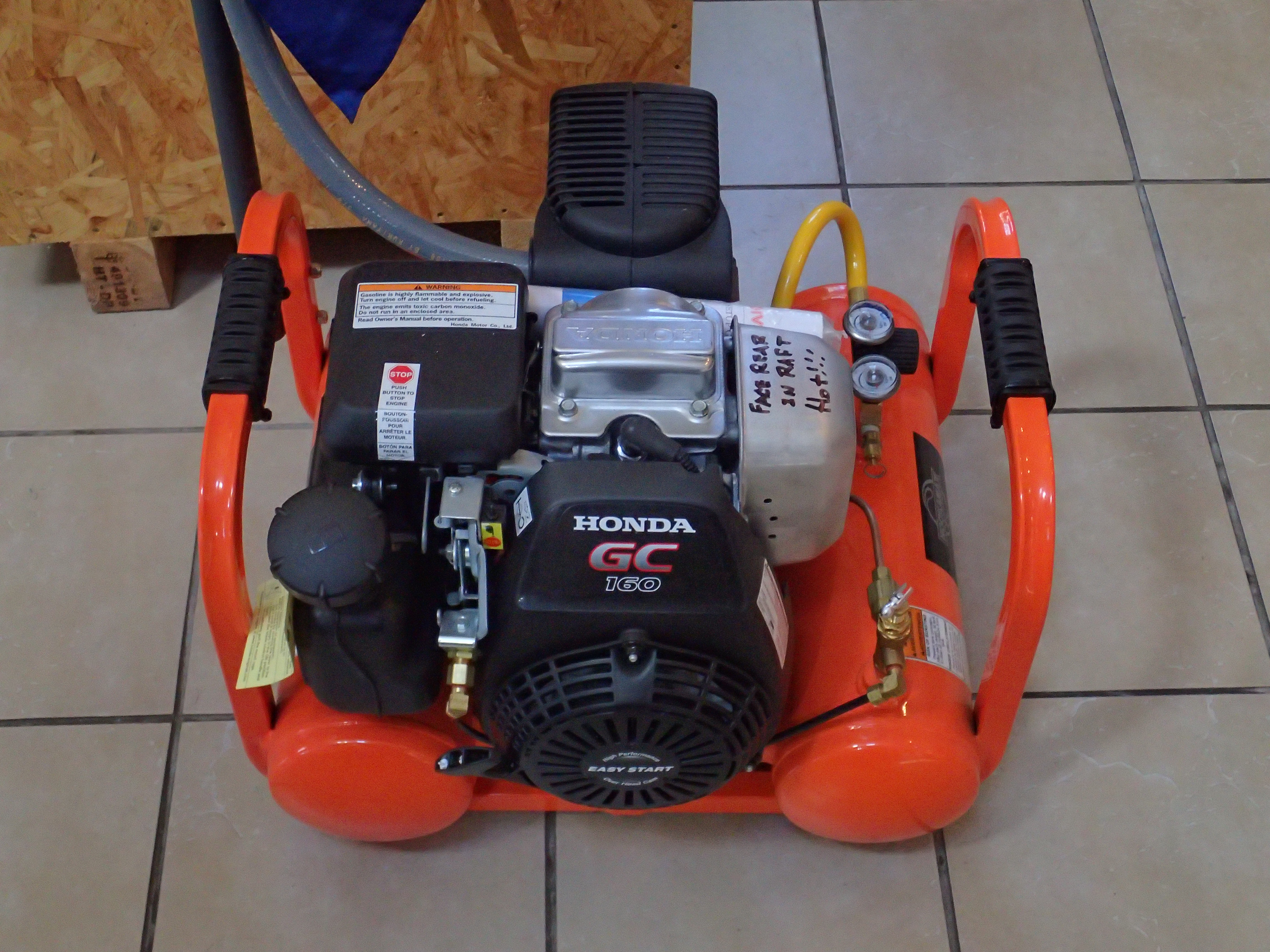
Low pressure breathing air compressor intended for air-line diving

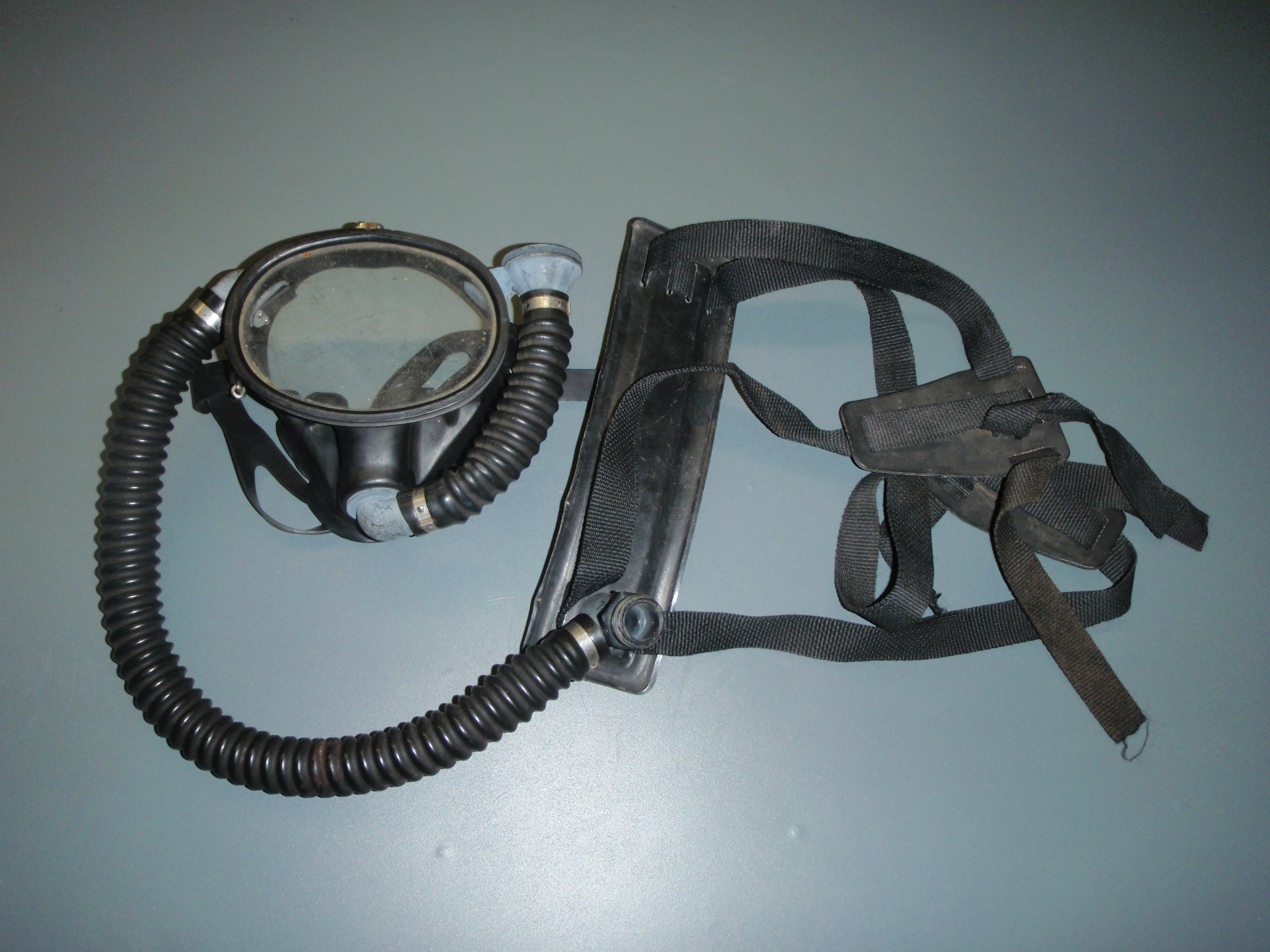
A lightweight full face mask used with a free-flow air-line system (obsolescent)

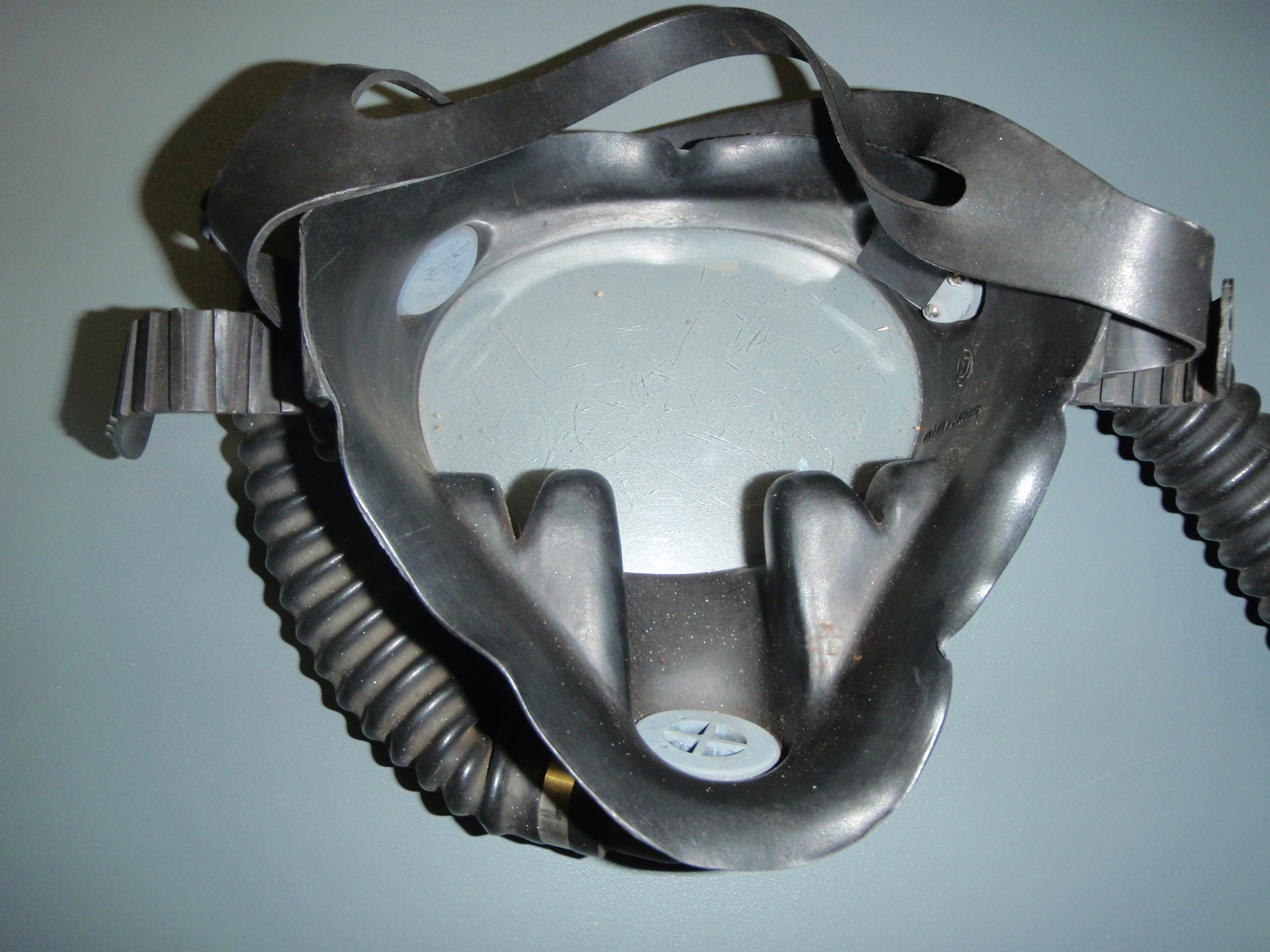
Inside view of a lightweight free-flow air-line mask (obsolescent)

Hookah, Sasuba and Snuba systems are categorised as "air-line" equipment, as they do not include the communication, lifeline and pneumofathometer hose characteristic of a full diver's umbilical. Most hookah diving uses a demand system based on a standard scuba second stage, but there have been special purpose free-flow full-face masks specifically intended for hookah diving (see photos). A bailout system, or emergency gas supply (EGS) is not an inherent part of an air-line diving system, though it may be required in some applications.

Their field of application is very different from full surface-supplied diving. Hookah is generally used for shallow water work in low-hazard applications, such as archaeology, aquaculture, and aquarium maintenance work, but is also sometimes used for open water hunting and gathering of seafood, shallow water mining of gold and diamonds in rivers and streams, and bottom cleaning and other underwater maintenance of boats, hull cleaning, swimming pool maintenance, and shallow underwater inspections. Sasuba and Snuba are mainly a shallow water recreational application for low-hazard sites.

The systems used to supply air through the hose to a demand valve mouthpiece, are either 12-volt electrical air pumps, gasoline engine powered low-pressure compressors, or floating scuba cylinders with high pressure regulators. These hookah diving systems usually limit the hose length to allow less than 7 metres depth. The exception is the gasoline engine powered unit, which requires a much higher level of training and topside supervision for safe use.

A notable exception to this trend are the inshore diamond diving operations on the west coast of South Africa, where hookah is still the standard equipment for diamondiferous gravel extraction in the hostile conditions of the surf zone, where the water temperature is usually around 8 to 10 °C, visibility is usually low, and surge is often strong. Divers work shifts of about two hours with a crowbar and a suction hose, are heavily weighted to stay in place while working, and the standard method of ascent is to ditch the weighted harness and regulator and make a free swimming ascent. The next diver will free dive down the air line, fit the regulator and wriggle into the harness before continuing with the job. Until the South African abalone fishery was closed, hookah was the only mode of diving permitted for harvesting wild abalone.

==== Gas panel ====
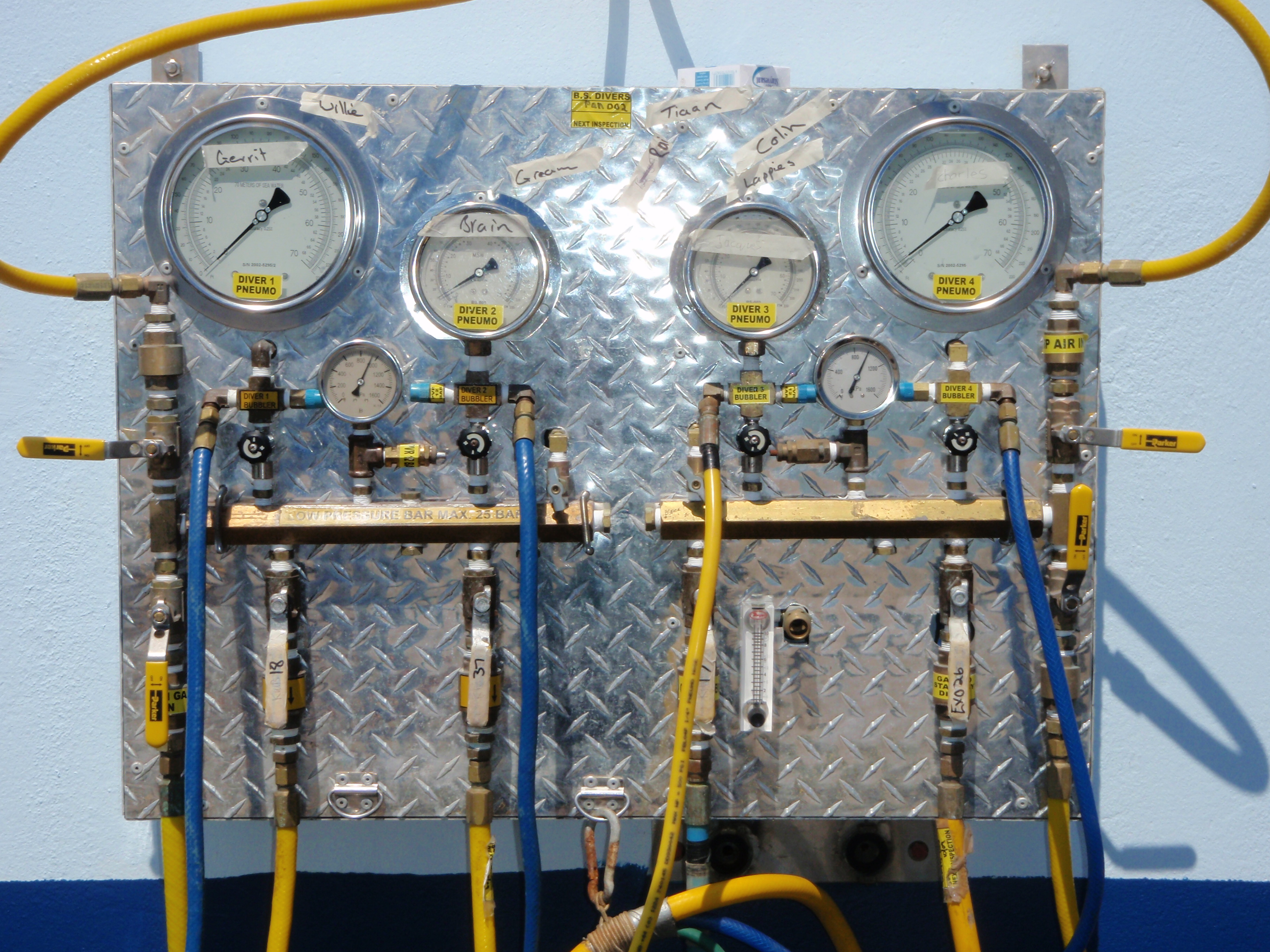
A surface supply panel for four divers. This panel can use an independent gas supply for each side of the panel

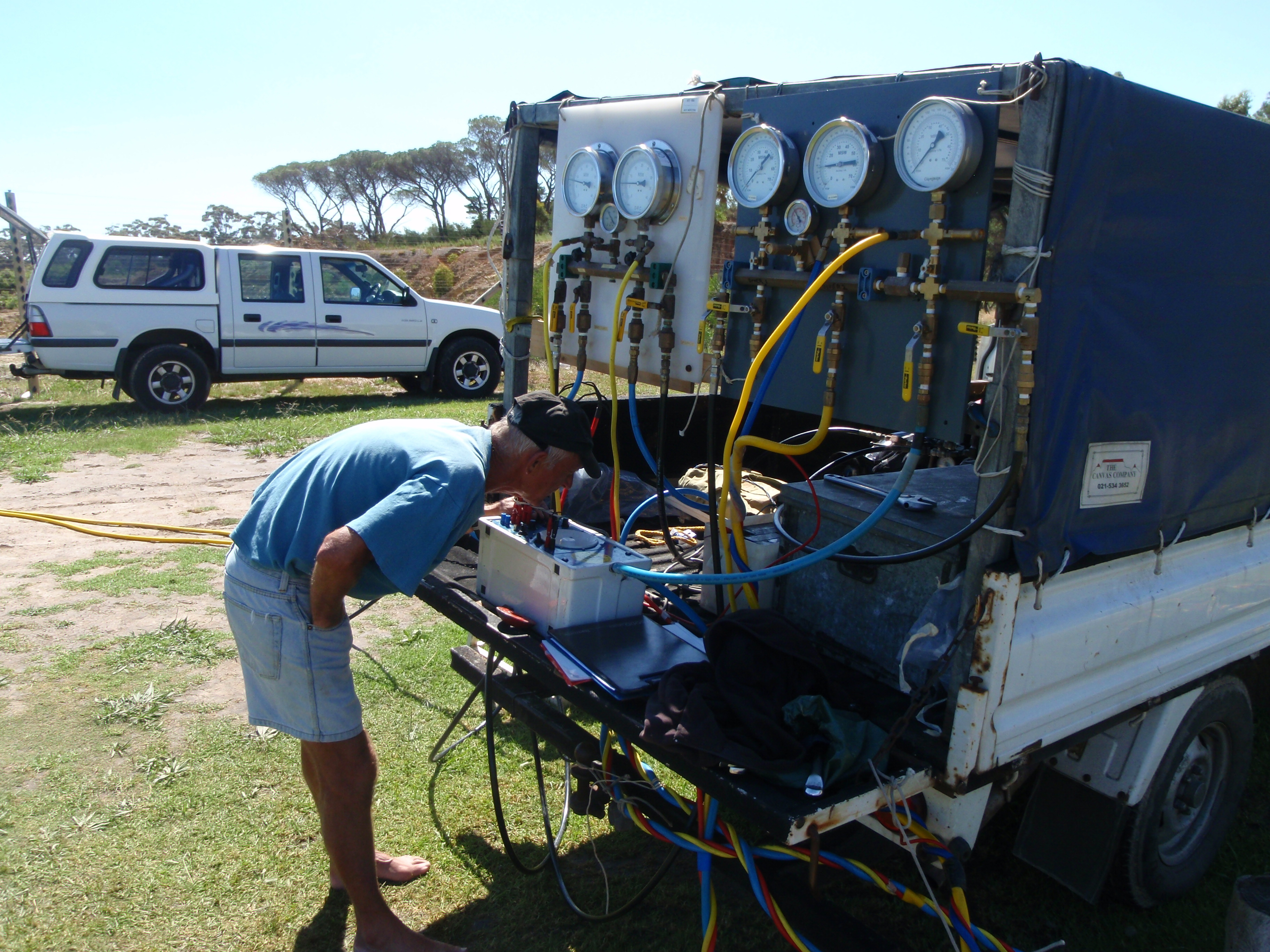
Surface supply air panels. On the left for two divers, on the right for three divers

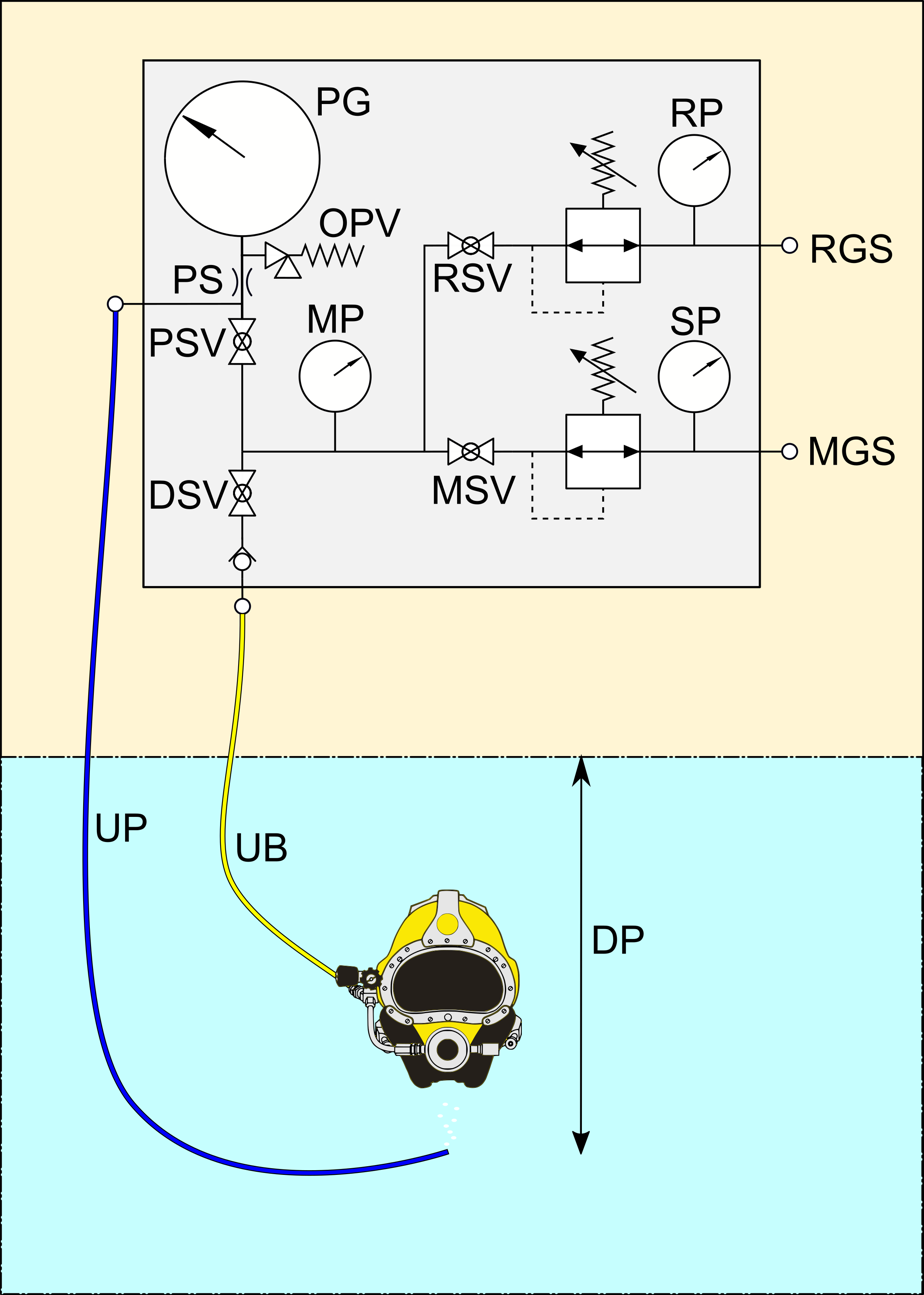
Surface supplied diving gas panel for one diver: PG: pneumofathometer gauge; OPV: overpressure valve; PS: pneumo snubber; PSV: pneumo supply valve; DSV: diver supply valve; MP: manifold pressure; RSV: reserve supply valve; RP: reserve pressure; MSV: main supply valve; SP: supply pressure; RGS: reserve gas supply; MGS: main gas supply; UP: umbilical pneumo hose; UB: umbilical breathing gas hose; DP: depth measured by pneumofathometer

A gas panel or gas manifold is the control equipment for supplying the breathing gas to the divers. Primary and reserve gas is supplied to the panel through shutoff valves from a low-pressure compressor or high-pressure storage cylinders ("bombs", "bundles", "quads", or "kellys"). The gas pressure may be controlled at the panel by an industrial pressure regulator, or it may already be regulated closer to the source (at the compressor, or at the storage cylinder outlet). The supply gas pressure is monitored on a gauge at the panel, and an over-pressure valve is fitted in case the supply pressure is too high. The gas panel may be operated by the diving supervisor if the breathing gas is air or a fixed ratio premix, but if the composition must be controlled or monitored during the dive it is usual for a dedicated gas panel operator, or "gas man" to do this work.

There is a set of valves and gauges for each diver to be supplied from the panel. These include:

- A main supply valve with non-return valve, which supplies gas to the main gas supply hose of the umbilical. This is usually a quarter-turn valve, as it must be quick to operate and obvious whether it is open or closed.
- A pneumofathometer supply valve, which supplies gas to the pneumofathometer for the diver. This valve is usually near the main supply valve but with a different handle. It is usually a needle type valve as it must be finely adjustable, but it must also be large enough to allow a fairly high flow rate, as the air may be used as an alternative breathing air source, or to fill small lift bags.
- A pneumofathometer gauge is connected to the pneumo line. This is a high resolution pressure gauge calibrated in feet sea water (fsw) and/or metres sea water (msw). and is used to measure the depth of the diver by allowing air to flow through the pneumo hose and out the end attached to the diver. When the air supply is shut off, and the flow stops, the gauge indicates the pressure at the open end at the diver.
- Each pneumofathometer gauge has an overpressure valve to protect it against gas supply at higher pressure than it is designed to take. This is essential as the main supply pressure is significantly higher than the maximum depth pressure on the pneumo gauge. There is also often a snubbing valve or orifice between the pneumo line and the gauge to restrict flow into the gauge and ensure that the overpressure valve can adequately relieve the pressure.
- Some gas panels have a separate supply gauge for each diver downstream of the supply valve, but this is not standard practice.

The gas panel may be fairly large and mounted on a board for convenience of use, or may be compact and mounted inside a portable box, for ease of transport. Gas panels are usually for one, two or three divers. In some countries, or under some codes of practice, the surface standby diver must be supplied from a separate panel to the working diver/s.

A wet or closed bell will be fitted with a bell gas panel to supply gas to the divers' excursion umbilicals. The bell gas panel is supplied with primary gas from the surface via a bell umbilical, and on-board emergency gas from high-pressure storage cylinders mounted on the frame of the bell.

===== Pneumofathometer =====
A pneumofathometer is a device used to measure the depth of a diver by displaying the back-pressure on a gas supply hose with an open end at the diver, and a flow rate with negligible resistance in the hose. The pressure indicated is the hydrostic pressure at the depth of the open end, and is usually displayed in units of metres or feet of seawater, the same units used for decompression calculations.

The pneumo line is usually a 0.25 inches (6.4 mm) bore hose in the diver's umbilical, supplied with breathing gas from the gas panel via a supply valve. Downstream from the valve there is a branch to a high resolution pressure gauge, a restriction to flow to the gauge, and an overpressure relief valve to protect the gauge from full panel supply pressure in case the pneumo line is used for emergency breathing gas supply. Each diver has an independent pneumofathometer, and if there is a bell, it will also have an independent pneumofathometer.

==== Low-pressure breathing air compressor ====
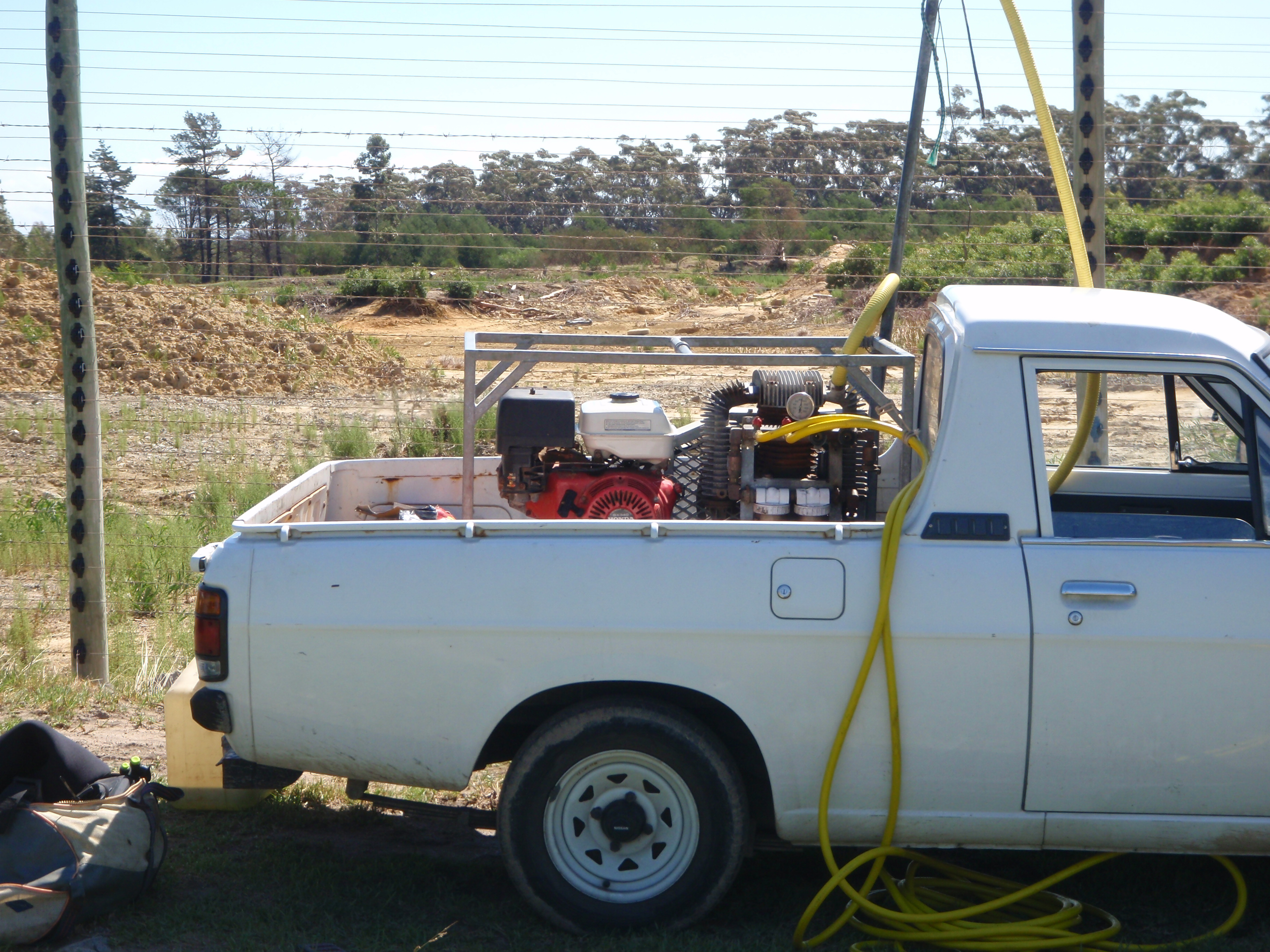
A low-pressure compressor on site providing breathing air for surface-supplied divers

A low-pressure compressor is often the air supply of choice for surface-supplied diving, as it is virtually unlimited in the amount of air it can supply, provided the delivery volume and pressure are adequate for the application. A low-pressure compressor can run for tens of hours, needing only refueling, periodical filter drainage and occasional running checks, and is therefore more convenient than high-pressure storage cylinders for primary air supply.

However, it is critical to diver safety that the compressor is suitable for breathing air delivery, uses a suitable oil, is adequately filtered, and takes in clean and uncontaminated air. Positioning of the intake opening is important, and may have to be changed if the relative wind direction changes, to ensure that no engine exhaust gas enters the intake. Various national standards for breathing air quality may apply.

Power for portable compressors is usually a 4-stroke petrol (gasoline) engine. Larger, trailer mounted compressors, may be diesel powered. Permanently installed compressors on diving support vessels are likely to be powered by 3-phase electric motors.

The compressor should be provided with an accumulator and a relief valve. The accumulator functions as an additional water trap, but the main purpose is to provide a reserve volume of pressurised air. The relief valve allows any excess air to be released back to the atmosphere while retaining the appropriate supply pressure in the accumulator.

==== High pressure main gas supply ====
The main gas supply for surface-supplied diving can be from high pressure bulk storage cylinders. When the storage cylinders are relatively portable this is known as a scuba replacement system in the commercial diving industry. The application is versatile and can ensure high quality breathing gas in places where atmospheric air is too contaminated to use through a normal low pressure compressor filter system, and is easily adaptable to a mixed gas supply and oxygen decompression provided that the breathing apparatus and gas supply system are compatible with the mixtures to be used. Scuba replacement is often used from smaller diving support vessels, for emergency work, and for hazmat diving, where the atmospheric air at the site may be contaminated.

Mixed breathing gases are provided from high pressure bulk storage systems for saturation diving, but these are less portable, and generally involve manifolded racks of cylinders of approximately 50 litres water capacity arranged as quads and even larger racks of high pressure tubes. If gas reclaim systems are used, the reclaimed gas is scrubbed of carbon dioxide, filtered of other contaminants, and recompressed into high pressure cylinders for interim storage, ans is generally blended with oxygen or helium to make up the required mix for the next dive before re-use.

==== Decompression gas ====
Reducing the partial pressure of the inert gas component of the breathing mixture will accelerate decompression as the concentration gradient will be greater for a given depth. This is achieved by increasing the fraction of oxygen in the breathing gas used, whereas substitution of a different inert gas will not produce the desired effect. Any substitution may introduce counter-diffusion complications, owing to differing rates of diffusion of the inert gases, which can lead to a net gain in total dissolved gas tension in a tissue. This can lead to bubble formation and growth, with decompression sickness as a consequence. Partial pressure of oxygen is usually limited to 1.6 bar during in-water decompression for scuba divers, but can be up to 1.9 bar in-water and 2.2 bar in the chamber when using the US Navy tables for surface decompression,

==== High-pressure reserve gas ====
An alternative to a low-pressure compressor for gas supply is high-pressure storage cylinders feeding through a pressure regulator which will be set to the required supply pressure for the depth and equipment in use. In practice HP storage may be used for either reserve gas supply or both main and reserve gas supplies to a gas panel. High-pressure bulk cylinders are quiet in operation and provide gas of known quality (if it has been tested). This allows the relatively simple and reliable use of nitrox mixtures in surface-supplied diving. Bulk cylinders are also quiet in operation compared to a low-pressure compressor, but have the obvious limitation of amount of gas available. The usual configurations for surface-supplied bulk gas storage are large single cylinders of around 50 litres water capacity, often referred to as "J"s or "bombs", "quads", which are a group (sometimes, but not necessarily four in number) of similar cylinders mounted on a frame and connected together to a common supply fitting, and "kellys" which are a group of "tubes" (long large volume pressure vessels) usually mounted in a container frame, and usually connected together to a common connection fitting.

==== Bailout gas supply ====
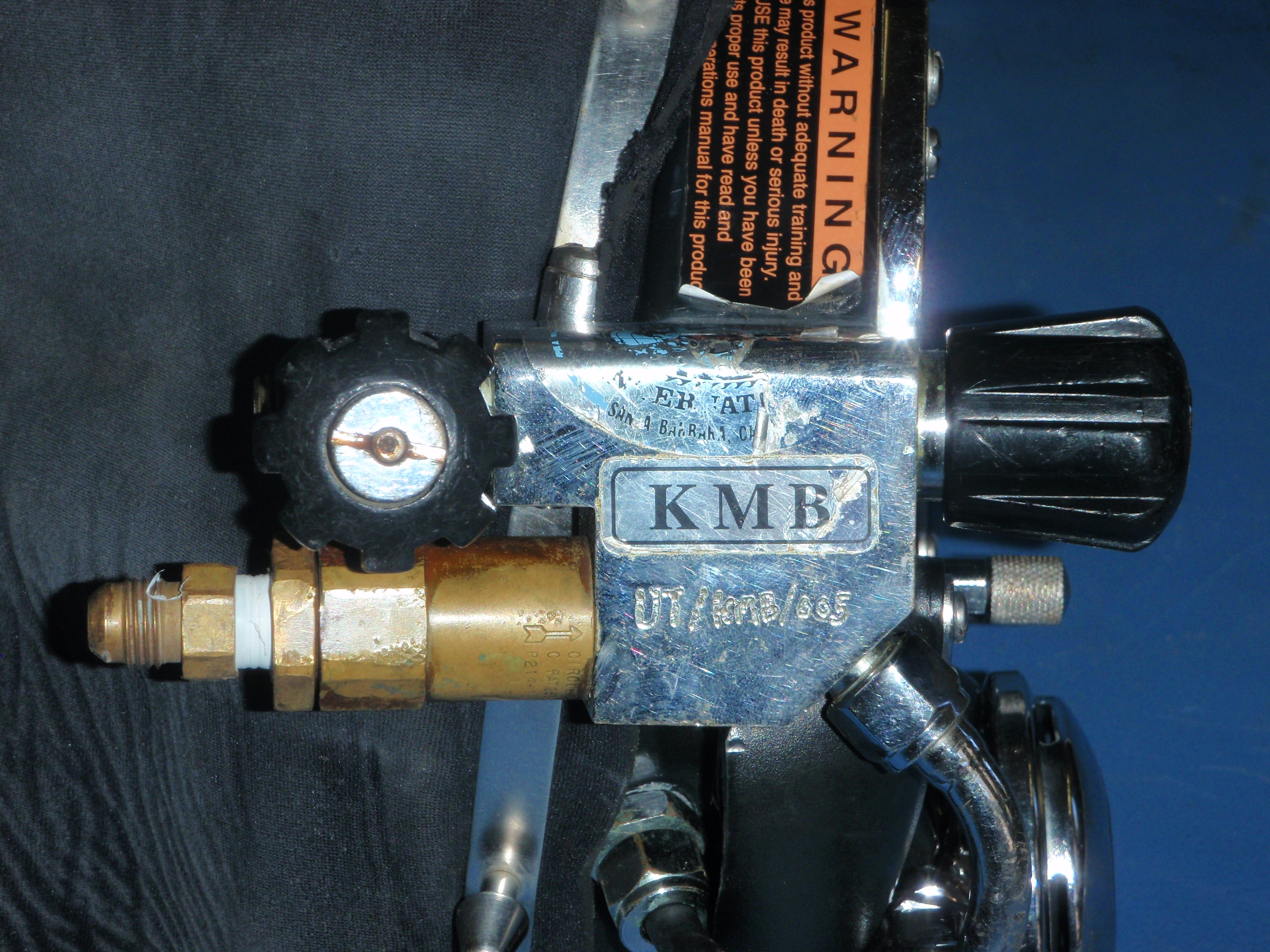
The bailout block on a KM18 band mask, showing the bailout valve (upper left), the non-return valve for main air supply (lower left), and the free-flow valve (right)

Bailout gas is usually carried by the diver in a scuba cylinder, mounted on the back of the harness in the same position as is used with recreational scuba. The size of the cylinder will depend on operational variables. There should be sufficient gas to enable the diver to reach a place of safety on the bailout gas in an emergency. For surface oriented dives, this may require gas for decompression, and bailout sets generally start at about 7 litres internal capacity and can be larger.

Bell diving bailout options: For bell dives there is no requirement for decompression gas, as the bell itself carries bailout gas. However at extreme depths the diver will use gas fast, and there have been cases where twin 10 litre 300 bar sets were required to supply sufficient gas. Another option which has been used for extreme depth is a rebreather bailout set. A limitation for this service is that the diver must be able to get in and out of the bell while wearing the bailout equipment.

Mounting options: The bailout cylinder may be mounted with the valve at the top or at the bottom, depending on local codes of practice. A generally used arrangement is to mount the cylinder with the valve up, as this is better protected while kitting up, and the cylinder valve is left fully open while the diver is in the water. This means that the regulator and supply hose to the bailout block will be pressurised during the dive, and ready for immediate use by opening the bailout valve on the harness or helmet.

The bailout block is a small manifold fitted either to the harness where it is in a convenient but protected position, commonly on the right side on the waist strap, or on the helmet, also usually on the right side of the temple, with the valve knob to the side to distinguish it from the free-flow or defogging valve which is commonly to the front. The bailout block has a connection for the main gas supply from the umbilical through a non-return valve. This route can not be closed and supplies the helmet demand valve and free flow valve under normal circumstances. The bailout gas from the back mounted cylinder passes through a conventional scuba first stage at the cylinder valve, to the bailout block, where it is normally isolated by the bailout valve. When the diver needs to switch over to bailout gas he simply opens the bailout valve and the gas is supplied to the helmet or mask. As the valve is normally closed, a leak in the first stage regulator seat will cause the interstage pressure to rise, and unless an overpressure relief valve is fitted to the first stage the hose may burst. Aftermarket overpressure valves are available which can be fitted into a standard low-pressure port of most first stages.

Bailout supply pressure options: If the interstage pressure for the bailout regulator is lower than the main supply pressure, the main supply will override the bailout gas, and continue to flow. This can be a problem if the diver switches to bailout because main supply is contaminated. If on the other hand, bailout pressure is higher than main supply pressure, the bailout gas will override the main gas supply if the valve is opened. This will result in the bailout gas being used up if the valve leaks. The diver should periodically check that bailout pressure is still sufficient for the rest of the dive, and abort the dive if it is not. For this reason the bailout regulator must be fitted with a submersible pressure gauge to which the diver can refer to check the pressure. This is usually clipped off or tucked into the harness on the left side, where it can be easily reached to read, but is unlikely to snag on anything.

=== Diver's harness ===
The diver's harness is an item of strong webbing, and sometimes cloth, which is fastened around a diver over the exposure suit, and allows the diver to be lifted without risk of falling out of the harness. Several types are in use.

==== Jacket harness ====
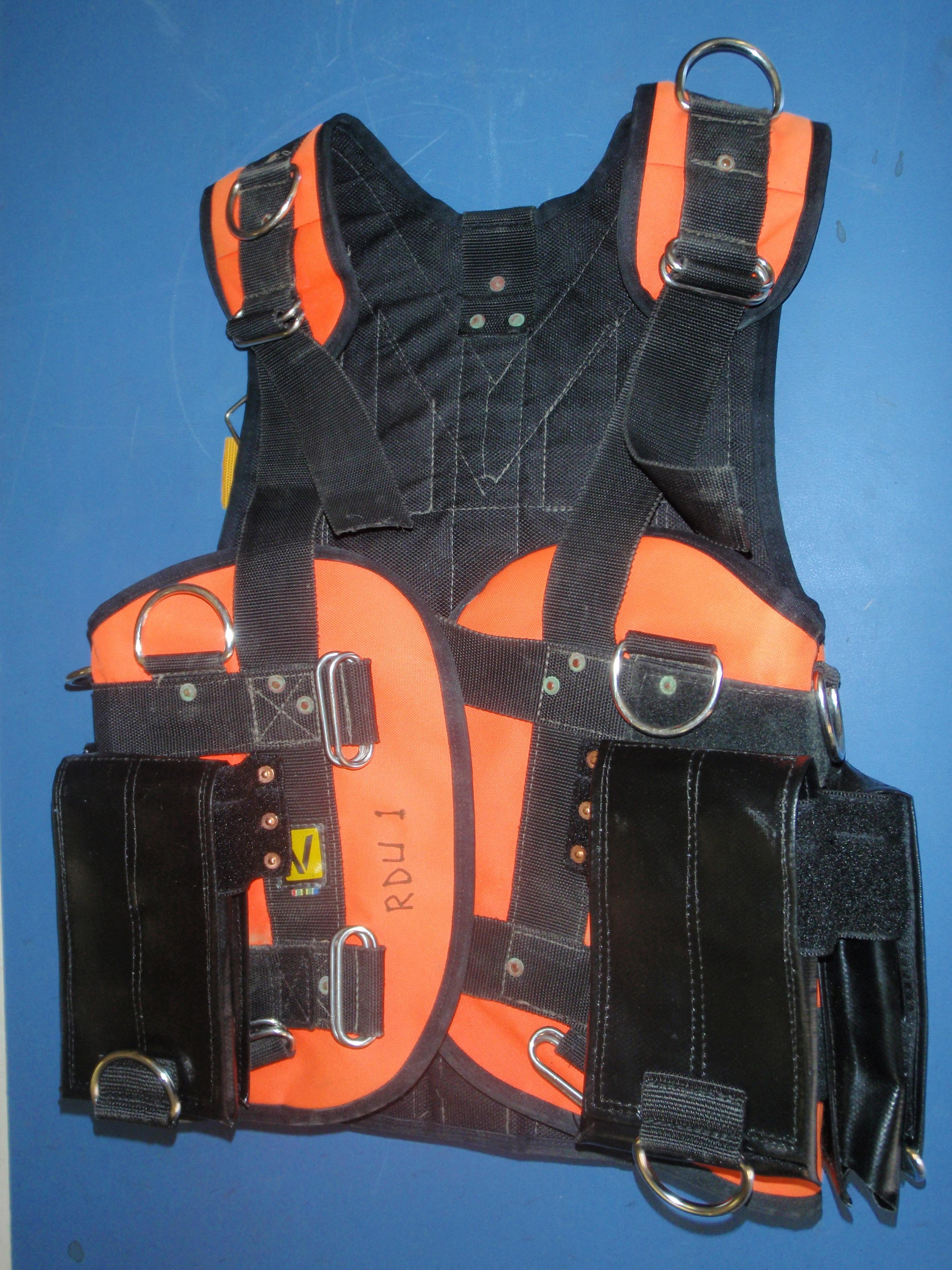
Front view of jacket style diver harness with removable weight pockets

The jacket harness is a waistcoat (vest) style garment with strong adjustable webbing straps which are adjustable and securely buckled over the shoulders, across the chest and waist, and through the crotch or around each thigh, so that the diver can not slide out under any predictable circumstance. The harness is fitted with several heavy duty D-rings, fixed to the webbing in such a way that the full weight of the diver and all his equipment can be safely supported. A minimum strength of 500kgf is recommended or required by some codes of practice. A jacket harness is usually provided with webbing straps or a cloth pocket on the back to support the bailout cylinder, and may have a variety of pockets to carry tools, and may also carry ditchable or fixed main weights. There are usually several strong D-rings to secure the umbilical and other equipment.

==== Bell harness ====
A bell harness has the same function as a jacket harness, but lacks the cloth jacket component, and is made entirely of webbing, with a similar configuration of straps. It too may have a means of carrying a bailout cylinder, or the bailout cylinder may be carried on a separate backpack.

==== Harness with buoyancy compensation ====
The AP Valves Mk4 Jump Jacket is a harness with integral buoyancy jacket specifically designed for commercial diving work with helmets and bells. There is a direct feed to the jacket from the main air supply, from the pneumo line and from bailout, and a system which allows the diver's pneumo to be directly connected to another diver's helmet as an emergency air supply.

==== Buoyancy control ====
Surface-supplied divers may be required to work in mid-water or on the bottom. They must be able to stay down without effort, and this usually requires weighting. When working in mid-water the diver may wish to be neutrally buoyant or negative, and when working on the bottom he will usually want to be several kilos negative. The only time the diver may want to be positively buoyant is when on the surface or during a limited range of emergencies where uncontrolled ascent is less life-threatening than remaining under water. Surface-supplied divers generally have a secure supply of breathing gas, and there are very few occasions where weights should be jettisoned, so in most cases the surface-supplied diver weighting arrangement does not provide for quick release.

On those occasions when surface supplied divers need variable buoyancy, it may be provided by inflation of the dry suit, if used, or by a buoyancy control device similar in principle to those used by scuba divers, or both.

=== Weight systems ===
The diver needs to stay on the bottom to work some of the time, and may need to have neutral buoyancy some of the time. The diving suit is usually buoyant, so added weight is usually necessary. This can be provided in several ways. Unwanted positive buoyancy is dangerous to a diver who may need to spend significant time decompressing during the ascent, so the weights are usually attached securely to prevent accidental loss.

==== Weight belts ====
Weight belts for surface supplied diving are usually provided with buckles which can not accidentally be released, and the weight belt is often worn under the jacket harness.

==== Weight harnesses ====
When large amounts of weight are needed, a harness may be used to carry the load on the diver's shoulders, rather than around the waist, where it may tend to slip down into an uncomfortable position if the diver is working in a vertical posture, which is often the case. Sometimes this is a separate harness, worn under the safety harness, with pockets at the sides to carry the weights, and sometimes it is an integrated system, which carries the weight in pockets built into or externally attached to the safety harness.

==== Trim weights ====
If the diver needs to adjust trim for greater comfort and efficiency while working, trim weights of various types may be added to the harness.

==== Weighted boots ====
Weighted boots of several styles may be used if the diver will be working heavy. Some are in the form of clogs which strap on over the boots, and others use lead inner soles. Ankle weights are also an option, but less comfortable. These weights give the diver better stability when working upright on the bottom, which can significantly improve productivity for some kinds of work.

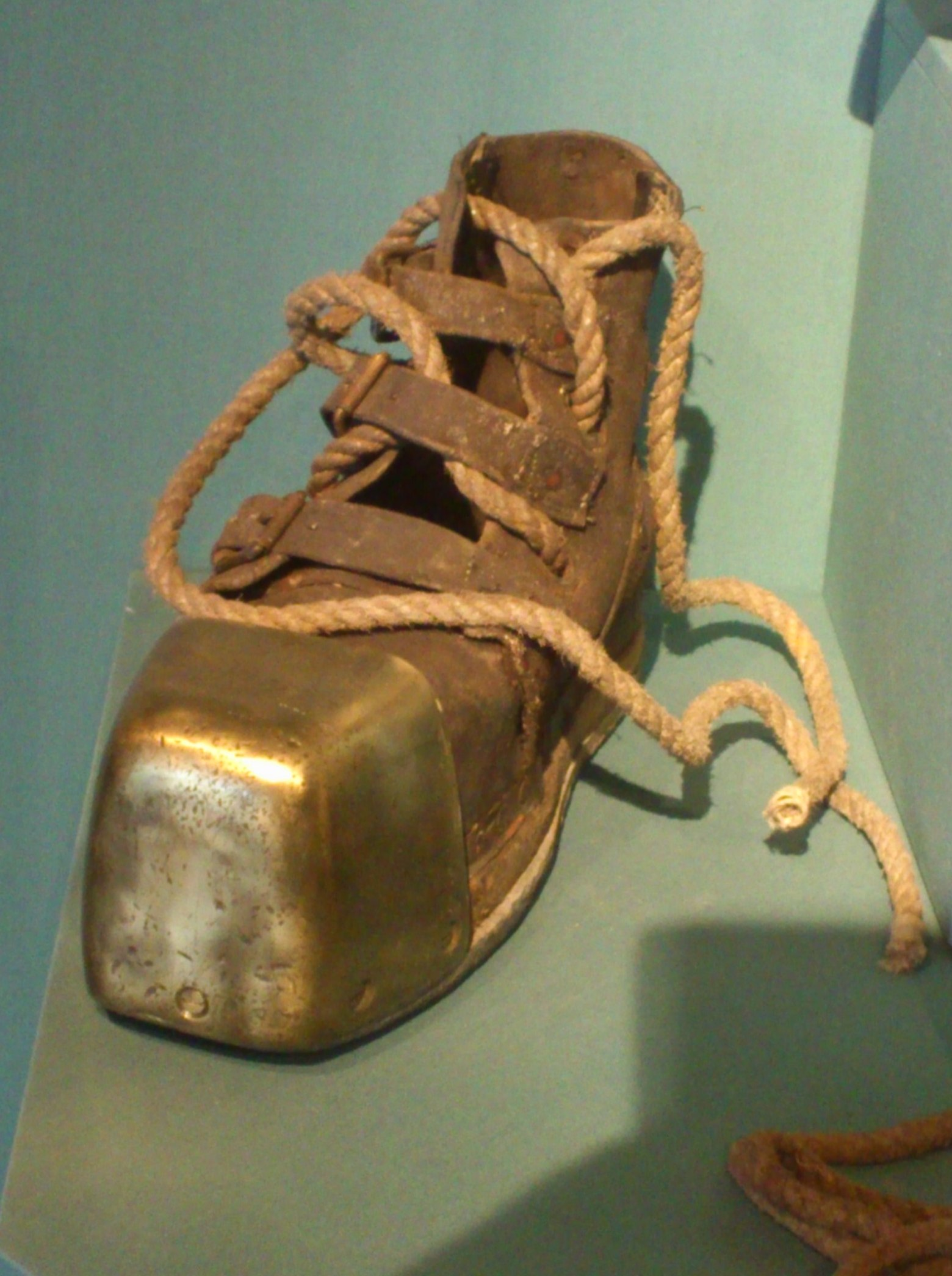
Diver's boot on display at the Aberdeen Maritime Museum

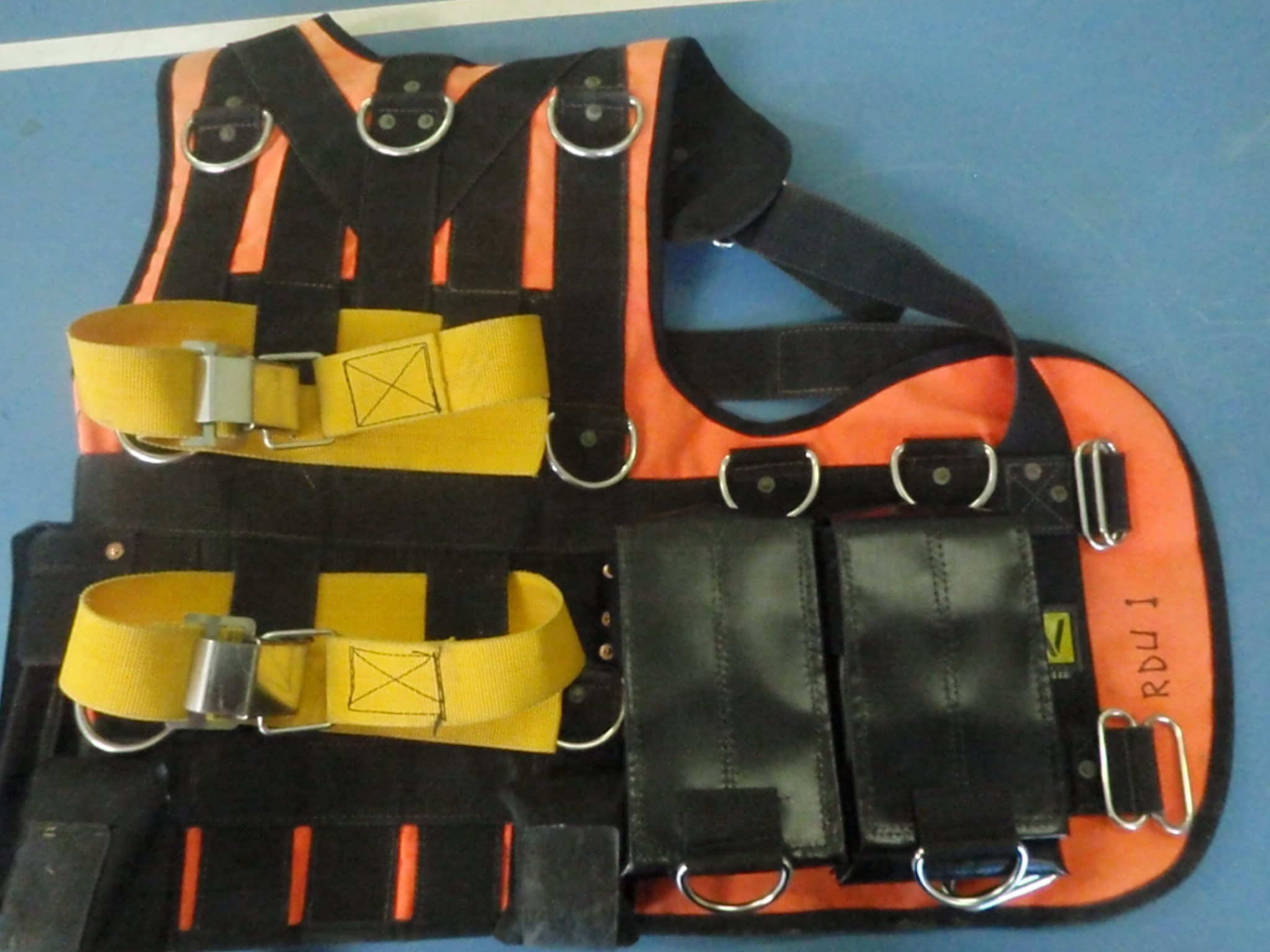
A diver's safety harness of the jacket type with removable weight pockets, showing the bailout cylinder straps and the webbing strength members with heavy duty D-rings

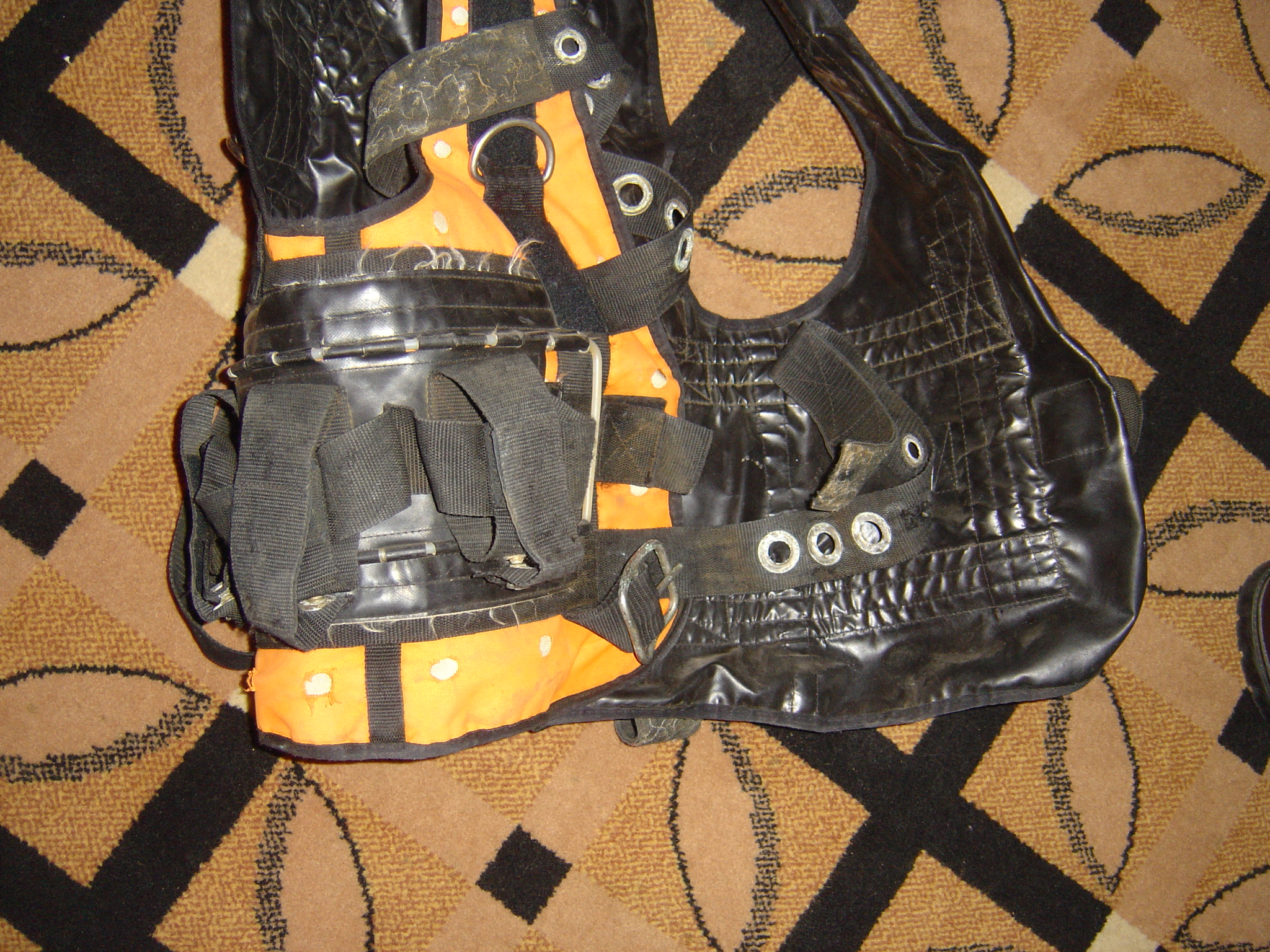
A jacket style diving safety harness with a different ditchable weight system on the side

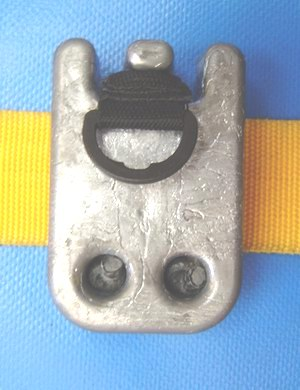
Clip on trim weights may be attached to the harness webbing to adjust the position of centre of gravity to improve trim

=== Environmental protection ===
Wetsuits are economical and used where the water temperature is not too low - more than about 65 °F (18 °C), the diver will not be spending too long in the water, and the water is reasonably clean.

Dry suits are better thermal protection than most wetsuits, and isolate the diver from the environment more effectively than other exposure suits. When diving in contaminated water, a drysuit with integral boots, sealed dry gloves and a helmet sealed directly to the suit provides the best environmental isolation. The suit material must be selected to be compatible with the expected contaminants. Thermal undersuits can be matched to the expected water temperature.

Hot water suits provide active warming which is particularly suitable for use with helium based breathing gases. Heated water is provided from the surface through a hose in the umbilical, and water flow can be adjusted to suit the diver's needs. Heated water continuously flows into the suit and is distributed by perforated internal tubes down the front and back of the torso and along the limbs.

The hot water supply hose of the umbilical is commonly 1/2 inch (13 mm) bore, and is connected to a supply manifold at the right hip of the suit with a set of valves which allow the diver to control flow to the front and back of the torso, and to the arms and legs, and to dump the supply to the environment if the water is too hot or too cold. The manifold distributes the water through the suit through perforated tubes. The hot-water suit is normally a one-piece neoprene wetsuit, fairly loose fitting, to fit over a neoprene undersuit, which can protect the diver from scalding if the temperature control system fails, with a zipper on the front of the torso and on the lower part of each leg. Gloves and boots are worn which receive hot water from the ends of the arm and leg hoses. If a full-face mask is worn, the hood may be supplied by a tube at the neck of the suit. Helmets do not require heating. The heating water flows out at the neck and cuffs of the suit through the overlap with gloves, boots, or hood.

=== Communications system ===
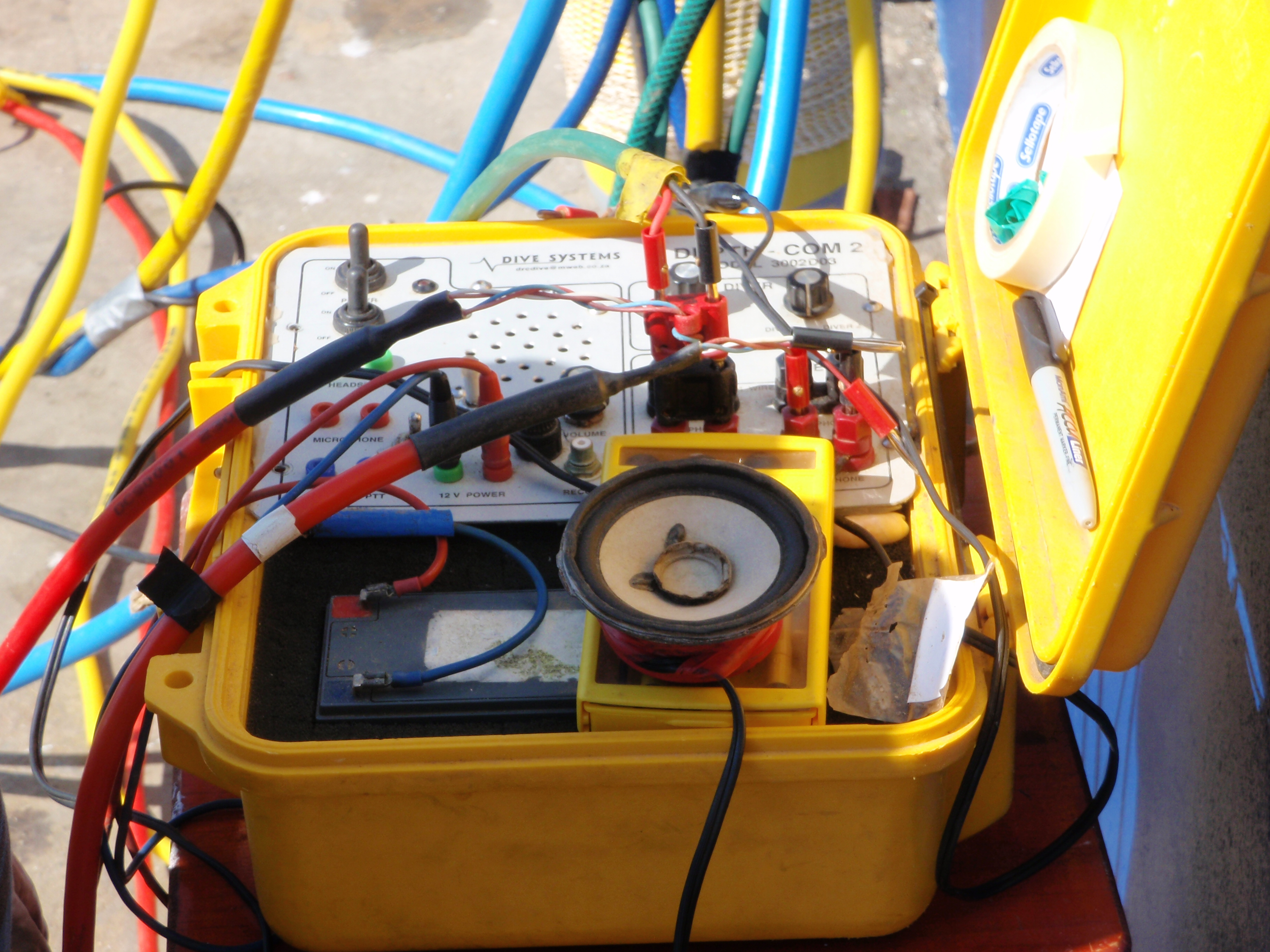
A hard-wired diver communications unit mounted in a waterproof box for convenience of transport and protection. The loose speaker has been added to increase output volume. there is a built in speaker behind the perforations on the panel

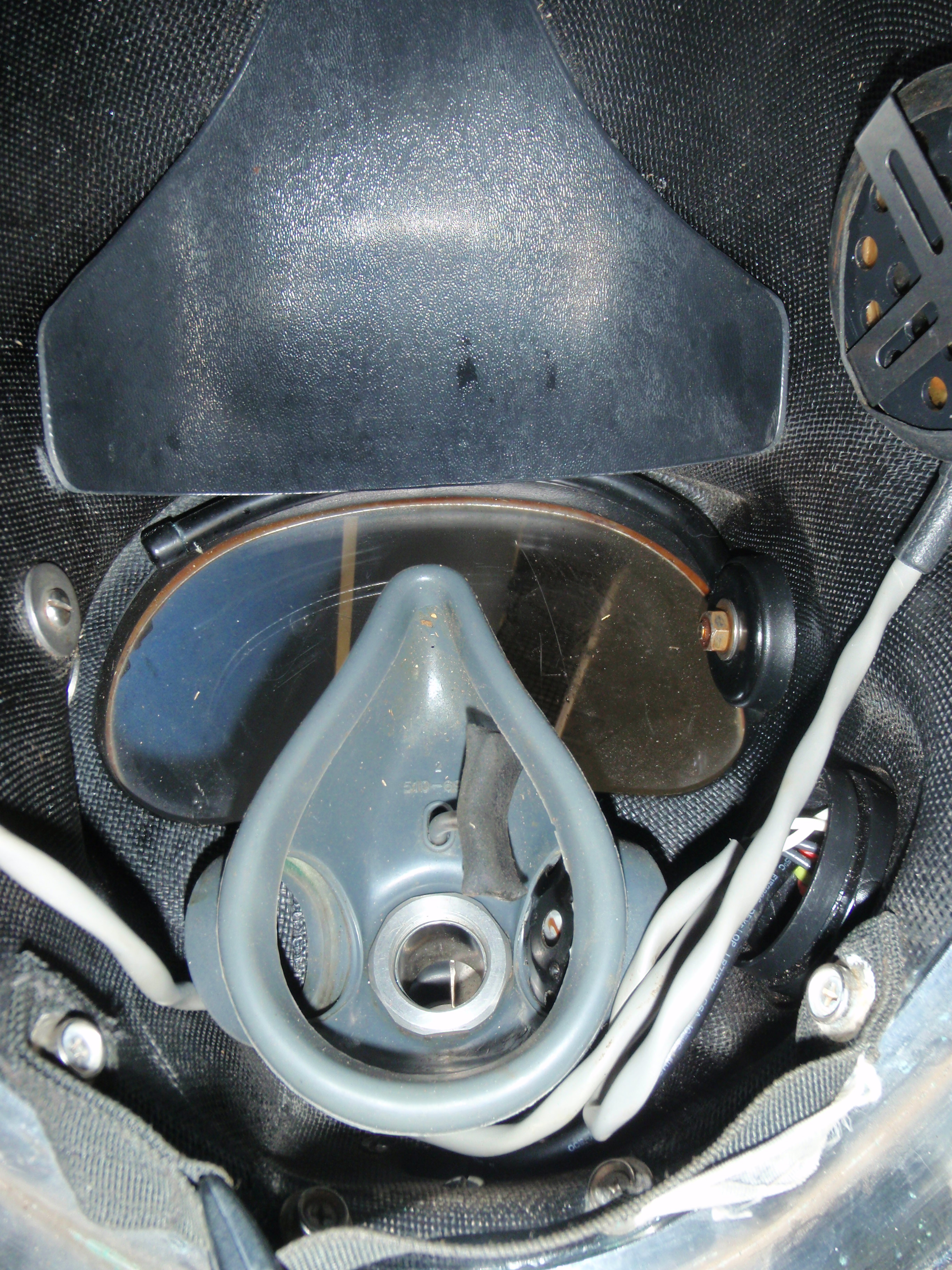
Inside a Kirby Morgan 37 helmet showing the microphone in the oro-nasal mask, and one of the speakers at the top of the photo

Both hard-wired (cable) and through-water electronic voice communications systems may be used with surface-supplied diving. Wired systems are more popular as there is a physical connection to the diver for gas supply in any case, and adding a cable does not change the handling characteristics of the system. Wired communications systems are still more reliable and simpler to maintain than through-water systems.

==== Diver's telephone ====
The communications equipment is relatively straightforward and may be of the two-wire or four-wire type. Two wire systems use the same wires for surface to diver and diver to surface messages, whereas four wire systems allow the diver's messages and the surface operator's messages to use separate wire pairs.

In a two wire system the standard arrangement for diver communications is to have the diver's side normally on, so that the surface team can hear anything from the diver at all times except when the surface is sending a message. In a four-wire system the diver's side is always on, even when the surface operator is talking. This is considered an important safety feature, as the surface team can monitor the diver's breathing sounds, which can give early warning of problems developing, and confirms that the diver is alive.

Helium divers may need a decoder system (unscrambler) which reduces the frequency of the sound to make it more intelligible.

==== Video ====
Closed circuit video has also become popular, as this allows the surface personnel to see what the diver is doing, which is particularly useful for inspection work, as a non-diving specialist can see the underwater equipment in real time and direct the diver to look at particular features of interest. Closed circuit video is usually helmet mounted along with a helmet mounted video light.

==== Wireless systems ====
Dry bells may have a through-water (wireless) communication system fitted as a backup. This is intended to provide communications in the event that the cable is damaged, or even if the bell is completely severed from the umbilical and deployment cables.

== Equipment maintenance and testing ==
All components of a surface supplied diving system are required to be maintained in good working condition for diver safety, and may be required to be tested or calibrated at specified intervals.

== Diving spread ==
The diving spread is a commercial diving term for the topside dive site infrastructure supporting the diving operations for a diving project. The diving contractor provides the diving and support equipment and sets it up on site, usually at a place provided for the purpose by the client, or on a diving support vessel. Two types of diving spread are in common use: Air spreads for surface oriented diving operations, where the divers are deployed from normal atmospheric pressure, and decompressed back to atmospheric pressure at the end of the dive, either in-water, or in a chamber for surface decompression, using compressed air as the primary breathing gas, and saturation spreads, where divers are deployed under pressure from the saturation accommodation via a closed diving bell to the underwater worksite, and returned under pressure in the bell to the saturation accommodation system, usually breathing a helium based gas mixture. At the end of their contract the divers are decompressed to surface pressure. The process of selecting, transporting, setting up and testing the equipment is the mobilisation stage of the project, and the demobilisation involves dismantling, transportation and return to storage of the spread components.

Surface oriented mixed gas diving spreads may also be used, but are less common, and are likely to be associated with projects which are too deep for air but require only a short working time at depth.

=== Air spread ===
An air spread will include the breathing air supply equipment, and often a deck decompression chamber. Where a chamber is present, facilities for hyperbaric oxygen treatment are usually required. If the planned decompression is to be long, a diving stage or bell and the associated handling equipment is likely to be included to allow better control of ascent rate and decompression depth. Equipment for in-water or surface decompression on oxygen (SurDO_{2}) may be available.

Equipment may be necessary to facilitate safe entry to and exit from the water, and may include extrication equipment in case the diver is injured. A basic offshore air diving spread will typically include a dive control unit with compressor and high pressure storage banks, a launch and recovery system with a wet bell, a deck decompression chamber and a hot water unit.

=== Saturation spread ===
A saturation spread will include the closed bell and launch and recovery system, saturation habitat, breathing gas supplies and services, all the life support and control equipment, dive equipment stores and workshops, and may also include power supplies and other equipment not directly involved in the diving. It does not include the diving platform as such, for example a DP vessel, or offshore drilling rig, on which the spread is established, or other services such as catering and accommodation for the topside personnel, which would usually be provided to the dive team.

== Diving procedures ==
There are a large number of standard procedures associated with surface-supplied diving. Some of these have their equivalents in scuba, and others are very different. Many procedures are common to all surface-supplied diving, others are specific to stage and bell operations or to saturation diving. Details will vary depending on the equipment used, as manufacturers will specify some checks and procedures in detail, and the order may vary to some extent.

=== The working diver ===
Preparation of the working diver for the dive is very much a routine, but details depend on the diving equipment and the task, and to some extent on the site, particularly aspects of accessibility.

==== Preparation for diving ====
Before a diving operation it is usually necessary to set up the surface supply equipment. There are a number of components which must be connected in the correct order, with checks at various stages to ensure that there are no leaks and everything functions correctly. Most diving contractors will have comprehensive checklists that are used to ensure that the equipment is connected in the appropriate sequence and all checks are done. Some checks are critical to the safety of the diver. The compressor must be set up so that it gets uncontaminated air to the intake. Filters should be checked in case they need to be changed. Air supply hoses will be connected to the air panel and checked for leaks, umbilicals connected to the panels and helmets, and the communications equipment connected and tested. Before the umbilical is connected to the helmet or full face mask, the umbilical should be blown through to ensure there is no dirt inside, and the non return valve on the bailout block must be given a function test. This is important, as it is there to prevent backflow of air up the umbilical if the line is cut, and if it fails the diver may suffer a helmet squeeze, or a neck dam flood.

Compared to scuba diving, dressing the diver in (Note: Dressing the diver in is surface-supplied diving terminology.) is a relatively laborious process, as the equipment is bulky and fairly heavy, and several components are connected together by hoses. This is more so with helmets, and less so with light full-face masks. It is not usual for the diver to do all the dressing in without the assistance of a diver's tender, who will also manage the umbilical during the dive.

- Exposure suit – The diver will wear an exposure suit appropriate for the planned dive time, breathing gas and water temperature, and also influenced by the level of exertion expected during the dive.
- Harness – After putting on the exposure suit and checking any seals and zips, the diver will put on the harness. The topside crew will usually help as the bailout cylinder will be already mounted, and usually also attached to the helmet, making this a cumbersome procedure, easiest if the diver is seated.
- Weights – The weights will be put onto the diver at some time during the dressing procedure, but the stage where this is done depends on what weighting system is used.
- Bailout – The bailout cylinder is usually strapped to the harness and connected to the helmet before the diver is dressed in.
- Helmet – The helmet is usually put on last, as it is heavy and uncomfortable out of the water. Some divers can put on their own helmet, but it is usual for the topside crew to do most of the locking on to the neck dam, and check that there are no obvious faults with the seal.

There are a series of pre-dive checks which are done after the diver is locked into the helmet, and before he is committed to the water. These should be done every time a diver is prepared for a dive.

- Comms check – The diver and comms operator check that the voice communications system is working both ways and they can hear each other clearly. This also ensures that the operator is sure which comms channel connects to the specific diver.
- Breathing checks – The diver breathes on main air supply to ensure that the demand valve is delivering gas at low work of breathing, without free flow, and that the umbilical is connected to the correct valve on the panel.
- Bailout checks – The diver operates the bailout system to ensure that he can reach and operate the valve and it turns smoothly, the pressure in the cylinder is adequate for the planned dive profile and is ready for immediate use, and reports bailout readiness to the supervisor by "On at the tap, off at the hat, Pressure...bar" or equivalent.

Surface checks are done after the diver enters the water, but before he is allowed to descend. They are checks which can not be done as effectively, or at all, in air.

- Wet comms check – Once in the water, the comms should be checked again to make sure it is still working adequately. It is possible that water will cause the comms to fail or deteriorate when the contacts get wet.
- Helmet seal – The helmet seals and neckdam should not allow water to enter the helmet. This can only be checked when in the water.
- Pneumo bubbles – The diver calls for the air panel operator to open the pneumofathometer valve to check that the line is not blocked, and that it is connected to the correct place on the panel.

==== Diving heavy ====
The traditional buoyancy condition of the working surface-supplied diver is "heavy", or negatively buoyant, with sufficient apparent weight to move around on the bottom by walking. This was more important with the standard diving dress, where inadvertent positive buoyancy could have fatal consequences if poorly managed and degraded to an uncontrolled buoyant ascent. Diving heavy has advantages for working when there is good footing, as the diver has more natural resistance to the reaction forces on tools used and to light currents, due to friction and ground reaction, so the technique remains popular for many tasks.

The technique virtually eliminates the risk of uncontrolled buoyant ascent, and reduces task loading, but makes the diver dependent on umbilical management or a jackstay for depth control in midwater and introduces a risk of accidental descent to unplanned depths by falling off the substrate and sinking until the slack in the umbilical is taken up, but with an adequate gas supply the risk of serious squeeze injury is low.

==== Emergency procedures ====
The diver must be able to deal with the following emergencies. Some are life-threatening, whereas others are more inconveniences.

- Bailout to back gas, in the case of a failure of gas supply from the umbilical, or if the main air supply is contaminated.
- Pneumo breathing, if the main air supply is cut, but the pneumo hose is intact. Pneumo gas can also be supplied by the standby diver
- Voice communications failure is not usually an emergency, but can adversely affect work effectiveness and expose the diver to higher risk if anything else goes wrong. Ability to communicate with line signals can help here, particularly to assist in the decision whether the dive should be aborted, and if there are other more urgent problems.
- Helmet flood. Depending on the severity of the flood, this can range from an annoyance to an emergency. A slow leak can be controlled by opening the free flow valve, which will drive a moderate flow of water out of the exhaust valve. A neck dam failure usually has this effect.
- Broken faceplate. This is a real emergency, but very unlikely as the faceplate is usually a highly impact-resistant polymer and should not shatter. It can be mitigated by opening the free flow valve and holding the opening level, facing down, and breathing very carefully. A small hole or crack can be covered with a hand to slow the leak.
- Demand valve failure. This is a minor problem if there is a free flow valve, but the dive will normally be terminated, as the bailout will not last long if needed.
- Exhaust valve failure, like demand valve failure, can be dealt with by opening the free flow valve and ensuring a constant outflow of air.
- Vomiting in the helmet. This can be a real emergency and life-threatening in a demand helmet with an orinasal mask if not handled effectively, as the diver can aspirate the vomit and asphyxiate. Once again, the action is to open the free flow valve, preferably before vomiting, and to inhale as carefully as possible. If there is no free flow valve, as on a full face mask, the purge button should clear the demand valve and orinasal mask, and the mask can be rinsed by lifting the bottom edge away from the face to let in some water, before purging again. With a free-flow helmet it is more a nuisance than an emergency.
- Hot water supply failure. This can be life-threatening for deep heliox diving, and there is not much the diver can do but head back to the bell immediately.

==== Wet bell and stage emergency procedures ====
Emergency procedures for wet bell and diving stages include:

- Loss of main gas supply to the bell
- Recovery of a distressed diver to the bell
- Abandonment of the bell or stage
- Deployment of a surface standby diver
- Loss of heated water supply for hot water suits
- Voice communications failures
- Dynamic positioning alarm and runout response for bell divers: Yellow and Red alerts.

=== Standby diver ===
The standby diver will be prepared in the same way as the working diver, but will not enter the water until needed. He will usually be prepared to the stage of readiness to enter the water, and then will remove his mask, or have his helmet removed and will then sit in as comfortable a place as can be found, so that in case of an emergency he can be readied for action in as short a time as possible. This often means setting up some form of shelter from the weather, and heat and sunshine are usually more of a problem than cold and wet. It is frequently necessary to cool the standby diver to avoid overheating, and dehydration can also be a problem. When the working diver is using a helmet, the stand-by diver may use a full face mask or bandmask, as this makes it quicker to get into the water in an emergency. The stand-by diver's job is to wait until something goes wrong, and then be sent in to sort it out. For this reason a stand by diver should be one of the best divers on the team regarding diving skills and strength, but does not have to be expert at the work skills for the specific job. When deployed, the standby diver will normally follow the umbilical of the diver who is in trouble, as unless it has been severed, it will reliably lead to the correct diver. The standby diver must maintain communications with the supervisor throughout the dive and is expected to give a running commentary of progress so that the supervisor and surface crew know as much as possible what is happening and can plan accordingly, and must take the necessary steps to resolve incidents, which may involve supply of emergency air or locating and rescuing an injured or unconscious diver. In bell diving, the bellman is the primary standby diver, and may have to recover a distressed diver to the bell and give first aid if necessary and possible. There will generally also be a surface standby diver in a bell operation, as some types of assistance are provided from the surface.

A rescue tether or rescue strop is a short length of rope or webbing with a clip at one or both ends, which the stand-by diver uses to clip the unresponsive diver to his harness to free up both hands during a recovery. This can be useful if he needs to climb a structure, shotline or topographical feature, and the umbilicals can not be safely used to lift the divers due to snags or sharp edges.

=== Bellman ===
A bellman is a stand-by diver who tends the working diver's umbilical from a wet or closed bell, and is ready to go to the diver's assistance at all times. The bellman must be in effective voice communication with the supervisor.

=== Underwater tending point ===
For some operations it is necessary to control the umbilical at a point underwater. This is known as an underwater tending point, and it may be done by another diver or by the diver passing through a closed fairlead placed in the required position. This is usually done to prevent inadvertent access to a known hazard by making the length of the umbilical extending beyond the tending point too short to let the diver get to the hazard. The fairlead must constrain the umbilical laterally and vertically, while allowing free passage away from and back to the bell or stage, and should not interfere with the bellman's ability to pay out or take up slack when the diver travels to the workplace and back. It may be held in position by suspending a weighted hoop from a crane, resting a frame on the bottom, or other methods as may suit the job. Underwater tending may also be used for penetrations of enclosed spaces, such as wrecks, caves, penstocks, sewers, culverts and the like. A diving stage or basket is a by default an underwater tending point, as the umbilical passes through it from the surface to the diver, which also serves as a guide line for the diver to get back to the stage. A diving bell is also an underwater tending point, as the excursion umbilical is tended from the bell by the bellman.

== Occupational health and safety issues ==
Divers face specific physical and health risks when they go underwater with diving equipment, or use high pressure breathing gas.

A hazard is any agent or situation that poses a level of threat to life, health, property, or environment. Most hazards remain dormant or potential, with only a theoretical risk of harm, and when a hazard becomes active, and produces undesirable consequences, it is called an incident and may culminate in an emergency or accident. Hazard and vulnerability interact with likelihood of occurrence to create risk, which can be the probability of a specific undesirable consequence of a specific hazard, or the combined probability of undesirable consequences of all the hazards of a specific activity. A hazard that is understood and acknowledged may present a lower risk if appropriate precautions are taken, and the consequences may be less severe if mitigation procedures are planned and in place.

The presence of a combination of several hazards simultaneously is common in diving, and the effect is generally increased risk to the diver, particularly where the occurrence of an incident due to one hazard triggers other hazards with a resulting cascade of incidents. Many diving fatalities are the result of a cascade of incidents overwhelming the diver, who should be able to manage any single reasonably foreseeable incident. The use of surface supplied breathing gas reduces one of the most significant hazards in diving, that of loss of breathing gas supply, and mitigates that risk by the use of a suitable emergency gas supply, usually in the form of a scuba bailout set, which is intended to provide the diver with sufficient breathing gas to reach a place of relative safety with more breathing gas available.

The risk of the diver getting lost or being unable to call for assistance is also drastically reduced in comparison with most scuba, as the diver is physically connected to the surface control point by the umbilical, making it relatively simple for the standby diver to get to a diver in distress, and the standard application of hard-wired voice communications allows the surface team to constantly monitor the diver's breathing sounds.

The assessed risk of a dive would generally be considered unacceptable if the diver is not expected to cope with any single reasonably foreseeable incident with a significant probability of occurrence during that dive. Precisely where the line is drawn depends on circumstances. Professional diving operations tend to be less tolerant of risk than recreational, particularly technical divers, who are less constrained by occupational health and safety legislation and codes of practice. This is one of the factors driving the use of surface supplied equipment where reasonably practicable for professional work.

Diving disorders are medical conditions specifically arising from underwater diving. The signs and symptoms of these may present during a dive, on surfacing, or up to several hours after a dive. Surface supplied divers have to breathe a gas which is at the same pressure as their surroundings (ambient pressure), which can be much greater than on the surface. The ambient pressure underwater increases by 1 standard atmosphere (100 kPa) for every 10 metres (33 ft) of depth.

The principal disorders are: decompression illness (which covers decompression sickness and arterial gas embolism); nitrogen narcosis; high pressure nervous syndrome; oxygen toxicity; and pulmonary barotrauma (burst lung). Although some of these may occur in other settings, they are of particular concern during diving activities. Long term diving disorders include dysbaric osteonecrosis, which is associated with decompression sickness. These disorders are caused by breathing gas at the high pressures encountered at depth, and divers may breathe a gas mixture different from air to mitigate these effects. Nitrox, which contains more oxygen and less nitrogen, is commonly used as a breathing gas to reduce the risk of decompression sickness at depths to about 40 metres (130 ft). Helium may be added to reduce the amount of nitrogen and oxygen in the gas mixture when diving deeper, to reduce the effects of narcosis and to avoid the risk of oxygen toxicity. This is complicated at depths beyond about 150 metres (500 ft), because a helium–oxygen mixture (heliox) then causes high pressure nervous syndrome. More exotic mixtures such as hydreliox, a hydrogen–helium–oxygen mixture, are used at extreme depths to counteract this.

== Compressor diving ==
"Compressor diving" is a method of surface-supplied diving used in some tropical sea areas including the Philippines and the Caribbean. The divers swim with a half mask covering the eyes and nose and (often home-made) fins and are supplied air from the boat by plastic hoses from an industrial low-pressure air compressor of the type commonly used to supply jackhammers. There is no reduction valve; the diver holds the hose end in his mouth with no demand valve or mouthpiece. Excess air spills out through the nose or lips. If several people are compressor diving from the same boat, several line tenders are needed in the boat to stop the airlines from getting tangled and blocked by kinks.

Compressor diving is the most common method used to fish for Caribbean spiny lobster (Panulirus argus) in the Caribbean. However, it is illegal because it contributes to overfishing, is environmentally destructive, and is harmful to the health of the fishermen. When using compressors, fishermen use either gaffs or harpoons to spear lobsters immediately upon sight, killing or injuring the lobsters before they can be checked for eggs or assessed as legally sized. Compressors allow fishermen to remain in deeper waters for longer periods of time, facilitating reef damage by fishermen seeking lobsters hidden underneath corals and other living refuges. The misuse of compressors has also resulted in health problems for many fishermen, such as respiratory problems, limb paralysis, and death due to decompression illness.

This method of diving is commonly used in Philippine waters for pa-aling fishing, which is fishing with big nets on coral reef areas where a surface-dragged net would snag on coral; the compressor air hoses are also used to make a curtain of bubbles to corral and herd the fish into the nets, since muro-ami fishing was stopped in the area. At least one pa-aling fishing fleet has been found and arrested in a protected fishery area. Compressor diving was shown, and so called, used for pa-aling fishing, in episode 1 (Oceans: Into the Blue) of the BBC television series Human Planet. The cameramen used ordinary scuba gear, but one of them had a trial-dive with the crew's compressor-diving gear.

== Training and registration ==
Almost all surface-supplied diving is done by professional divers, and consequently the training is done by schools which specialise in the training of professional divers. Registration of professional divers is generally subject to national or state legislation, though international recognition is available for some qualifications.

== See also ==
- Atmospheric diving suit – Articulated pressure-resistant anthropomorphic housing for an underwater diver
- Diver's pump – Manually powered surface air supply for divers
- Diving bell – Chamber for transporting divers vertically through the water
- Diving chamber – Hyperbaric pressure vessel for human occupancy used in diving operations
- Diving helmet – Rigid head enclosure for underwater diving
- Freediving – Underwater diving without breathing apparatus
- Recreational diving – Diving for the purpose of leisure and enjoyment
- Saturation diving – Diving mode and decompression technique
- Scuba diving – Swimming underwater, breathing gas carried by the diver
- Snuba – Limited depth airline breathing apparatus towed by the diver
- Standard diving dress – Copper helmet with rubberised canvas diving suit and weighted boots
