= Bounce diving =

Bounce diving, in the context of underwater diving, may refer to:

- In surface supplied diving, surface oriented diving, where the breathing gas is supplied from the surface, and the dive starts and ends at surface atmospheric pressure,
  - In bell bounce diving the diver is transported to and from the underwater workplace in a closed diving bell or lock-out submersible, and decompressed to surface pressure after the dive, without the use of saturation techniques.
- In recreational diving, Dive profile#Bounce profile, where the diver descends directly to maximum depth, remains there for a short bottom time, and ascends directly to the surface with any necessary decompression, but commonly without obligatory decompression,.
- In New Zealand occupational diving, Dive profile#Bounce profile, "repetitive diving to depths shallower than 21 m with less than 15 minutes surface interval between consecutive dives"
