= Gas blending =

Producing special gas mixtures to specification

Gas blending is the process of mixing gases for a specific purpose where the composition of the resulting mixture is defined, and therefore, controlled. A wide range of applications include scientific and industrial processes, food production and storage and breathing gases.

Gas mixtures are usually specified in terms of molar gas fraction (which is closely approximated by volumetric gas fraction for many permanent gases): by percentage, parts per thousand or parts per million. Volumetric gas fraction converts trivially to partial pressure ratio, following Dalton's law of partial pressures. Partial pressure blending at constant temperature is computationally simple, and pressure measurement is relatively inexpensive, but maintaining constant temperature during pressure changes requires significant delays for temperature equalization. Blending by mass fraction is unaffected by temperature variation during the process, but requires accurate measurement of mass or weight, and calculation of constituent masses from the specified molar ratio. Both partial pressure and mass fraction blending are used in practice.

== Applications ==
=== Shielding gases for welding ===
Tungsten inert gas welding

Shielding gases are inert or semi-inert gases used in gas metal arc welding and gas tungsten arc welding to protect the weld area from oxygen and water vapour, which can reduce the quality of the weld or make the welding more difficult.

Gas metal arc welding (GMAW), or metal inert gas (MIG) welding, is a process that uses a continuous wire feed as a consumable electrode and an inert or semi-inert gas mixture to protect the weld from contamination. Gas tungsten arc welding (GTAW), or tungsten inert gas (TIG) welding, is a manual welding process that uses a nonconsumable tungsten electrode, an inert or semi-inert gas mixture, and a separate filler material.

=== Modified atmosphere packaging in the food industry ===
Modified atmosphere packaging preserves fresh produce to improve delivered quality of the product and extend its life. The gas composition used to pack food products depends on the product. A high oxygen content helps to retain the red colour of meat, while low oxygen reduces mould growth in bread and vegetables. Industry guidance summarises common MAP gases and application methods (e.g., flushing or in-line injection); FAO documents provide general principles, while manufacturer application notes illustrate typical gases and supply arrangements used in practice.

=== Gas mixtures for brewing ===
- Sparging: An inert gas such as nitrogen is bubbled through the wine, which removes the dissolved oxygen. Carbon dioxide is also removed and to ensure that an appropriate amount of carbon dioxide remains, a mixture of nitrogen and carbon dioxide may be used for the sparging gas.
- Purging and blanketing: The removal of oxygen from the headspace above the wine in a container by flushing with a similar gas mixture to that used for sparging is called purging, and if it is left there it is called blanketing or inerting.

=== Breathing gas mixtures for diving ===
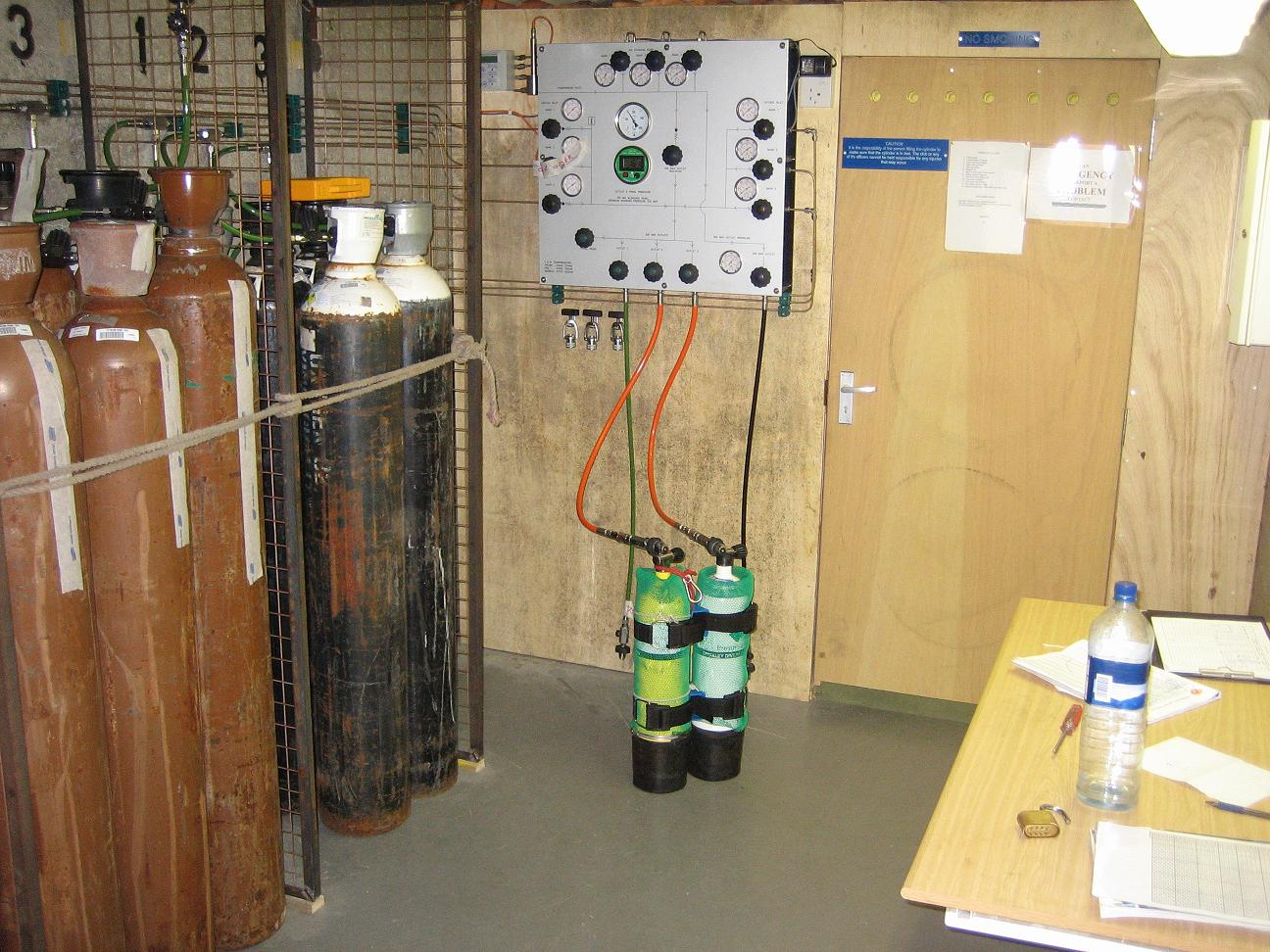
Partial pressure gas blending equipment for scuba diving

A breathing gas is a mixture of gaseous chemical elements and compounds used for respiration. The essential component for any breathing gas is a partial pressure of oxygen of between roughly 0.16 and 1.60 bar at the ambient pressure. The oxygen is usually the only metabolically active component unless the gas is an anaesthetic mixture. Some of the oxygen in the breathing gas is consumed by the metabolic processes, and the inert components are unchanged, and serve mainly to dilute the oxygen to an appropriate concentration, and are therefore also known as diluent gases.

==== Scuba diving ====
Gas blending for scuba diving is the filling of diving cylinders with non-air breathing gases such as nitrox, trimix and heliox. Use of these gases is generally intended to improve overall safety of the planned dive, by reducing the risk of decompression sickness and/or nitrogen narcosis, and may improve ease of breathing.

==== Surface supplied and saturation diving ====
Gas blending for surface supplied and saturation diving may include the filling of bulk storage cylinders and bailout cylinders with breathing gases, but it also involves the mixing of breathing gases at lower pressure which are supplied directly to the diver or to the hyperbaric life-support system. Part of the operation of the life-support system is the replenishment of oxygen used by the occupants, and removal of the carbon dioxide waste product by the gas conditioning unit. This entails monitoring of the composition of the chamber gas and periodic addition of oxygen to the chamber gas at the internal pressure of the chamber.

The gas mixing unit is part of the life support equipment of a saturation system, along with other components which may include bulk gas storage, compressors, helium recovery unit, bell and diver hot water supply, gas conditioning unit and emergency power supply

=== Medical gas mixtures ===
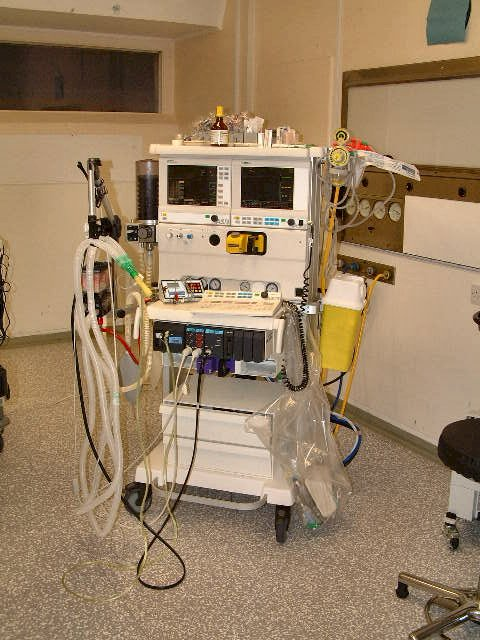
Anesthetic machine

The anesthetic machine is used to blend breathing gas for patients under anesthesia during surgery. The gas mixing and delivery system lets the anesthetist control oxygen fraction, nitrous oxide concentration and the concentration of volatile anesthetic agents. The machine is usually supplied with oxygen (O_{2}) and nitrous oxide (N_{2}O) from low pressure lines and high pressure reserve cylinders, and the metered gas is mixed at ambient pressure, after which additional anesthetic agents may be added by a vaporizer, and the gas may be humidified. Air is used as a diluent to decrease oxygen concentration. In special cases other gases may also be added to the mixture. These may include carbon dioxide (CO_{2}), used to stimulate respiration, and helium (He) to reduce resistance to flow or to enhance heat transfer.

Gas mixing systems may be mechanical, using conventional rotameter banks, or electronic, using proportional solenoids or pulsed injectors, and control may be manual or automatic.

=== Chemical production processes ===
Providing reactive gaseous materials for chemical production processes in the required ratio

=== Controlled atmosphere manufacture and storage ===
Protective gas mixtures may be used to exclude air or other gases from the surface of sensitive materials during processing. Examples include melting of reactive metals such as magnesium, and heat treatment of steels.

=== Customized gas mixtures for analytical applications ===
Calibration gases:

- Span gases are used for testing and calibrating gas detection equipment by exposing the sensor to a known concentration of a contaminant. The gases are used as a reference point to ensure correct readings after calibration and have very accurate composition, with a content of the gas to be detected close to the set value for the detector.
- Zero gas is normally a gas free of the component to be measured, and as similar as practicable to the composition of the gas to be monitored, used to calibrate the zero point of the sensor.

Calibration gas mixtures are generally produced in batches by gravimetric or volumetric methods.

The gravimetric method uses sensitive and accurately calibrated scales to weigh the amounts of gases added into the cylinder. Precise measurement is required as inaccuracy or impurities can result in incorrect calibration. The container for calibration gas must be as close to perfectly clean as practicable. The cylinders may be cleaned by purging with high purity nitrogen, then evacuated. For particularly critical mixtures the cylinder may be heated while being evacuated to facilitate removal of any impurities adhering to the walls.

After filling, the gas mixture must be thoroughly mixed to ensure that all components are evenly distributed throughout the container to prevent possible variations on composition within the container. This is commonly done by rolling the container horizontally for 2 to 4 hours.

== Methods ==
Several methods are available for gas blending. These may be distinguished as batch methods and continuous processes.

=== Batch methods ===
Batch gas blending requires the appropriate amounts of the constituent gases to be measured and mixed together until the mixture is homogeneous. The amounts are based on the mole (or molar) fractions, but measured either by volume or by mass. Volume measurement may be done indirectly by partial pressure, as the gases are often sequentially decanted into the same container for mixing, and therefore occupy the same volume. Weight measurement is generally used as a proxy for mass measurement as acceleration can usually be considered constant.

The mole fraction is also called the amount fraction, and is the number of molecules of a constituent divided by the total number of all molecules in the mixture. For example, a 50% oxygen, 50% helium mixture will contain approximately the same number of molecules of oxygen and helium. As both oxygen and helium approximate ideal gases at pressures below 200 bar, each will occupy the same volume at the same pressure and temperature, so they can be measured by volume at the same pressure, then mixed, or by partial pressure when decanted into the same container.

The mass fraction can be calculated from the molar fraction by multiplying the molar fraction by the molecular mass for each constituent, to find a constituent mass, and comparing it to the summed masses of all the constituents. The actual mass of each constituent needed for a mixture is calculated by multiplying the mass fraction by the desired mass of the mixture.

==== Partial pressure blending ====
Also known as volumetric blending. This must be done at constant temperature for best accuracy, though it is possible to compensate for temperature changes in proportion to the accuracy of the temperature measured before and after each gas is added to the mixture.

Partial pressure blending is commonly used for breathing gases for diving. The accuracy required for this application can be achieved by using a pressure gauge which reads accurately to 0.5 bar, and allowing the temperature to equilibrate after each gas is added.

==== Mass fraction blending ====
Also known as gravimetric blending. This is relatively unaffected by temperature, and accuracy depends on the accuracy of mass measurement of the constituents.

Mass fraction blending is used where great accuracy of the mixture is critical, such as in calibration gases. The method is not suited to moving platforms where the accelerations can cause inaccurate measurement, and therefore is unsuitable for mixing diving gases on vessels.

=== Continuous processes ===
==== Additive ====
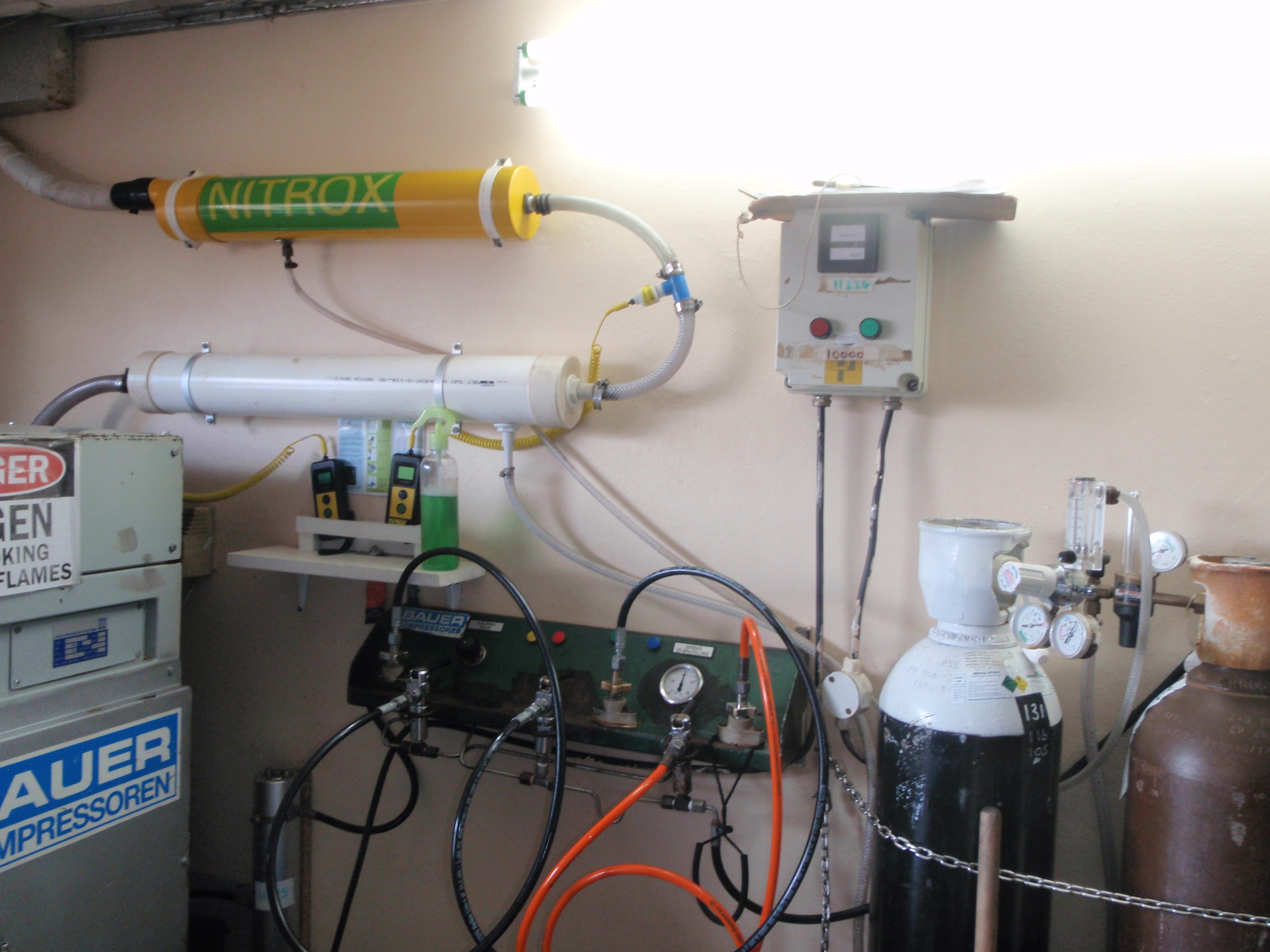
Nitrox blending station using continuous flow blending before compression

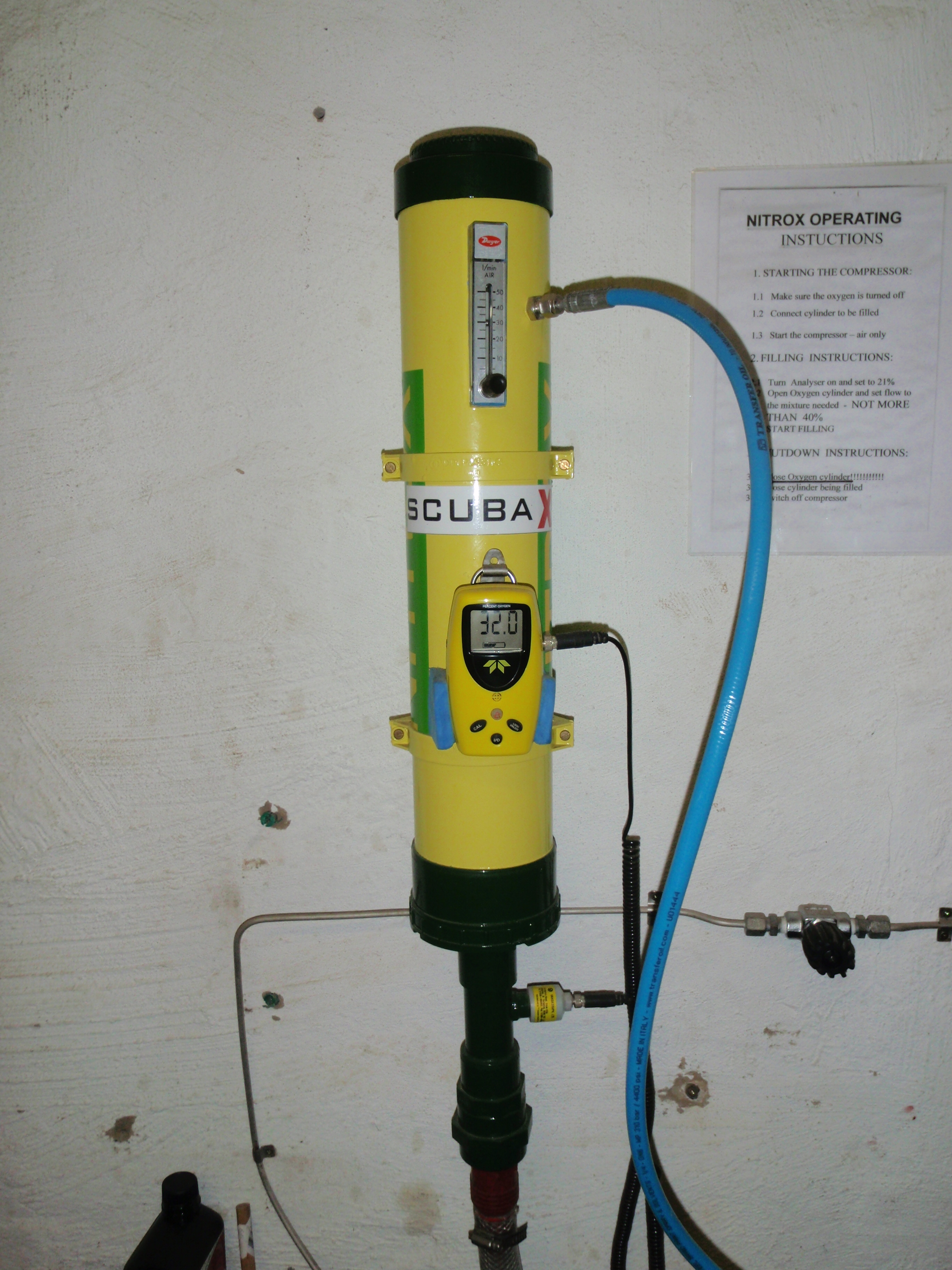
Nitrox blending tube for mixing oxygen into the intake air for a compressor

- Constant flow blending – a controlled flow of the constituent gases is mixed to form the product. Blending may occur at ambient pressure or at a pressure setting above ambient but lower than supply gas pressures.
  - Constant mass flow supply: Precision mass flow controllers are used to control the flow rate of each gas for blending. Mass flow meters may be installed on the outputs of the mass flow controllers to monitor the output. The gases may be passed through a static mixer to ensure homogeneous output. Dynamic standards such as ISO 6145-7 describe preparation of calibration gas mixtures using thermal mass-flow controllers; manufacturer technical data outline typical performance ranges and constraints in industrial service.

Continuous gas blending is used for some surface supplied diving applications, and for many chemical processes using reactive gas mixtures, particularly where there may be a need to alter the mixture during the operation or process.

==== Subtractive ====
These processes start with a mixture of gases, usually air, and reduce the concentration of one or more of the constituents. These processes can be used for the production of Nitrox for scuba diving and deoxygenated air for blanketing purposes.

- Pressure swing adsorption – Selective adsorption of gas on a medium which is reversible and proportional to pressure. Gas is loaded onto the medium during the high pressure phase and is released during the low pressure phase.
- Membrane gas separation – Gas is forced through a semi-permeable membrane by a pressure difference. Some of the constituent gases pass through the membrane more easily than the others, and the output from the low pressure side is enriched with the gases which pass through more easily. Gases which are slower to pass through the membrane accumulate on the high pressure side and are continuously discharged to retain a steady concentration. The process may be repeated in several stages to increase concentrations.

== Gas analysis ==
Gas mixtures are typically analysed either in-process (on-line) or off-line after blending to confirm composition and fitness for use. Objectives include verifying target amount fractions, checking stability/contamination (e.g., moisture or hydrocarbons), and documenting traceability and uncertainty. Certificates for calibration mixtures follow ISO 6141, and comparison/calibration procedures are described in ISO 6143; national metrology programmes (e.g., NIST SRMs/NTRMs and EPA Protocol Gases in the United States) underpin traceability in many industries.

Common analytical principles. Selection depends on target species, range, matrix and required uncertainty:

- Oxygen (O_{2}): paramagnetic analysers (attraction of O_{2} in a magnetic field) for percent-level O_{2}; other options include electrochemical fuel-cell sensors and zirconia at elevated temperature.
- Carbon dioxide (CO_{2}) / carbon monoxide (CO): non-dispersive infrared (NDIR) photometry is widely used and designated a Federal Reference/Equivalent Method in ambient air regulations for CO; extractive NDIR is also used for process streams.
- Total hydrocarbons (THC): flame-ionisation detector (FID) for total gaseous organic concentration; used with heated sampling for condensable streams.
- Oxides of nitrogen (NO_{x}): gas-phase chemiluminescence (reaction of NO with O_{3} to form excited NO_{2}) with converter for NO_{2} → NO; performance and QA/QC are specified in Method 7E.
- Hydrogen, helium and other permanent gases: thermal-conductivity detection (TCD) or gas chromatography (GC-TCD/micro-GC), often in natural-gas and specialty-gas contexts; performance evaluation for online systems is described in ISO 10723.

Moisture (water vapour). Trace moisture strongly affects stability and reactivity; common methods include chilled-mirror hygrometers (primary dew/frost-point measurement used as a reference), electrolytic (P_{2}O_{5}) sensors and capacitive polymer sensors for process indication.

Sampling and conditioning. Good practice minimises adsorption, condensation and fractionation: use inert materials (e.g., 316L stainless steel or appropriately passivated surfaces), short heated lines for wet/condensable matrices, particulate filtration upstream of instruments, and regulators/pressure control sized to avoid Joule–Thomson cooling. For pressurised cylinders, allow thermal equilibrium and homogenise mixtures before analysis (e.g., rolling or inversion for multi-component blends). Applicable regulatory/standard methods include zero/span checks, linearity and drift tests to verify performance before and after runs (e.g., EPA Methods 3A, 7E, 25A for instrument checks in emissions monitoring).

Calibration, verification and uncertainty. Routine calibration uses certified gas mixtures with stated uncertainties and traceability; comparison methods per ISO 6143 are used to determine or check composition and to propagate uncertainty from reference mixtures. Natural-gas-sector online analysers are often evaluated against ISO 10723 protocols. National metrology institute programmes (e.g., NIST SRM/NTRM and EPA Protocol Gas schemes) provide reference materials and frameworks for traceable calibration hierarchies.

== See also ==
- Gas blending for scuba diving
- Modified atmosphere packaging
