= Equivalent narcotic depth =

Method for comparing the narcotic effects of a mixed diving gas with air

Equivalent narcotic depth (END) (historically also equivalent nitrogen depth) is used in technical diving as a way of estimating the narcotic effect of a breathing gas mixture, such as nitrox, heliox or trimix. The method is used, for a given breathing gas mix and dive depth, to calculate the equivalent depth which would produce about the same narcotic effect when breathing air.

The equivalent narcotic depth of a breathing gas mix at a particular depth is calculated by finding the depth at which breathing air would have the same total partial pressure of narcotic components as the breathing gas in question.

Since air is composed of approximately 21% oxygen and 79% nitrogen, it makes a difference whether oxygen is considered narcotic, and how narcotic it is considered relative to nitrogen. If oxygen is considered to be equally narcotic to nitrogen, the narcotic gases make up 100% of the mix, or equivalently the fraction of the total gases which are narcotic is 1.0. Oxygen is assumed equivalent in narcotic effect to nitrogen for this purpose by some authorities and certification agencies. In contrast, other authorities and agencies consider oxygen to be non-narcotic, and group it with helium and other potential non-narcotic components, or less narcotic, and group it with gases like hydrogen, which has a narcotic effect estimated at 55% of nitrogen based on lipid solubility.

Research continues into the nature and mechanism of inert gas narcosis, and for objective methods of measurement for comparison of the severity at different depths and different gas compositions.

== Oxygen narcosis ==
Although oxygen has greater lipid solubility than nitrogen and therefore should be more narcotic according to the Meyer-Overton correlation, it is likely that some of the oxygen is metabolised, thus reducing its effect to a level similar to that of nitrogen or less.

There are also known exceptions to the Meyer-Overton correlation. Some gases that should be very narcotic based on their high solubility in oil, are much less narcotic than predicted. Anesthetic research has shown that for a gas to be narcotic, its molecule must bind to receptors on the neurons, and some molecules have a shape that is not conducive to such binding. It is unknown if and how oxygen binds to neuronal receptors, so the measurable fact that oxygen is more oil-soluble than nitrogen, does not necessarily mean it is more narcotic than nitrogen.

Since there is some evidence that oxygen plays a part in the narcotic effects of a gas mixture, some organisations prefer assuming that it is narcotic to the previous method of considering only the nitrogen component as narcotic, since this assumption is more conservative, and the NOAA diving manual recommends treating oxygen and nitrogen as equally narcotic as a way to simplify calculations, given that no measured value is available.

The situation is further complicated by the effects of inert gas narcosis being significantly variable between divers using the same gas mixture, and between occasions for the same diver on the same gas and dive profile.

Objective testing has failed to demonstrate oxygen narcosis, and research continues. There has been difficulty in identifying a reliable method of objectively measuring gas narcosis, but quantitative electroencephalography (EEG) has produced interesting results. Quantification of the more subtle effects of inert gas narcosis is difficult. Psychometric tests can be variable and affected by learning effects, and participant motivation. In principle, objective neurophysiological measurements like quantitative electroencephalogram (qEEG) analysis and the critical flicker fusion frequency (CFFF) could be used to get objective measurements.

Some studies have shown a decrease in CFFF during air-breathing dives at 4 bar (30 msw), but have not detected a change with partial pressure of pure oxygen within the breathable range. The results with CFFF for nitrogen do not scale well with partial pressure at greater depths.

Hyperbaric inert gas narcosis is associated with depressed brain activity when measured with an EEG. A functional connectivity metric based on the so-called mutual information analysis has been developed, and summarized using the global efficiency network measure. This method has successfully differentiated between breathing air at the surface and air at 50 m, and even showed an effect at 18 m on air, but did not show a difference associated with pressure for heliox exposures. The lack of change with heliox suggests that the effect of hyperbaric nitrogen is measured, and not a direct pressure effect.

The EEG functional connectivity metric did not change while breathing hyperbaric oxygen within the safe range for testing, which indicates that oxygen does not produce the same changes in brain electrical activity associated with high partial pressures of nitrogen, which suggests that oxygen is not narcotic in the same way as nitrogen.

== Carbon dioxide narcosis ==
Although carbon dioxide (CO_{2}) is known to be more narcotic than nitrogen – a rise in end-tidal alveolar partial pressure of CO_{2} of 10 millimetres of mercury (13 mbar) caused an impairment of both mental and psychomotor functions of approximately 10% – the effects of carbon dioxide retention are not considered in these calculations, as the concentration of CO_{2} in the supplied breathing gas is normally low, and the alveolar concentration is mostly affected by diver exertion and ventilation issues, and indirectly by work of breathing due to equipment and gas density effects.

The driving mechanism of CO_{2} narcosis in divers is acute hypercapnia. The potential causes can be split into four groups: insufficient ventilation, excessive dead space, increased metabolic carbon dioxide production, and high carbon dioxide content of the breathing gas, usually only a problem with rebreathers. Insufficient ventilation can be a consequence of high work of breathing.

== Other components of the breathing gas mixture ==
It is generally accepted as of 2023, that helium has no known narcotic effect at any depth at which gas can be breathed, and can be disregarded as a contributor to inert gas narcosis. Other gases which may be considered include hydrogen and neon.

== Standards ==
The standards recommended by the recreational certification agencies are basically arbitrary, as the actual effects of breathing gas narcosis are poorly understood, and the effects quite variable between individual divers. Some standards are more conservative than others, and in almost all cases it is the responsibility of the individual diver to make the choice and accept the consequence of his decision, except during training programs where standards can be enforced if the agency chooses to do so. One agency, GUE, prescribes the gas mixtures their members are allowed to use, but even that requirement and membership of the organisation is ultimately the choice of the diver. Professional divers may be legally obliged to comply with the codes of practice under which they work, and contractually obliged to follow the requirements of the operations manual of their employer, in terms of occupational health and safety legislation.

Some training agencies, such as CMAS, GUE, and PADI and include oxygen as equivalent to nitrogen in their equivalent narcotic depth (END) calculations. PSAI considers oxygen narcotic but less so than nitrogen. Others like BSAC, IANTD, NAUI and TDI do not consider oxygen narcotic.

== Calculations ==
In diving calculations it is assumed unless otherwise stipulated that the atmospheric pressure is 1 bar or 1 atm. and that the diving medium is water. The ambient pressure at depth is the sum of the hydrostatic pressure due to depth and the atmospheric pressure on the surface. Some early (1978) experimental results suggest that, at raised partial pressures, nitrogen, oxygen and carcon dioxide have narcotic properties, and that the mechanism of CO_{2} narcosis differs fundamentally from that of N_{2} and O_{2} narcosis, and more recent work suggests a significant difference between N_{2} an O_{2} mechanisms. Other components of breathing gases for diving may include hydrogen, neon, and argon, all of which are known or thought to be narcotic to some extent. The formula can be extended to include these gases if desired. The argon normally found in air at about 1% by volume is assumed to be present in the nitrogen component in the same ratio to nitrogen as in air, which simplifies calculation.

Since in the absence of conclusive evidence, oxygen may or may not be considered narcotic, there are two ways to calculate END depending on which opinion is followed.

=== Oxygen considered narcotic ===
Since for these calculations oxygen is usually assumed to be equally narcotic to nitrogen, the ratio considered is of the sum of nitrogen and oxygen in the breathing gas and in air, where air is approximated as entirely consisting of narcotic gas. In this system all nitrox mixtures are assumed to be narcotically indistinguishable from air. The other common calculation assumes that oxygen is not narcotic and is multiplied by a relative narcotic value of 0 on both sides of the equation.

==== Metres ====
The partial pressure in bar, of a component gas in a mixture at a particular depth in metres is given by:

fraction of gas × (depth/10 + 1)

So the equivalent narcotic depth can be calculated as follows:

partial pressure of narcotic gases in air at END = partial pressure of narcotic gases in trimix at a given depth.

or

(fraction of O_{2} x (relative narcotic strength) + fraction of N_{2} x 1) in air × (END/10 + 1) = (fraction of O_{2} x (relative narcotic strength) + fraction of N_{2} x 1) in trimix × (depth/10 +1)

which gives for oxygen deemed equal in narcotic strength to nitrogen:

1.0 × (END/10 + 1) = (fraction of O_{2} + fraction of N_{2}) in trimix × (depth/10 +1)

resulting in:

END = (depth + 10) × (fraction of O_{2} + fraction of N_{2}) in trimix − 10

Since (fraction of O_{2} + fraction of N_{2}) in a trimix = (1 − fraction of helium), the following formula is equivalent:

END = (depth + 10) × (1 − fraction of helium) − 10

Working the earlier example, for a gas mix containing 40% helium being used at 60 metres, the END is:

END = (60 + 10) × (1 − 0.4) − 10
END = 70 × 0.6 − 10
END = 42 − 10
END = 32 metres

So at 60 metres on this mix, the diver would feel approximately the same narcotic effect as a dive on air to 32 metres.

==== Feet ====
The partial pressure of a gas in a mixture at a particular depth in feet is given by:

fraction of gas × (depth/33 + 1)

So the equivalent narcotic depth can be calculated as follows:

partial pressure of narcotic gases in air at END = partial pressure of narcotic gases in trimix at a given depth.

or

(fraction of O_{2} + fraction of N_{2}) in air × (END/33 + 1) = (fraction of O_{2} + fraction of N_{2}) in trimix × (depth/33 +1)

which gives:

1.0 × (END/33 + 1) = (fraction of O_{2} + fraction of N_{2}) in trimix × (depth/33 +1)

resulting in:

END = (depth + 33) × (fraction of O_{2} + fraction of N_{2}) in trimix − 33

Since (fraction of O_{2} + fraction of N_{2}) in a trimix = (1 − fraction of helium), the following formula is equivalent:

END = (depth + 33) × (1 − fraction of helium) − 33

As an example, for a gas mix containing 40% helium being used at 200 feet, the END is:

END = (200 + 33) × (1 − 0.4) − 33
END = 233 × 0.6 − 33
END = 140 − 33
END = 107 feet

So at 200 feet on this mix, the diver would feel the same narcotic effect as a dive on air to 107 feet.

=== Oxygen not considered equally narcotic to nitrogen ===
The ratio of nitrogen between the gas mixture and air is considered. Oxygen may be factored in at a narcotic ratio chosen by the user, or assumed to be negligible. In this system nitrox mixtures are not considered equivalent to air.
