= Maximum operating depth =

Safety concept in underwater diving

In underwater diving activities such as saturation diving, technical diving and nitrox diving, the maximum operating depth (MOD) of a breathing gas is the depth below which the partial pressure of oxygen (pO_{2}) of the gas mix exceeds an acceptable limit. This limit is based on risk of central nervous system oxygen toxicity, and is somewhat arbitrary, and varies depending on the diver training agency or Code of Practice, the level of underwater exertion expected and the planned duration of the dive, but is normally in the range of 1.2 to 1.6 bar.

The MOD is significant when planning dives using gases such as heliox, nitrox and trimix because the proportion of oxygen in the mix determines a maximum depth for breathing that gas at an acceptable risk. There is a risk of acute oxygen toxicity if the MOD is exceeded. The tables below show MODs for a selection of oxygen mixes. Atmospheric air contains approximately 21% oxygen, and has an MOD calculated by the same method.

== Safe limit of partial pressure of oxygen ==
Acute, or central nervous system oxygen toxicity is a time variable response to the partial pressure exposure history of the diver and is both complex and not fully understood.

Central nervous system oxygen toxicity manifests as symptoms such as visual changes (especially tunnel vision), ringing in the ears (tinnitus), nausea, twitching (especially of the face), behavioural changes (irritability, anxiety, confusion), and dizziness. This may be followed by a tonic–clonic seizure consisting of two phases: intense muscle contraction occurs for several seconds (tonic phase); followed by rapid spasms of alternate muscle relaxation and contraction producing convulsive jerking (clonic phase). The seizure ends with a period of unconsciousness (the postictal state). The onset of seizure depends upon the partial pressure of oxygen in the breathing gas and exposure duration. However, exposure time before onset is unpredictable, as tests have shown a wide variation, both amongst individuals, and in the same individual from day to day. In addition, many external factors, such as underwater immersion, exposure to cold, and exercise will decrease the time to onset of central nervous system symptoms. Decrease of tolerance is closely linked to retention of carbon dioxide. Other factors, such as darkness and caffeine, increase tolerance in test animals, but these effects have not been proven in humans.

The maximum single exposure limits recommended in the NOAA Diving Manual are 45 minutes at 1.6 bar, 120 minutes at 1.5 bar, 150 minutes at 1.4 bar, 180 minutes at 1.3 bar and 210 minutes at 1.2 bar.

== Formula ==
The formula simply divides the absolute partial pressure of oxygen which can be tolerated (expressed in atm or bar) by the fraction of oxygen in the breathing gas, to calculate the absolute pressure at which the mix can be breathed. (for example, 50% nitrox can be breathed at twice the pressure of 100% oxygen, so divide by 0.5, etc.). Of this total pressure which can be tolerated by the diver, 1 atmosphere is due to surface pressure of the Earth's air, and the rest is due to the depth in water. So the 1 atmosphere or bar contributed by the air is subtracted to give the pressure due to the depth of water. The pressure produced by depth in water, is converted to pressure in feet sea water (fsw) or metres sea water (msw) by multiplying with the appropriate conversion factor, 33 fsw per atm, or 10 msw per bar.

In feet

$MOD (fsw) = 33\mathrm{~fsw/atm} \times \left [\left ({pO_2\mathrm{~ata}\over FO_2} \right ) - 1\right ]$

In which pO_{2} is the chosen maximum partial pressure of oxygen in atmospheres absolute and the FO_{2} is the fraction of oxygen in the mixture. For example, if a gas contains 36% oxygen (FO_{2} = 0.36) and the limiting maximum pO_{2} is chosen at 1.4 atmospheres absolute, the MOD in feet of seawater (fsw) (Note: Feet sea water (fsw) is a unit of pressure. One fsw is equal to the hydrostatic pressure exerted by a standard sea water column of 1 foot height at normal Earth gravity. 33 fsw is approximately equal to one standard atmosphere (atm). A pressure indicated in fsw is gauge pressure (relative to surface pressure) unless specified.) is 33 fsw/atm x [(1.4 ata / 0.36) − 1] = 95.3 fsw.

In metres

$MOD (msw) =10\mathrm{~ msw/bar} \times \left [\left ({pO_2\mathrm{~ bar}\over FO_2} \right ) - 1\right ]$

In which pO_{2} is the chosen maximum partial pressure in oxygen in bar and the FO_{2} is the fraction of oxygen in the mixture. For example, if a gas contains 36% oxygen and the maximum pO_{2} is 1.4 bar, the MOD (msw) is 10 msw/bar x [(1.4 bar / 0.36) − 1] = 28.9 msw.

== Tables ==
Maximum Operating Depth (MOD) in feet sea water (fsw) for pO_{2} 1.2 to 1.6
MOD (fsw)		% oxygen																
MOD (fsw)		4	8	12	16	20	21	24	28	32	36	40	50	60	70	80	90	100
Maximum pO2 (bar)	1.6	1287	627	407	297	231	218	187	156	132	114	99	73	55	42	33	26	20
Maximum pO2 (bar)	1.5	1205	586	380	276	215	203	173	144	122	105	91	66	50	38	29	22	17
Maximum pO2 (bar)	1.4	1122	545	352	256	198	187	160	132	111	95	83	59	44	33	25	18	13
Maximum pO2 (bar)	1.3	1040	503	325	235	182	171	146	120	101	86	74	53	39	28	21	15	10
Maximum pO2 (bar)	1.2	957	462	297	215	165	156	132	108	91	77	66	46	33	24	17	11	7

These depths are rounded to the nearest foot.

Maximum Operating Depth (MOD) in metres sea water (msw) for pO_{2} 1.2 to 1.6
MOD (msw)		% oxygen																
MOD (msw)		4	8	12	16	20	21	24	28	32	36	40	50	60	70	80	90	100
Maximum pO2 (bar)	1.6	390	190	123	90	70	66	57	47	40	34	30	22	17	13	10	8	6
Maximum pO2 (bar)	1.5	365	178	115	84	65	61	53	44	37	32	28	20	15	11	9	7	5
Maximum pO2 (bar)	1.4	340	165	107	78	60	57	48	40	34	29	25	18	13	10	8	6	4
Maximum pO2 (bar)	1.3	315	153	98	71	55	52	44	36	31	26	23	16	12	9	6	4	3
Maximum pO2 (bar)	1.2	290	140	90	65	50	47	40	33	28	23	20	14	10	7	5	3	2

These depths are rounded to the nearest metre.

== See also ==
- Oxygen toxicity – Toxic effects of breathing oxygen at high partial pressures
- Minimum operating depth – Depth above which the oxygen concentration is too low to breathe safely

== Sources ==
- Clark, James M; Thom, Stephen R (2003). "Oxygen under pressure". In Brubakk, Alf O; Neuman, Tom S (eds.). Bennett and Elliott's physiology and medicine of diving (5th ed.). United States: Saunders. pp. 358–418. ISBN 978-0-7020-2571-6. OCLC 51607923.
- Donald, Kenneth W (1947). "Oxygen Poisoning in Man: Part I". British Medical Journal. 1 (4506): 667–672. doi:10.1136/bmj.1.4506.667. PMC 2053251. PMID 20248086.
- Lang, Michael A, ed. (2001). DAN nitrox workshop proceedings. Durham, NC: Divers Alert Network, 197 pages. Archived from the original on October 24, 2008.
- U.S. Navy Supervisor of Diving (2011). U.S. Navy Diving Manual (PDF). SS521-AG-PRO-010 0910-LP-106-0957, revision 6 with Change A entered. U.S. Naval Sea Systems Command. Archived from the original (PDF) on 2014-12-10.
