= Trimix (breathing gas) =

Breathing gas consisting of oxygen, helium and nitrogen

Trimix scuba cylinder label

IMCA Trimix cylinder shoulder colour code

Alternative IMCA Trimix cylinder shoulder colour code

Trimix is a breathing gas consisting of oxygen, helium, and nitrogen. It is used in deep commercial diving, during the deep phase of dives carried out using technical diving techniques, and in advanced recreational diving.

The helium is included as a substitute for some of the nitrogen, to reduce the narcotic effect of the breathing gas at depth and to reduce the work of breathing. With a mixture of three gases it is possible to create mixes suitable for different depths or purposes by adjusting the proportions of each gas. Oxygen content can be optimised for the depth to limit the risk of toxicity, and the inert component balanced between nitrogen (which is cheap but narcotic) and helium (which is not narcotic and reduces work of breathing, but is more expensive and can increase heat loss).

The mixture of helium and oxygen with a 0% nitrogen content is generally known as heliox. This is frequently used as a breathing gas in deep commercial diving operations, where it is often recycled to save the expensive helium component. Analysis of two-component gases is much simpler than three-component gases.

== Applications ==
Trimix is used as an ambient pressure breathing gas for underwater diving. It has been used in both scuba and surface-supplied applications, for professional and recreational diving, and for surface oriented and saturation diving. The most common use is in recreational technical diving.

In open-circuit scuba, two classes of trimix are commonly used: normoxic trimix—with a minimum PO_{2} at the surface of 0.18 and hypoxic trimix—with a PO_{2} less than 0.18 at the surface. A normoxic mix such as "19/30" is used in the 30 to 60 m (100 to 200 ft) depth range; a hypoxic mix such as "10/50" is used for deeper diving, as a bottom gas only, and cannot safely be breathed at shallow depths where the PO_{2} is less than 0.18 bar.

In fully closed-circuit rebreathers that use trimix diluents, the mix in the breathing loop can be hyperoxic (meaning more oxygen than in air, as in enriched air nitrox) in shallow water, because the rebreather automatically adds oxygen to maintain a specific partial pressure of oxygen. Hyperoxic trimix is also sometimes used on open circuit scuba, to reduce decompression obligations.

== Function of the helium ==
The main reason for adding helium to the breathing mix is to reduce the proportions of nitrogen and oxygen below those of air, to allow the gas mix to be breathed safely on deep dives. A lower proportion of nitrogen is required to reduce nitrogen narcosis and other physiological effects of the gas at depth. Helium has very little narcotic effect. A lower proportion of oxygen reduces the risk of oxygen toxicity on deep dives.

The lower density of helium reduces breathing resistance at depth. Work of breathing can limit the use of breathing gas mixtures in underwater breathing apparatus, as with increasing depth a point may be reached where work of breathing exceeds the available effort from the diver. Beyond this point accumulation of carbon dioxide will eventually result in severe and debilitating hypercapnia, which, if not corrected quickly, will cause the diver to attempt to breathe faster, exacerbating the work of breathing, which will lead to loss of consciousness and a high risk of drowning.

Because of its low molecular weight, helium enters and leaves tissues by diffusion more rapidly than nitrogen as the pressure is increased or reduced (this is called on-gassing and off-gassing). Because of its lower solubility, helium does not load tissues as heavily as nitrogen, but at the same time the tissues can not support as high an amount of helium when super-saturated. In effect, helium is a faster gas to saturate and desaturate, which is a distinct advantage in saturation diving, but less so in bounce diving, where the increased rate of off-gassing is largely counterbalanced by the equivalently increased rate of on-gassing.

Some divers suffer from compression arthralgia during deep descent, and trimix has been shown to help avoid or delay the symptoms of compression arthralgia.

== Disadvantages of the helium ==
Helium conducts heat six times faster than air, so helium-breathing divers often carry a separate supply of a different gas to inflate drysuits. This is to avoid the risk of hypothermia caused by using helium as inflator gas. Argon, carried in a small, separate tank connected only to the inflator of the drysuit, is preferred to air, since air conducts heat 50% faster than argon. Dry suits (if used together with a buoyancy compensator) still require a minimum of inflation to avoid "suit squeeze", i.e. injury to skin caused by pinching by tight dry suit folds.

Helium diffuses into tissues (called ingassing) more rapidly than nitrogen as the ambient pressure is increased. A consequence of the higher loading in some tissues is that some decompression algorithms require deeper decompression stops than a similar pressure exposure dive using air, and helium is more likely to come out of solution and cause decompression sickness following a fast ascent.

In addition to physiological disadvantages, the use of trimix also has economic and logistic disadvantages. The price of helium increased by over 51% between the years 2000 and 2011. This price increase affects open-circuit divers more than closed-circuit divers due to the larger volume of helium consumed on a typical trimix dive. Additionally, as trimix fills require more expensive helium analysis equipment than air and nitrox fills, there are fewer trimix filling stations. The relative scarcity of trimix filling stations may necessitate going far out of one's way in order to procure the necessary mix for a deep dive that requires the gas.

== Advantages of controlling the oxygen fraction ==
Lowering the oxygen content of a breathing gas mixture increases the maximum operating depth and duration of the dive before which oxygen toxicity becomes a limiting factor. Most trimix divers limit their working oxygen partial pressure [PO_{2}] to 1.4 bar and may reduce the P_{O_{2}} further to 1.3 bar or 1.2 bar depending on the depth, the duration and the kind of breathing system used. A maximum oxygen partial pressure of 1.4 bar for the active sectors of the dive, and 1.6 bar for decompression stops is recommended by several recreational and technical diving certification agencies for open circuit, and 1.2 bar or 1.3 bar as maximum for the active sectors of a dive on closed-circuit rebreather. Increasing the oxygen fraction in a trimix to be used as a decompression gas can accelerate decompression with a lowered risk of isobaric counter diffusion complications.

== Advantages of keeping some nitrogen in the mix ==
Retaining nitrogen in trimix can contribute to the prevention of high-pressure nervous syndrome, a problem that can occur when breathing heliox at depths beyond about 130 metres (430 ft). Nitrogen is also much less expensive than helium.

== Naming conventions ==
The term trimix implies that the gas has three functional components, which are helium, nitrogen and oxygen. Since the nitrogen and all or part of the oxygen is usually provided from air, the other components of ordinary atmospheric air are generally ignored. Conventionally, the composition of a mix is specified by its oxygen percentage, helium percentage and optionally the balance percentage, nitrogen, in that order. For example, a mix named "trimix 10/70" or trimix 10/70/20, consisting of 10% oxygen, 70% helium, 20% nitrogen is suitable for a 100-metre (330 ft) dive. Hyperoxic trimix is sometimes referred to as Helitrox, TriOx, or HOTx (High Oxygen Trimix) with the "x" in HOTx representing the mixture's fraction of helium as a percentage.

The basic term Trimix is sufficient, modified as appropriate with the terms hypoxic, normoxic and hyperoxic, and the usual forms for indicating constituent gas fraction, to describe any possible ratio of gases, but the National Association of Underwater Instructors (NAUI) uses the term "helitrox" for hyperoxic 26/17 Trimix, i.e. 26% oxygen, 17% helium, 57% nitrogen. Helitrox requires decompression stops similar to Nitrox-I (EAN32) and has a maximum operating depth of 44 metres (144 ft), where it has an equivalent narcotic depth of 35 metres (115 ft). This allows diving throughout the usual recreational range, while decreasing decompression obligation and narcotic effects compared to air. GUE and UTD also promote hyperoxic trimix for this depth range, but prefer the term "TriOx".

The use of trimix as a breathing gas while diving is called trimix diving, and is a sub-category of mixed gas diving, also sometimes referred to simply as gas diving.

== Blending ==
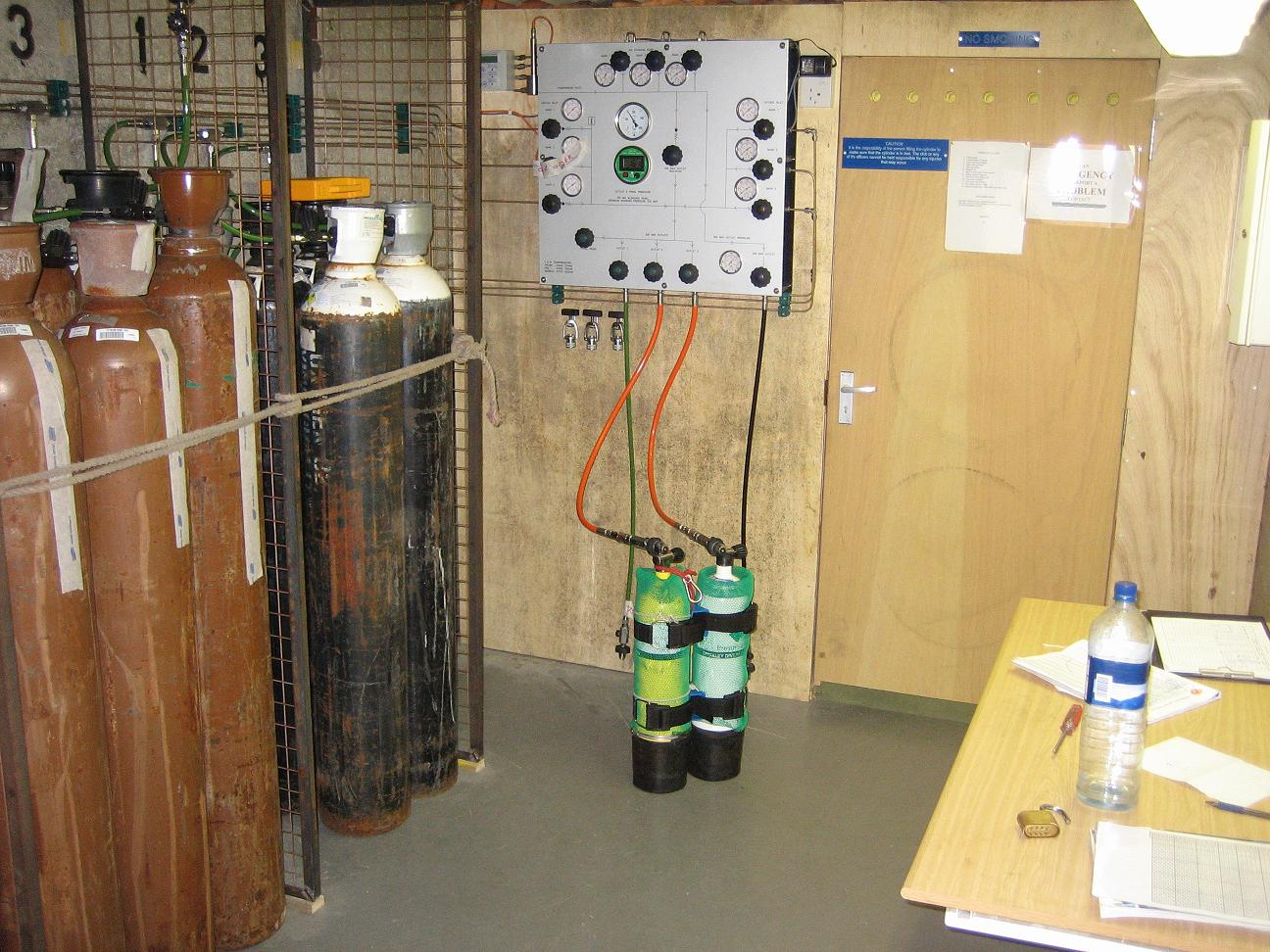
Partial pressure gas blending equipment for scuba diving

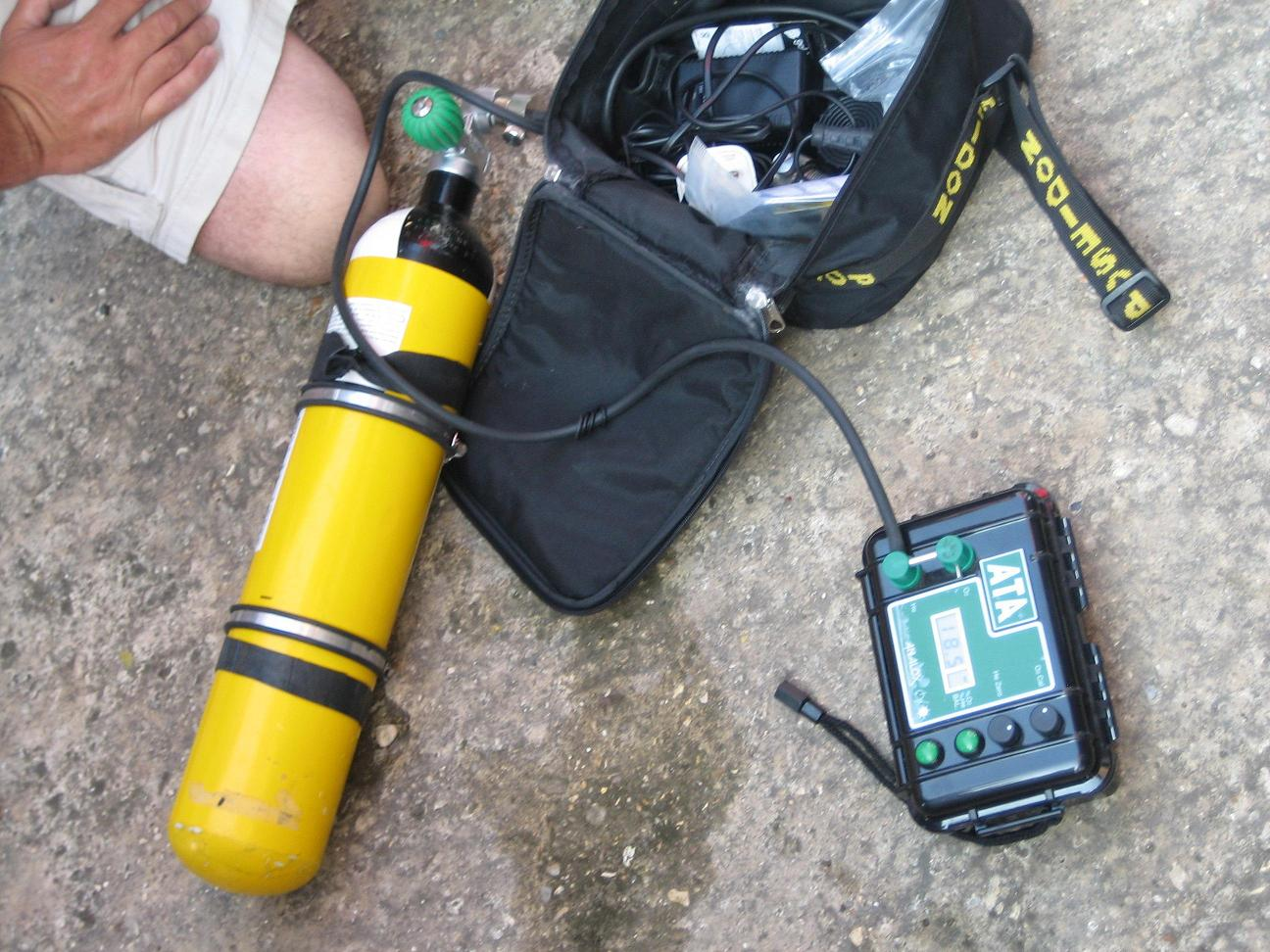
Gas blending oxygen and helium analyser

Gas blending of trimix generally involves mixing helium and oxygen with air to the desired proportions and pressure. Two methods are in common use:

Partial pressure blending is done by decanting oxygen and helium into the diving cylinder and then topping up the mix with air from a diving air compressor. To ensure an accurate mix, after each helium and oxygen transfer, the mix is allowed to cool, its pressure is measured and further gas is decanted until the correct pressure is achieved. This process often takes hours and is sometimes spread over days at busy blending stations. Corrections can be made for temperature effect, but this requires accurate monitoring of the temperature of the mixture inside the cylinder, which is generally not available.

A second method called 'continuous blending' is done by mixing oxygen and helium into the intake air of a compressor. The oxygen and helium are fed into mixing tubes in the intake air stream using flow meters or analysis of the oxygen content after oxygen addition and before and after the helium addition, and the oxygen and helium flows adjusted accordingly. On the high pressure side of the compressor a regulator or bleed orifice is used to reduce pressure of a sample flow and the trimix is analyzed (preferably for both helium and oxygen) so that the fine adjustment to the intake gas flows can be made. The benefit of such a system is that the helium delivery tank pressure need not be as high as that used in the partial pressure method of blending and residual gas can be 'topped up' to best mix after the dive. This is important mainly because of the high cost of helium. Drawbacks may be that the high heat of compression of helium results in the compressor overheating, especially in hot weather. Temperature of the trimix entering the analyser should be kept constant for best reliability of the analysis, and the analyser should be calibrated at ambient temperature before use. The mixing tube is a very simple device, and DIY versions of the continuous blend units can be made for a relatively low cost compared to the cost of analysers and compressor.

=== Choice of mixture composition ===
The ratio of gases in a particular mix is chosen to give a safe maximum operating depth and comfortable equivalent narcotic depth for the planned dive. Safe limits for mix of gases in trimix are generally accepted to be a maximum partial pressure of oxygen (PO_{2}—see Dalton's law) of 1.0 to 1.6 bar and maximum equivalent narcotic depth of 30 to 50 m (100 to 160 ft). At 100 m (330 ft), "12/52" has a PO_{2} of 1.3 bar and an equivalent narcotic depth of 43 m (141 ft).

Mix composition choice is also affected by limitations on breathing gas density to prevent excessive work of breathing.

=== "Standard" mixes ===
Although theoretically trimix can be blended with almost any combination of helium and oxygen, a number of "standard" mixes have evolved (such as 21/35, 18/45 and 15/55—see Naming conventions). Most of these mixes originated from starting by decanting a given pressure of helium into an empty cylinder, and then topping up the mix with 32% nitrox. The "standard" mixes evolved because of three coinciding factors — the desire to keep the equivalent narcotic depth (END) of the mix at approximately 34 metres (112 ft), the requirement to keep the partial pressure of oxygen at 1.4 ATA or below at the deepest point of the dive, and the fact that many dive shops stored standard 32% nitrox in banks, which simplifies mixing. The use of standard mixes makes it relatively easy to top up diving cylinders after a dive using residual mix — only helium and banked nitrox are needed to top up the residual gas from the last fill. This can be also be applied by using a compressor with a membrane separation system or continuous blending set for a Nitrox32 output.

The method of mixing a known nitrox mix with helium allows analysis of the fractions of each gas using only an oxygen analyser, since the ratio of the oxygen fraction in the final mix to the oxygen fraction in the initial nitrox gives the fraction of nitrox in the final mix, hence the fractions of the three components are easily calculated. It is demonstrably true that the END of a nitrox-helium mixture at its maximum operating depth (MOD) is equal to the MOD of the nitrox alone.

==== Heliair ====
Heliair is a breathing gas consisting of mixture of oxygen, nitrogen and helium and is often used during the deep phase of dives carried out using technical diving techniques. This term, first used by Sheck Exley, is mostly used by Technical Diving International (TDI).

It is easily blended from helium and air and so has a fixed 21:79 ratio of oxygen to nitrogen with the balance consisting of a variable amount of helium. It is sometimes referred to as "poor man's trimix", because it is much easier to blend than trimix blends with variable oxygen content, since all that is required is to insert the requisite partial pressure of helium, and then top up with air from a conventional compressor. The more complicated (and dangerous) step of adding pure oxygen at pressure required to blend trimix is absent when blending heliair.

Heliair blends are similar to the standard Trimix blends made with helium and Nitrox 32, but with a deeper END at MOD. Heliair will always have less than 21% oxygen, and will be hypoxic (less than 17% oxygen) for mixes with more than 20% helium.

== History as a diving gas ==
- 1919: Professor Elihu Thomson speculates that helium could be used instead of nitrogen to reduce the breathing resistance at great depth. Heliox was used with air tables resulting in a high incidence of decompression sickness, so the use of helium was discontinued.
- 1924: The US Navy begins examining helium's potential usage and by the mid-1920s lab animals were exposed to experimental chamber dives using heliox. Soon, human subjects breathing heliox 20/80 (20% oxygen, 80% helium) had been successfully decompressed from deep dives.
- 1937: Several test dives are conducted with helium mixtures, including salvage diver Max "Gene" Nohl's dive to 127 meters.
- 1939: US Navy uses heliox in USS Squalus salvage operation. Heliox usage, coupled with the absence of decrement in co-ordination and cognitive function in the salvage divers, confirms Behnke's theory of nitrogen narcosis.
- 1963: First saturation dives using trimix as part of Project Genesis.
- 1965: Nic Flemming's work to study sand ribbons in the English Channel becomes the first to compare diver performance while breathing air and heliox in the open water.
- 1970: Hal Watts recovers two bodies at Mystery Sink (126 m).
- 1979: A research team headed by Peter B. Bennett at the Duke University Medical Center Hyperbaric Laboratory begins the "Atlantis Dive Series" which proves the mechanisms behind the use of trimix to prevent High Pressure Nervous Syndrome symptoms.
- 1983: Cave diver Jochen Hasenmayer uses heliox to a depth of 212 meters. Depth is later repeated by Sheck Exley in 1987.
- 1987: First mass use of trimix and heliox: Wakulla Springs Project. Exley teaches non-commercial divers in relation to trimix usage in cave diving.
- 1991: Billy Deans commences teaching of trimix diving for recreational diving. Tom Mount develops first trimix training standards (IANTD). Use of trimix spreads rapidly to North East American wreck diving community.
- 1992: The National Oceanographic and Atmospheric Administration (NOAA) develops "Monitor Mix" for dives to the USS Monitor. This mix became NOAA Trimix I, with decompression tables designed by Bill Hamilton published in the NOAA Diving Manual.
- 1992: NOAA obtains training from Key West Divers to conduct the first NOAA-sponsored trimix dives on the wreck of the USS Monitor off Cape Hatteras, NC.
- 1994: Combined UK/USA team, including wreck divers John Chatterton and Gary Gentile, successfully completes a series of wreck dives on the RMS Lusitania expedition to a depth of 100 meters using trimix.
- 1994: Sheck Exley and Jim Bowden use "heliair" at Zacaton in the first attempt to make an open circuit scuba dive to 1000 ft. Exley, at the time holding the world record for an 881-foot dive, passes out and dies around 900 feet; Bowden aborts at 925 feet and survives despite several life-threatening obstacles.
- 2001: John Bennett becomes the first scuba diver to dive to 300 metres (1,000 ft), using trimix.
- 2005: David Shaw sets depth record for using a trimix rebreather, and dies while repeating the dive to attempt to recover the body of another diver.
- 2015: The United States Navy Experimental Diving Unit shows that bounce dives using trimix are not more decompression efficient than dives on heliox.

== Training and certification ==
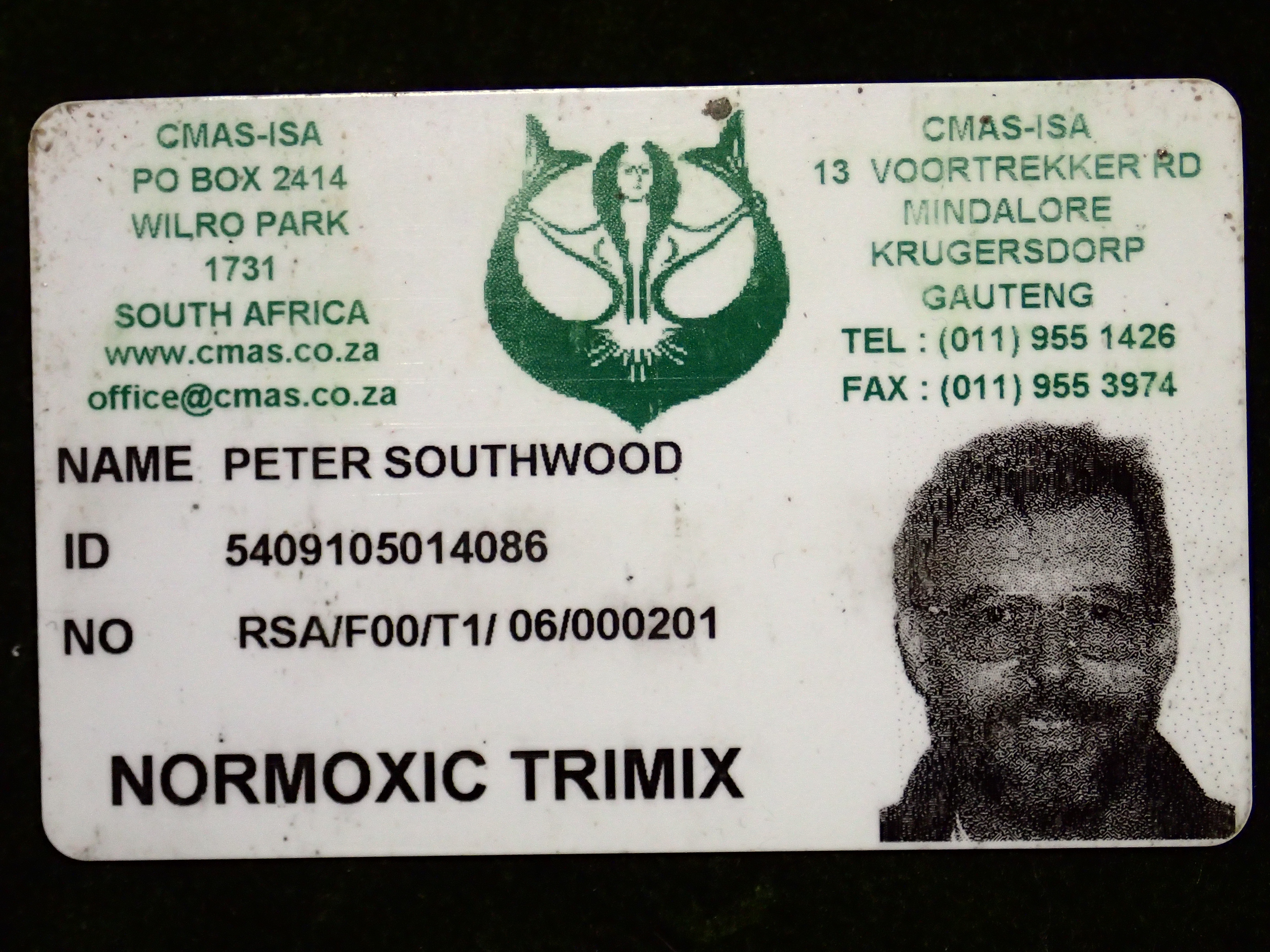
CMAS-ISA Normoxic Trimix diver certification card

Technical diver training and certification agencies may differentiate between levels of trimix diving qualifications, The usual distinction is between normoxic trimix and hypoxic trimix, sometimes also called full trimix. The basic distinction is that for hypoxic trimix diving the dive cannot be started on the bottom mix, and procedures for use of a travel mix for the first part of the descent, and gas switching during the descent to avoid oxygen toxicity are added to the required skills. Longer decompression using a larger variety of mixtures may also complicate procedures. In closed circuit rebreather diving, use of a hypoxic diluent prevents the diver from conducting a diluent flush at shallow depths while breathing from the loop, so that it remains possible at the maximum depth of the dive, where it may be more critical.

== See also ==
- Argox – Gas mixture occasionally used by scuba divers for dry-suit inflation
- Heliox – Breathing gas mixed from helium and oxygen
- Hydreliox – Breathing gas mixture of hydrogen, helium, and oxygen
- Hydrox – Breathing gas mixture experimentally used for very deep diving
- Nitrox – Breathing gas, mixture of nitrogen and oxygen
