= Police diving =

Branch of professional diving carried out by police services

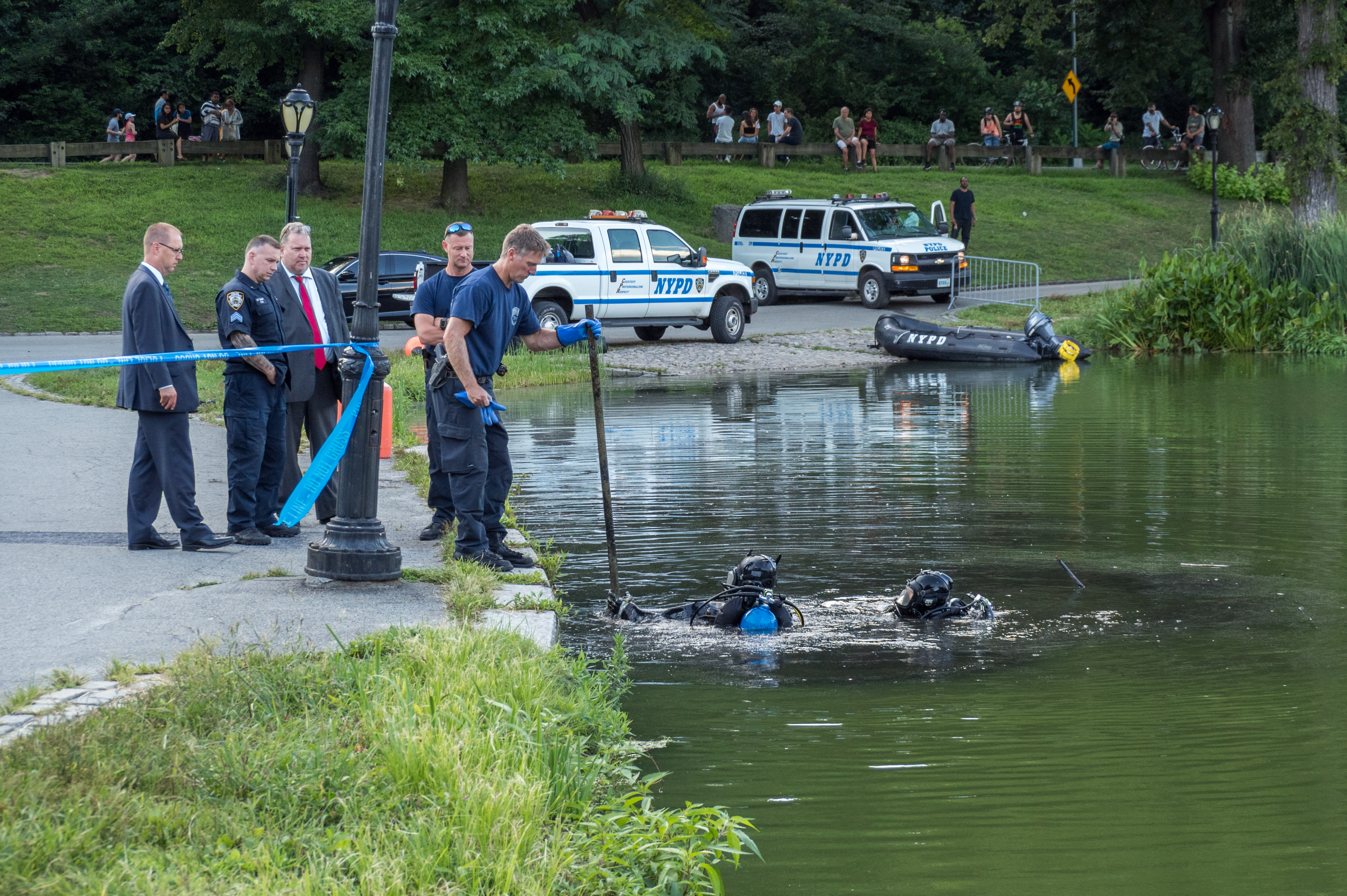
NYPD divers removing material from the Harlem Meer following a murder in the area few days prior.

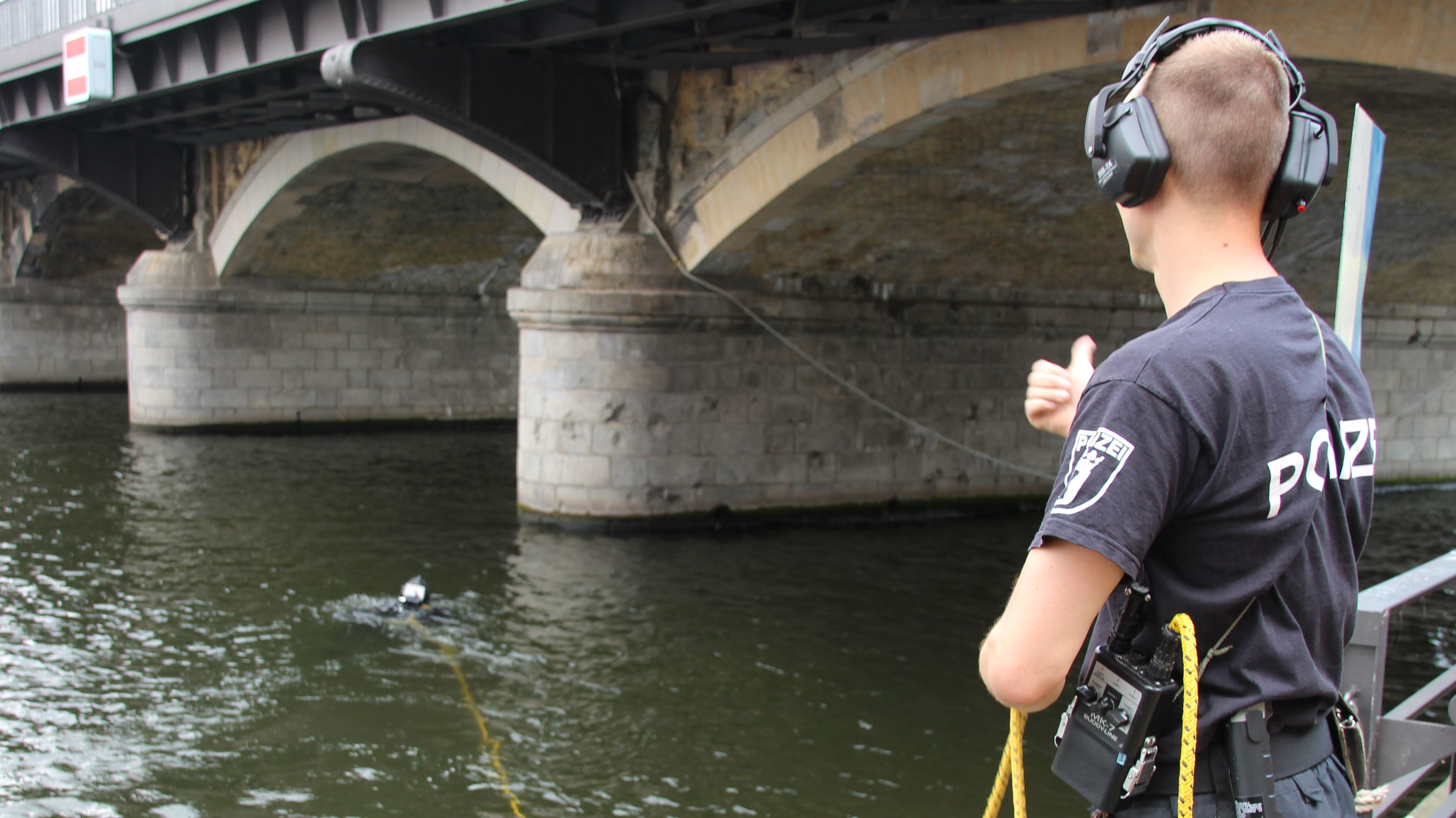
Police divers in a river in Berlin

Police diving is a branch of professional diving carried out by police services. Police divers are usually professional police officers, and may either be employed full-time as divers or as general water police officers, or be volunteers who usually serve in other units but are called in if their diving services are required.

The duties carried out by police divers include rescue diving for underwater casualties, under the general classification of public safety diving, and forensic diving, which is search and recovery diving for evidence and bodies.

== Scope ==
Police diving includes forensic diving – the recovery of evidence from underwater – and public safety diving. Police diving work may include:

- Underwater searches
- Evidence recovery
- Submerged body recoveries (from accidents/suicides/crime victims)
- Anti-narcotics operations (inspecting ships hulls etc.)
- Anti-terrorism operations (explosive ordnance disposal, defense against swimmer incursions)
- Search and rescue operations
- Other maritime law enforcement
- Removal of Motor Vehicles submerged in water
- Air-Sea rescue operations

=== Forensic diving ===
Forensic diving is professional diving work related to the gathering of evidence for use in investigations and legal cases. Police divers may be called in to investigate and recover evidence in plane crashes, submerged vehicles, boating accidents, suicides, homicides, swimming fatalities and other incidents and crimes. Forensic divers may face a number of environmental hazards from underwater structures and infrastructure, debris, industrial pollution, medical waste, organic hazards from various sources, shifting currents, poor visibility, hypothermia and hyperthermia, for which special equipment may be required to mitigate the risk. Other specialised equipment could include locating devices, access equipment, and transportation. Underwater recovery efforts may include the use of trained dogs, which can detect human remains underwater at depths as great as 150 metres (490 ft) feet in ideal conditions. Qualifications and training for forensic divers are additional to departmental physical and psychological requirements. Training may include instruction in stress management, media relations and teamwork.

Submerged evidence can have similar forensic value to evidence found above the water. Items recovered from immersion have been used as evidence in many cases where they have provided identifiable blood traces, fingerprints, hair and fibers, and other trace evidence. There are advantages to having a regional underwater investigation team available, but doing it well requires planning, administration, an adequate budget and due consideration of occupational health and safety issues. The working environment for underwater investigation includes a range of contaminated and inhospitable sites. Depending on the location and local procedural requirements, the teams may contain volunteers, firefighting and rescue personnel, or law enforcement personnel, and in some cases a collaboration of all of these. It is preferable that all members of an agency dive team be full-time, trained members of that agency for reasons of liability, training, policy and procedures. In some jurisdictions the required minimum certification is a recreational certification, in others an occupational qualification and registration may be stipulated. All members should be medically fit to dive, properly trained and competent to perform the tasks they may be assigned, and trained in matters of crime scene documentation and evidence handling and processing in an underwater environment.

=== Public safety diving ===
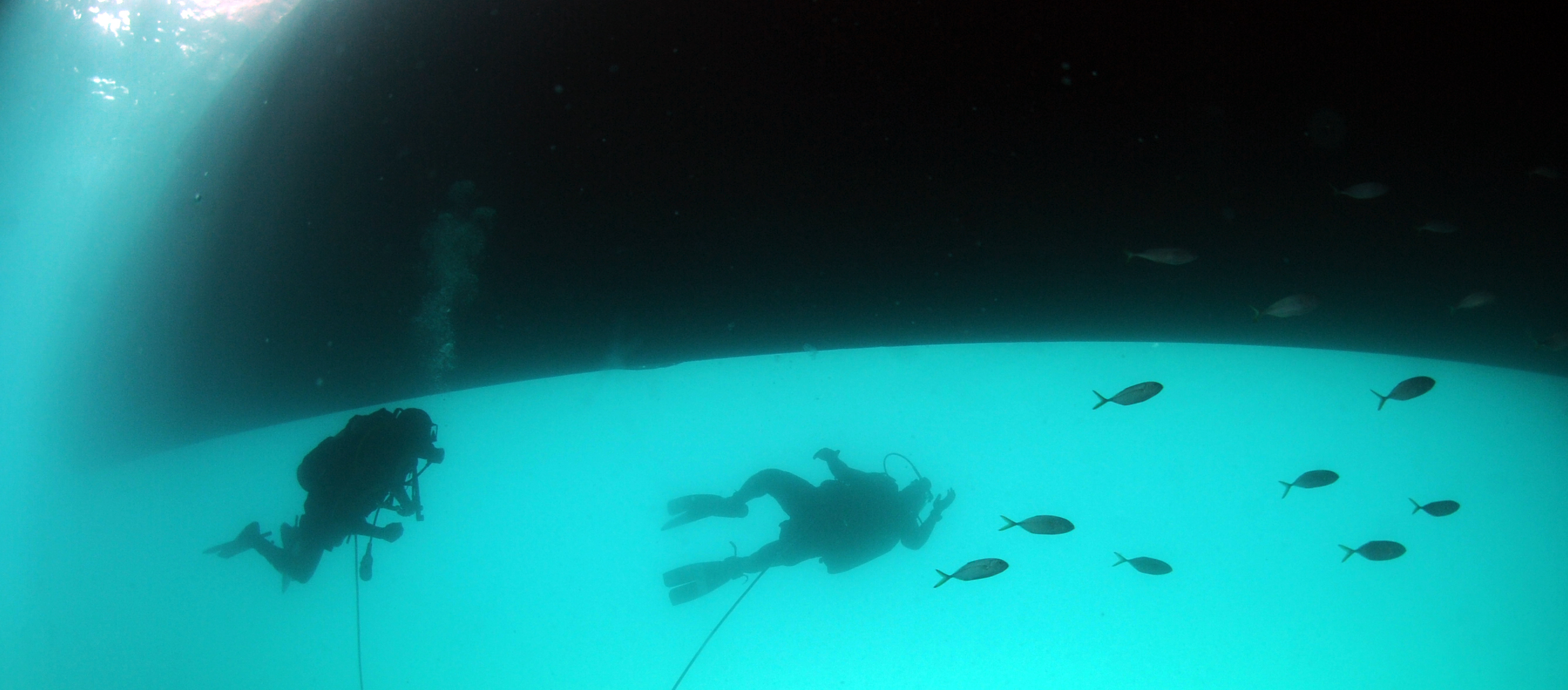
Dominica Marine police, maneuver under a Barbadian coast guard ship looking for an inert training explosive

"Public safety diving" is a term coined by Steven J Linton in the 1970s to describe underwater rescue, underwater recovery and underwater investigation conducted by divers working for or under the authority of municipal, state or federal agencies. These divers are typically members of police departments, sheriff's offices, fire rescue agencies, search and rescue teams or providers of emergency medical services. Public safety divers (PSDs) can be paid by the agencies employing them, or be non-paid volunteers.

=== Conditions ===
Due to the conditions in which accidents may happen, or where criminals may choose to dispose of evidence or their victims, police divers might need to dive under hostile environmental conditions which can include:

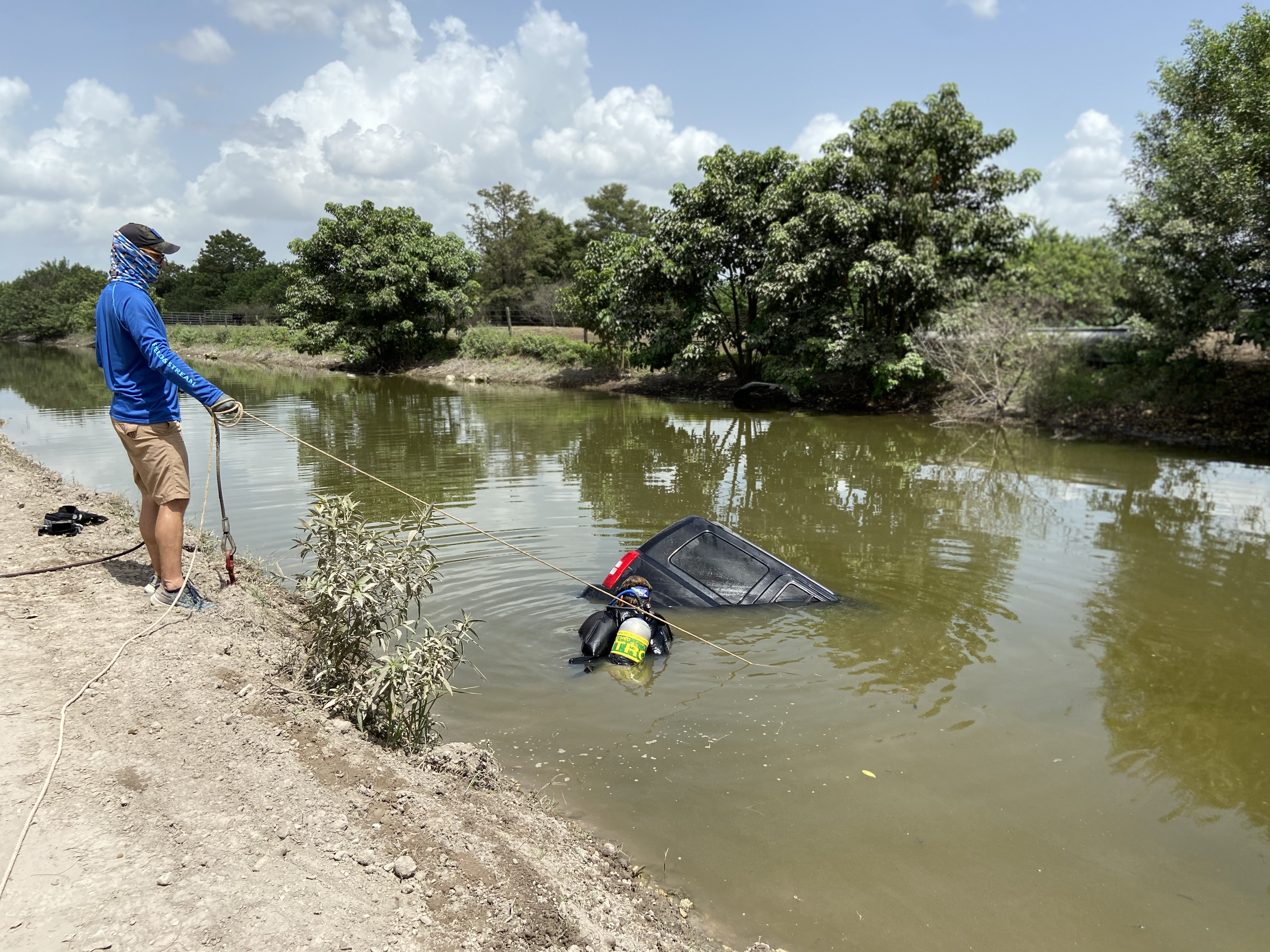
- Special Response Divers recovering a car from a canal in Miami, Fl
  In canals and rivers with strong flow
- In harbors and shipping lanes
- In intake pipes, sewers, culverts, and other enclosed spaces
- In bodies of water requiring high angle rope access
- In water towers with potable water
- Sludge, mud, debris or thick vegetation
- Under ice and in frigid water
- At night or with low visibility
- In rough seas and weather
- In water contaminated with toxins or parasites

As these dives may have to be done at short notice, department diving supervisors should be aware of the conditions and local hazards of the likely sites within their areas of operation, so that appropriate measures can be available when their team is called out.

== Qualifications and training ==
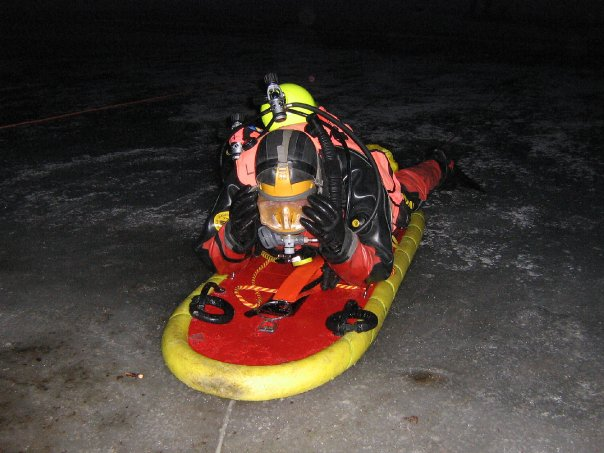
Nesconset FD Scuba rescue team surface ice rescue training

For professional police diving, the diver would in most cases be expected to be trained as a professional public safety diver, with specialized training in handling underwater forensic work. All the principles of land-based law enforcement work preserving and collecting evidence apply underwater.

More specialized training, depending on local requirements, may include airborne deployment of divers and gear, climbing and rappelling, cold water and ice diving, firearms training, night diving, operation of a recompression chamber, search management, surface-supplied air diving and diving voice communication systems, hazmat diving, and penetration diving.

=== United States ===
In the US, diving training agencies such as Emergency Response Diving International (ERDI), Special Response Diving International (SRDI), formally the National Academy of Police Diving, Team Lifeguard Systems, and Underwater Criminal Investigators have courses to train divers in public safety diving.

UCI (Underwater Criminal Investigators) was founded in 1987 to provide professional underwater criminal investigations training to the public safety diving community.

Special Response Diving International (SRDI) was formed in 1988 by a group of police divers to create a national standard for police and public safety diver training and certification in the US. It has helped provide public safety diver training for police officers, fire departments, military divers, and environmental investigators in the following locations: North America, Central America, Russia, Australia, and the Caribbean.

=== South Africa ===
In South Africa, public safety diving and police diving fall under the Diving Regulations of the Occupational Health and Safety Act, 1993, and such divers are required to be registered as commercial divers by the Department of Employment and Labor. Their basic diver training must be done through registered commercial diving schools. As they are professional police officers, they are also trained in police procedures.

=== Australia ===
The Australian Diver Accreditation Scheme (ADAS) includes accreditation for police diver training.

== Equipment ==
Some items of diving equipment have been designed or modified specifically for public safety diving, such as buoyancy compensator harnesses modified for helicopter lifts and swift water work, and for chemical resistance and HAZMAT conditions. Most equipment is standard scuba and surface supplied diving equipment suitable for the conditions in which it is to be used.

== History ==
In Britain, in the early years of the British Sub-Aqua Club (BSAC), police often called on BSAC branches to dive to find submerged bodies, before the police started their own diving branches.

== See also ==
- Scuba diving – Swimming underwater, breathing gas carried by the diver
- Professional diving – Underwater diving where divers are paid for their work
- Public safety diving – Underwater work done by law enforcement, rescue and search and recovery teams
- Diver rescue – Rescue of a distressed or incapacitated diver
