= Hazmat diving =

Underwater diving in a known hazardous materials environment

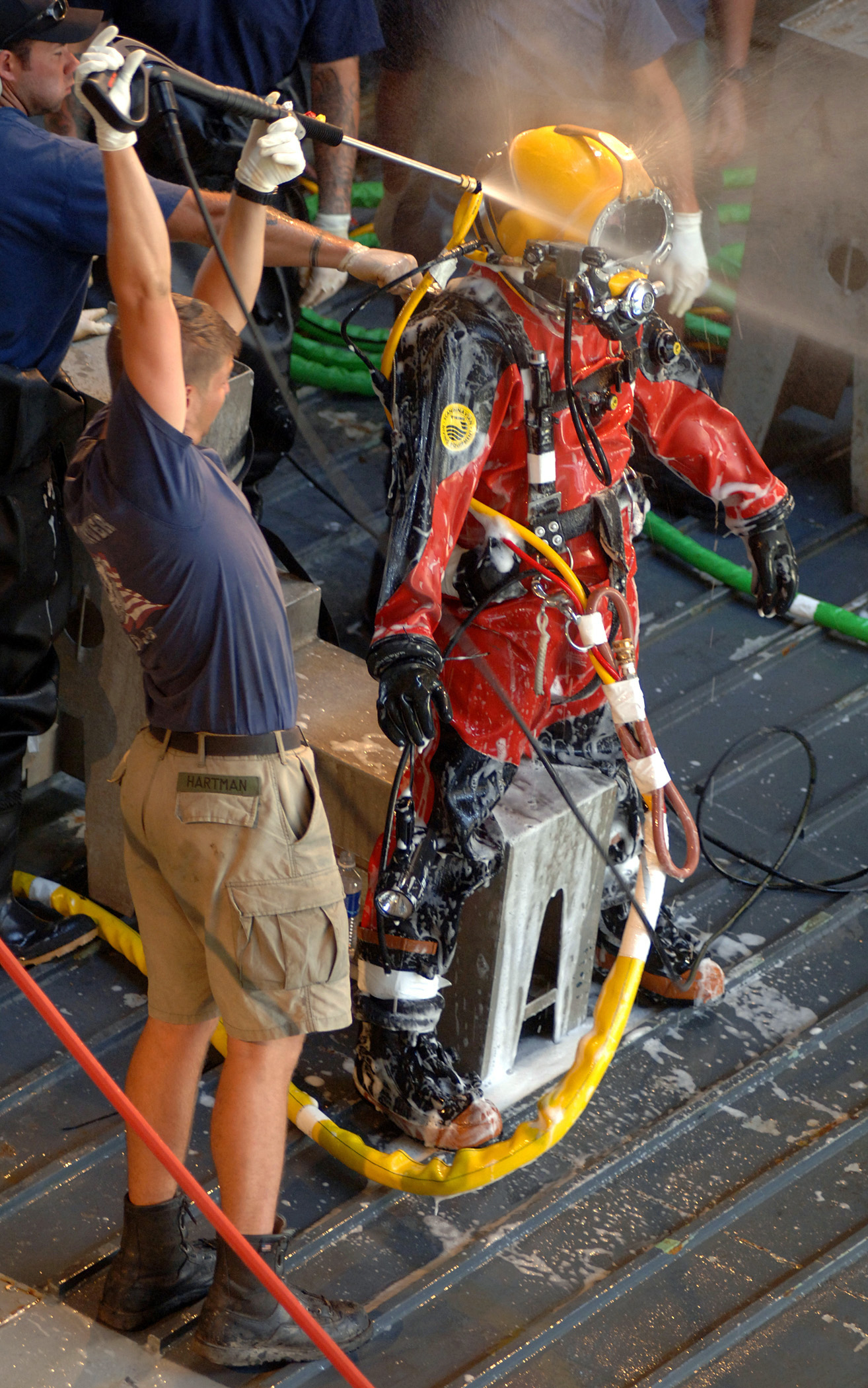
US Navy Diver being decontaminated after a dive. If the contamination was severe, the decontamination team would have been wearing hazmat gear.

Hazmat diving is underwater diving in a known hazardous materials environment. The environment may be contaminated by hazardous materials, the diving medium may be inherently a hazardous material, or the environment in which the diving medium is situated may include hazardous materials with a significant risk of exposure to these materials to members of the diving team. Special precautions, equipment and procedures are associated with hazmat diving so that the risk can be reduced to an acceptable level. These are based on preventing contact of the hazardous materials with the divers and other personnel, generally by encapsulating the affected personnel in personal protective equipment (PPE) appropriate to the hazard, and by effective decontamination after contact between the PPE and the hazardous materials.

There are a few well known environments, like nuclear power plant cooling systems, sewage treatment plants and sewers which require routine maintenance by divers, and which are well documented, with well-known and consistent hazards, for which standard operating procedures will have been developed, and other environments where the need for diving work is unusual and the hazards less well documented, and must be managed on a case-by-case basis, following an approved code of practice. Hazmat diving is a particular class of diving in high risk environments, normally only done by specially trained professional divers.

== Scope ==
Hazmat diving describes diving operations which involve risk of exposure to hazardous materials beyond the usual range encountered in professional diving operations, where special precautions must be taken to reduce and mitigate the risks of exposure to these materials. Hazmat diving implies that specialized equipment will be required to dive at an acceptable level of risk. A large part of hazmat diving is contaminated water diving, where the water is contaminated with materials that would be hazardous to health if they come into direct contact with the diver.

== Contaminants ==
- Biological
  - Pathogens, including blood-borne pathogens and human remains.
- Toxins
  - Industrial and other chemical contaminants
    - Hydrocarbons
    - Heavy metals
    - Polychlorinated biphenyls (PCBs)
- Biological and chemical warfare agents
- Radioactive materials
  - Radiation from nuclear power sources
  - Radioactive materials from nuclear weapons

== Equipment ==
Most equipment used for hazmat diving is similar to other professional diving equipment, but may be modified to limit the risk of direct exposure of the diver and support personnel to the hazardous materials known or suspected to be present. The equipment appropriate to a hazmat diving operation will depend on the nature of the hazardous materials present and their potential effect on the diving team, and also to legislative constraints and the recommendations or requirements of codes of practice and organisational guidelines. The legal constraints commonly only allow the use of surface supplied diving equipment – scuba equipment is generally not permitted for hazmat diving.

One of the features common to hazmat diving equipment is breathing gas exhaust systems that minimise the risk of backflow of contamination through the exhaust valves into the helmet. Most of these systems provide a slight over-pressure inside the helmet to prevent backflow in addition to non-return valves.

- Positive pressure full-face mask: – this system maintains a slightly higher internal pressure inside the mask so that any leakage will be outward. Generally only used for low risk contamination.
- Redundant exhaust valves: – Full-face masks and helmets can be fitted with exhaust systems in which the gas must pass through two valves in series to reach the outside environment, and therefore contaminants must pass through both sets of valves to get into the helmet.
- Free-flow breathing gas supply: – A supply of breathing gas in excess of the divers needs ensures that there is always an outward flow through the exhaust system, and reduces the risk of contaminated liquid getting in against the flow.
- Exhaust to atmosphere: – A reclaim type helmet which has an exhaust regulator can be used. The exhaled gas is not reclaimed but is returned to the atmosphere above the contaminated water via an exhaust hose in the umbilical. The reclaim exhaust valve prevents helmet squeeze by preventing exhaust flow except when there is a slight overpressure inside the helmet.

The material of the diving suit should be selected for best resistance to the contaminants, and ease of decontamination. In some cases the suit may only be able to safely resist the chemical attack of the contaminants for a limited period, and in some cases may have to be discarded after a single use.

Dry suits are used to isolate the diver from the diving medium, and the helmet may be directly sealed to the suit. The suit is more easily decontaminated if it has a slick outer surface. Gloves will generally be integral parts of the suit to reduce the risk of leaks at cuff joints. Automatic suit dump valves are an additional potential leak and may be omitted from the suit if the helmet is directly sealed to the suit.

Where there may be atmospheric contamination in the vicinity of the dive site, both main and reserve breathing gas supply will be from high pressure storage cylinders.

The standby diver should wear the same level of personal environmental protection as the working diver, as any emergency is likely to occur in the same contaminated environment.

== Procedures ==
The procedures used in hazmat diving depend on the specific hazard and the assessed risks to health and safety of the diving team. Most of the diving procedures are common to the same mode of diving in uncontaminated conditions. The major differences are in encapsulation level, post dive decontamination, and health monitoring and screening.

=== Risk management ===
Besides the ordinary hazards of the underwater environment and the special hazards of the specific dive site, the hazmat diving team must deal with the exceptional hazards of the contaminants that are classed as hazardous materials to which they may be exposed during a diving operation. The three major classes of pollutants are chemical, biological and radioactive materials, and the risks associated with them vary considerably.

The first stage of assessing the risk of a hazmat dive is to identify the contaminants present and assess the possible consequences of exposure and the type of equipment that may be used to protect the personnel, particularly the divers. Risk management will include assessing possible modes of contamination, available protective equipment, consequences of exposure, methods of mitigation, level of risk, and post dive health monitoring, as it is often not possible to exclude the possibility of contamination having occurred despite all precautions, particularly with pathogens.

=== Decontamination ===
The route to and from the contaminated environment will pass through a decontamination station. After exiting the water all equipment will be decontaminated at this point before proceeding further. The decontamination procedures and precautions will depend on the nature of the hazardous materials to which the equipment has been exposed.

Decontamination may begin with a washdown with fresh water to remove the bulk of contamination. This may occur at the first convenient opportunity, including hosing down as the diver exits the water. The diver is then more comprehensively decontaminated using materials appropriate to the specific contaminants. The decontamination team may be at risk during decontamination procedures, and will wear suitable protection while in the decontamination area. Decontamination will start with the diver still fully dressed in all equipment, so it is necessary to work quickly and systematically to minimise the time the diver is required to endure the process. Particular attention is given to the sealing areas between helmet and suit, as these can trap contaminants and expose the diver to contact when the helmet is removed. Precautions are taken to contain and properly dispose of decontamination fluids. The decontamination team must be appropriately competent in the required procedures and equipment.

The diver will be stripped of diving equipment and suit by the decontamination team and will then go through a decontamination shower, or in some cases two showers in isolated compartments in series, followed by a medical examination and neurological survey, depending on the hazardous materials involved. Diving equipment must also be adequately decontaminated, and in some cases it may be necessary to dispose of equipment.

=== Health monitoring and screening of personnel ===
Screening, in medicine, is a strategy used to look for as-yet-unrecognised conditions or risk markers. Medical screening may be required by occupational health legislation when diving is done in contaminated environments.

== Specific environments and associated hazards ==
=== Nuclear diving ===
Nuclear diving is a kind of hazmat diving; the distinguishing feature is the exposure to radiation instead of a water borne contaminant. To this end, different precautions are required for nuclear diving, mainly, equipment which will not absorb radioactive contamination and pose a disposal problem after several dives. Moreover, exhaustive briefing of the group or diver for the specific environment he is going to work, depth, water temperature and potential radioactive sources. Heat stress can also be a danger for the diver, in which case a cold water suit may be used: the cold water suit is a special canvas coverall which floods the outside of the diver's drysuit with chilled water, countering the dangerously high ambient water temperature. A dosimeter is used to ensure that the diver does not accumulate a dangerous dose of radiation during the dive, assisting in calculating the maximum length of the dive. In addition the dosimeter can also be used to find radiation hot spots, which can indicate areas in need of repair.

=== Sewer diving ===
Sewer diving is one of the most dangerous of all the hazmat jobs due to the disease vectors carried by raw sewage and because hypodermic needles and broken glass may contaminate the raw sewage, creating risks of contracting diseases through cuts and punctures.

Divers working in a dangerously contaminated environment wear a full drysuit with integral boots. Cut-resistant dry-gloves and helmet will seal directly to the drysuit, leaving no skin exposed to the environment. The diver will generally use a free-flow diving helmet which continually supplies more air than the diver needs to breathe so that there is a constant outflow through the exhaust valve, as the internal pressure must be slightly higher than ambient to maintain the flow. A free-flow helmet has a significantly lower risk of leakage back through the exhaust valve compared to a standard demand helmet where the exhaust valve must maintain a watertight seal against a slightly higher external pressure during inhalation. The risk of leakage through the exhaust valve of a demand system can be reduced in three ways. A series system of valves can be used - the exhaust gases must pass through two or three sets of exhaust valves before reaching the contaminated environment, and therefore contaminated water would have to leak back through all sets of valves to get to the diver. Positive pressure systems maintain a slightly higher pressure inside the mask or helmet than the ambient pressure on the outside, ensuring that any leaks flow from inside to outside, and reclaim type helmets duct the exhaled breathing gas back to the control panel on the surface, but do not necessarily reclaim the exhaust gas. Combinations of these methods are possible depending on the assessed risk.

The drysuit will be made from a material resistant to the hazardous materials at the site: normally the diver wears a vulcanized rubber drysuit, which is relatively easy to decontaminate as it has a slick outer surface, but occasionally a neoprene or trilaminate suit is needed. Often, a diver will wear extra protection over the drysuit to reduce the risk of a puncture: leather, PVC and nylon coveralls are used for this purpose.

In such diving, light levels are often very low and the water is usually very turbid, so divers may rely on touch to guide them and to do their work, and they are connected via the umbilical to the surface. The umbilical serves as a supply of breathing gas, for communications, and as a lifeline to find and retrieve the diver in an emergency. It is also used as a guide to find the way back to the surface and exit point.

== Risk and safety ==
Hazmat diving carries unique risks, primarily from exposure of the diver to hazardous materials. Statistics show these dangers include chemical, biological, and radiological threats, with varying incident frequencies and injury types. Advanced safety protocols and technology have improved diver safety over time. Choice of appropriate equipment must take into account compatibility of the equipment materials with the specific environment, as some contaminants are incompatible with some of the materials out of which the equipment may be manufactured. The requirement for encapsulation of the diver can introduce a greater risk of overheating in warm conditions.

== Training and registration ==
Hazmat diving is usually done by professional divers, trained and registered as competent in the use of surface supplied equipment, who have been further trained and assessed to be competent in the use of the specific equipment suitable for the environment and the associated procedures. There is not usually an additional registration for hazmat diving, and it is the responsibility of the diver and the employer to ensure that the diver is competent for any specific diving operation. This is commonly recorded in the diver's logbook and the contractor's personnel files for reference.

== Legislation and codes of practice ==
Regulations for hazmat diving are extensive, encompassing international and national laws. They mandate specific training, equipment standards, and emergency procedures, evolving with new hazards and technological advancements. Compliance ensures improved safety and environmental protection in this high-risk field.
