= Diving team =

Group of people working together to enhance dive safety and achieve a task

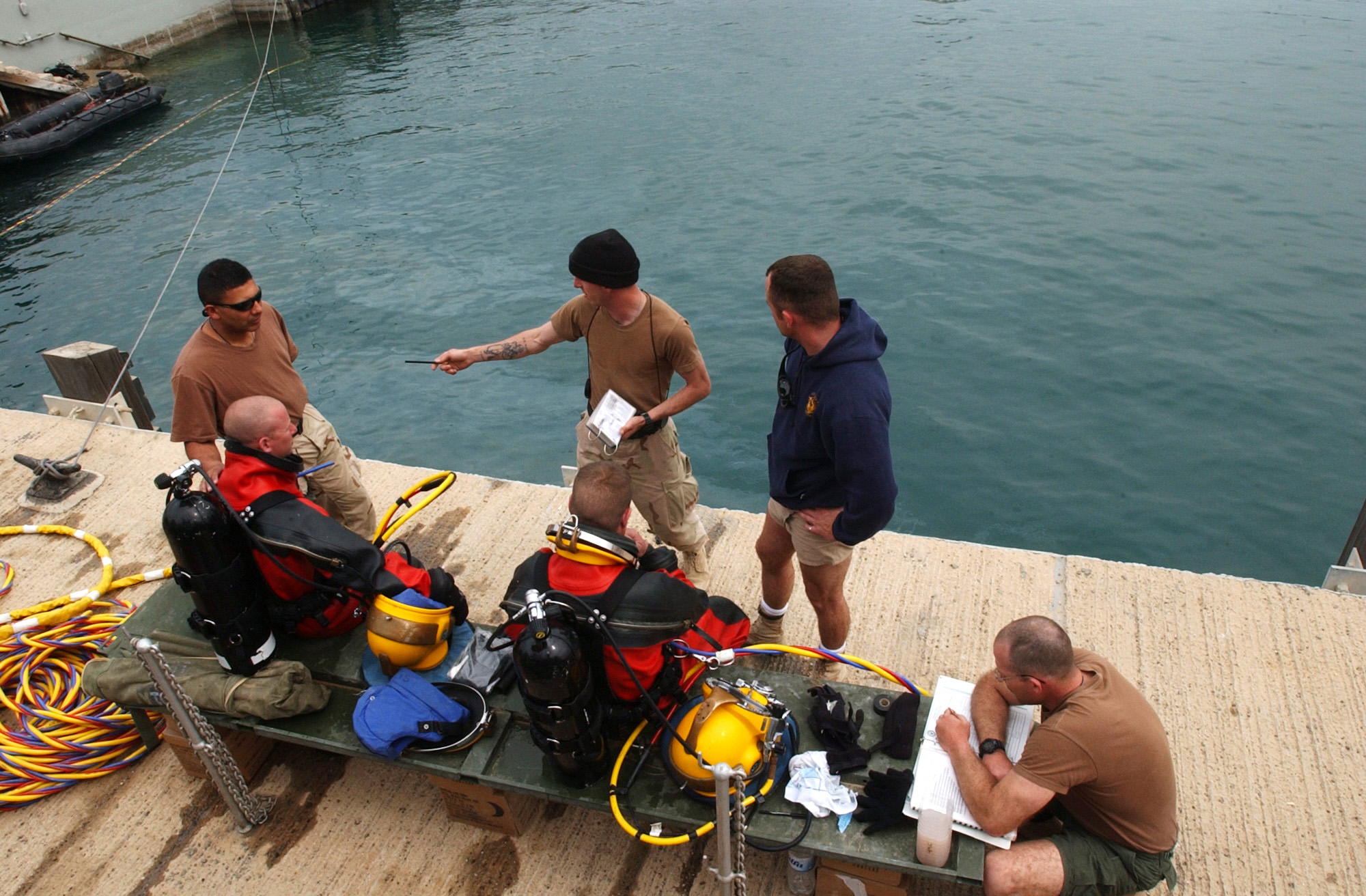
A dive team listens to a safety brief from their dive supervisor

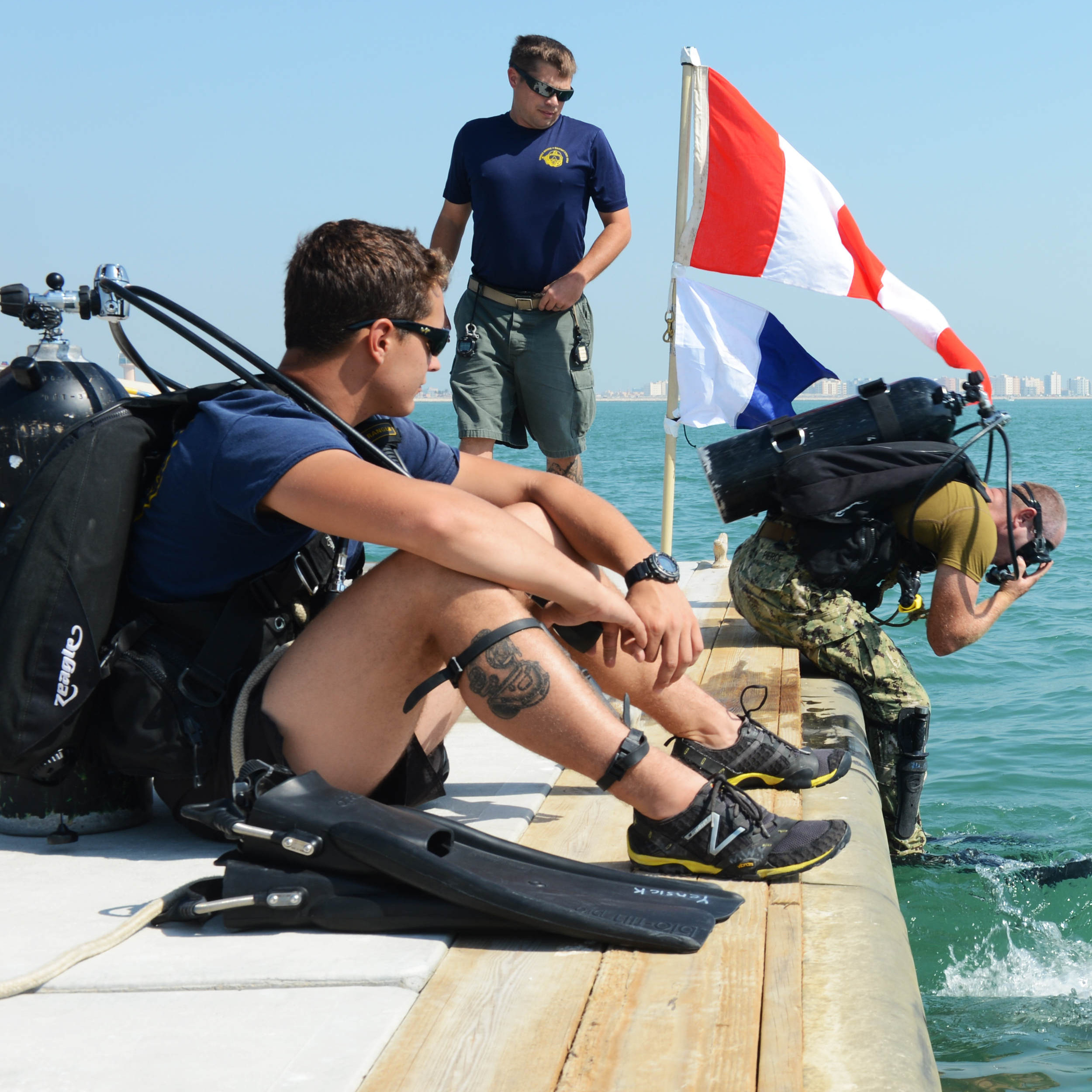
Minimal professional diving team, with standby diver, supervisor and working diver entering the water

A diving team is a group of people who work together to conduct a diving operation. A characteristic of professional diving is the specification for minimum personnel for the diving support team. This typically specifies the minimum number of support team members and their appointed responsibilities in the team based on the circumstances and mode of diving, and the minimum qualifications for specified members of the diving support team. The minimum team requirements may be specified by regulation or code of practice. Some specific appointments within a professional dive team have defined competences and registration may be required.

There is considerable difference in the diving procedures of professional divers, where a diving team with formally appointed members in specific roles and with recognised competence is required by law, and recreational diving, where in most jurisdictions the diver is not constrained by specific laws, and in many cases is not required to provide any evidence of competence. In recreational diving there may be no team at all for a solo diver, a dive buddy is the default arrangement, a three diver team is fairly common for technical diving, and a major technical dive or expedition may have a fairly complex team including surface support personnel made up to suit the requirements of the dive plan. Recreational diving instructors often use an assistant to increase the number of learners they can safely manage in the water, and dive guides may use an assistant to help keep the group together and assist the customers in an emergency.

The members of a diving team are part of a larger class of diving support personnel, which includes diving instructors, equipment maintenance technicians, operators of equipment and vessels used in support of a diving operation, and specialised medical staff.

== Professional diving ==
Professional divers operate as a team. The minimum composition of the team is usually specified by some combination of national, federal or state regulations, standing orders, codes of practice, and operations manual.

=== Core diving team ===
These are the personnel that are generally required to be present at a professional dive site during the diving operation.

==== Working diver ====
Also referred to as 'the diver', this is the person who does the underwater work planned for the dive. There may be more than one working diver, and the working diver and bellman may alternate during a dive. Diving skills required depend on the mode of diving and equipment used, and work skills required depend on the job to be done. A working diver is by default necessary for a diving operation. Without the diver there is no diving operation.

==== Diving supervisor ====
The diving supervisor is the professional diving team member who is directly responsible for the diving operation's safety and the management of any incidents or accidents that may occur during the operation; the supervisor is required to be available at the control point of the diving operation for the diving operation's duration, and to manage the planned dive and any contingencies that may occur.

Details of competence, requirements, qualifications, registration and formal appointment differ depending on jurisdiction and relevant codes of practice. Diving supervisors are used in commercial diving, military diving, public safety diving and scientific diving operations. A diving supervisor is required for every diving operation. The supervisor must remain in the control area and be in control at all times during the diving operation. This generally implies being able to communicate with the divers and other team members.

==== Standby diver ====
The diver who is at all times during the dive ready to go to the assistance of the working diver and perform a rescue to recover the diver to the surface if necessary. Diving competence requirements are identical to those of the working diver, but underwater work skills are not relevant while acting as standby diver. In surface oriented diving the standby diver may wait at the diving operation control point, and in saturation diving the bellman is the standby diver, though an additional surface standby diver may be required to assist with technical problems at shallow depths. A standby diver is required for every diving operation, though in some circumstances two working divers may act as standby to each other when working in close proximity, in an arrangement similar to the buddy system.

==== Diver's tender ====
The diver's tender, or dive attendant, is a person who may or may not be a qualified diver who assists the diver or standby diver to dress in and out, assists them entering and exiting the water, boarding the stage or wet bell, and manages the diver's umbilical at the surface where applicable. The bellman acts as the working diver's umbilical attendant from a wet or closed bell.

In some circumstances, when untethered scuba is used, there may not be a requirement for a tender, and appropriate assistance may be provided by one of the other team members. In other cases, where the working diver is required to enter a confined space underwater, an additional underwater tender may be needed to handle the diver's umbilical at the entrance or other place where the risk of snagging is high. In some cases the stand-by diver may do this job. In these cases the underwater tender must be a suitably equipped and qualified diver, and will generally also need a surface tender in addition to the working diver's surface tender.

==== Diving medical practitioner ====
A registered diving medical practitioner (DMP) competent to manage diving injuries may be required to be available on standby off-site during diving operations. The DMP should have certified skills and basic practical experience in assessment of medical fitness to dive, management of diving accidents, safety planning for professional diving operations, advanced life support, acute trauma care and general wound care. Depending on jurisdiction, a DMP may be required on telephonic standby for all commercial diving operations. For mixed gas and saturation diving the DMP should be competent to manage treatment for injuries associated with that class of diving.

=== Additional members depending on circumstances ===
The use of more complex equipment or diving modes may necessitate the inclusion of additional members in the diving team. Some of these are required to be registered operators, others are only required to be competent at their allocated tasks.

==== Compressor operator ====
For surface-supplied air diving using a low pressure compressor a competent person is needed to set up, start run and check the compressor and air delivery to the distribution panel. There may also be a high-pressure compressor for filling scuba cylinders and high pressure reserve air cylinders for divers or decompression chambers, and this too should be operated by a competent person.

==== Bellman ====
If an open or closed bell which provides gas to the diver from a bell panel is to be used to convey the divers to the worksite, a bellman is required. The bellman is a diver who acts as standby diver and diver's attendant from the bell during the dive, and may alternate as working diver during the dive if appropriately competent for the diving task. The bellman normally stays in the bell during the dive and operates the bell gas panel, but may be required to leave the bell to go to the assistance of the working diver, recover a disabled diver to the bell and provide first aid in the bell. Diving competence requirements are identical to those of the working diver, but underwater work skills are not relevant while acting as the bellman. Diver competence for bell operations includes competence at all skills required of the bellman.

==== Launch and recovery system operator ====
A competent person responsible for operating the bell or stage lifting winch and launch and recovery system (LARS) is needed when such equipment is used. This is not a diving post.

==== Chamber operator ====
A chamber operator is needed if there is a decompression chamber on site. The chamber operator is a person competent to operate a hyperbaric chamber with a compressed air atmosphere under the direction of a diving supervisor. This is not a diving post, but the chamber operator may also be a diver, and many surface supplied air divers are also qualified as chamber operators. The chamber operator is competent to prepare the chamber for an operation, blow it down to depth, communicate with the occupants and the supervisor, operate the main and medical locks, provide decompression gases on the built-in breathing system, monitor and maintain the chamber atmosphere composition and pressure within the prescribed limits, manage contingencies, decompress to follow a specified surface decompression or recompression treatment schedule, and perform basic maintenance procedures, including cleaning and inspecting the components for correct function.

==== Gas man ====
A gas man, also called gas panel operator, or rack operator, is required when gas mixtures other than air are to be provided to the diver. This person controls the gas supply to the diver and may also handle communications as a direct assistant to the supervisor. The gas man may also be a diver, but the specific activity is not a diving post.

==== Diving medical technician ====
A diving medical technician is necessary where the diving operation is remote from hospital facilities, such as in offshore work. A diver medic or diving medical technician (DMT) is a member of a dive team who is trained in advanced first aid. A Diver Medic recognised by IMCA must be capable of administering first aid and emergency treatment, and carrying out the directions of a doctor pending the arrival of more skilled medical aid, and therefore must be able to effectively communicate with a doctor who is not on site, and be familiar with diving procedures and compression chamber operation. The Diver Medic must also be able to assist the diving supervisor with decompression procedures, provide advice as to when more specialised medical help should be requested, and must be fit to provide treatment in a hyperbaric chamber in an emergency, and must therefore hold a valid certificate of medical fitness to dive. The diver medic may also be a diver, but this is not a diving appointment. Training standards for Diver Medic are described in the IMCA Scheme for Recognition of Diver Medic Training.

==== Systems technician ====
A person competent to maintain, repair and test the function of the diving and support systems and components for which they are appointed as systems technician. A systems technician would typically be required for a team operating a saturation system, or a surface supplied diving operation with a significant amount of support equipment, or relatively complex support equipment, or where a large number of dives are planned, and on-site maintenance and repair work is likely to be needed. This is not a diving appointment, though the technician may also be a diver.

==== Diving superintendent ====
The diving superintendent is the management position covering diving operations. The superintendent is usually a qualified supervisor, but depending on the organisation, may not be required to supervise dives. The superintendent may oversee saturation and surface oriented diving operations on air or mixed gases, develop and implement dive plans and diving related company procedures and manage diving related activities to minimise health, safety and environmental risks and impacts. This is not a diving appointment and the superintendent may not be directly involved in the actual diving operations.

==== Life-support technician ====
A life support technician is a person registered as competent to operate the life-support systems of a mixed gas saturation diving system. Divers living in saturation conditions must be continuously monitored and the pressure, oxygen and carbon dioxide content of their breathing gas, and temperature and humidity of the environment must be monitored and controlled. Functions such as feeding and sewage disposal and locking stores and equipment into and out of the chambers are also controlled from outside by life support personnel. Responsibilities include communication with the divers in saturation, supervising transfer of personnel into and out of the accommodation chambers, maintaining the hyperbaric rescue craft and hyperbaric evacuation of the divers in an emergency. This is a non-diving post.

==== Life-support supervisor ====
The life support supervisor is a senior life support technician appointed by the diving contractor to supervise operation of the saturation life support systems. This is a non-diving post.

=== ROV team ===
Whenever a remotely operated underwater vehicle is operated at a dive site when a diving operation is taking place, competent personnel are required to run the ROV, and as the safety of the divers is affected, the ROV team is under the authority of the diving supervisor. The ROV can be both a hazard because of its mass, power and moving parts, and a benefit to diver safety, as it can monitor the divers on closed circuit video, and give some kinds of assistance in contingencies. There are a range of tasks where a ROV is more suitable than a diver, and others which a diver can do better. The ROV team are not necessarily divers, though it is possible. ROV operation requires a different set of skills and knowledge to diving.

==== ROV pilot ====
A person trained and competent to operate a remotely controlled underwater vehicle. In diving operations the pilot must be competent to safely operate the ROV with divers in the water. ROV pilots are usually also trained in routine maintenance and minor repair of the ROV.

==== ROV supervisor ====
A senior ROV pilot appointed to supervise the ROV team. The ROV supervisor is under the authority of the diving supervisor when divers are in the water, but may work autonomously when there is no diving taking place.

== Legal status ==
When the minimum personnel in a diving team is regulated in terms of national or state legislation, the legal status and responsibilities of the members is generally defined in the legislation. These responsibilities often relate to occupational safety and health and specify a duty of care for the team members.

== Recreational and technical diving ==
In mainstream recreational diving, team diving is the exception. Support functions are carried out by operators such as dive boat charter operators, dive shops and dive schools, for their customers, on a commercial basis. Duty of care may be specifically limited by terms of use and waivers. Groups of divers may also associate in clubs and informal groups to finance or otherwise provide mutual services such as boats and filling facilities, and may dive together in informal groups. Club members may provide training and dive leadership to other club members, often on a not-for-profit cost sharing basis.

Technical divers may form teams where this is appropriate to support each other for complex or hazardous dives. This can include surface co-coordinators, equipment handlers, gas blenders, support and standby divers, and any other function that may seem useful to them. The team members are not usually contractually bound and have no duty of care beyond what they may have voluntarily assumed and that of ordinary citizens. The divers remain responsible for their own assumption of risk and are not under the direction of anyone other than themselves and the dive plan by group consensus. Technical divers may also refer to team diving where a group of three divers assume the roles of dive buddies to each other.

- Primary dive team or diver is the diver or group of divers who will take part in the main dive. For example, the diver or divers who intend to explore new territory in a cave, penetrate a wreck, or attempt a depth record.
- Support divers may place and recover drop cylinders, meet returning divers at per-arranged depths, provide support to decompressing divers by relaying communications with the surface team, or assisting divers in the water.
- Stand-by divers are support divers at the surface ready to go to the assistance of team members in the water when requested
- Surface co-ordinators are team members who keep track of team activities and assist in scheduling and recording the dive and support activities.

=== Team redundancy ===
In complex dive operations such as deep cave penetrations, technical divers will often use team redundancy to limit the amount of equipment carried. The concept is that equipment that is important to safety, but has a very low risk of failure does not have to be backed up by every member. Dive computers are team redundant when two divers each have one if they both dive the same profile on the same gases, one spare mask is considered sufficient, as they very seldom break or get lost, fin straps, cutting tools and the like may be also be considered sufficiently backed up if one spare is carried by the team. Backup gas may also be shared, as may a backup scooter. Sometimes the team members will each carry backup. Backup lights and gas are commonly carried by each member, but are available to be shared if necessary. As a general rule, once team redundancy has been exhausted and no spares are left, the dive is turned, so sometimes more spares are carried so that a single item failure does not prevent the operation from being completed. Much of the DIR philosophy is based on facilitating team redundancy. To be effective, the redundant team equipment must be available to any member of the team in time to safely mitigate the loss of function of the original item.

== Freediving ==
=== Buddy teams ===
The buddy system is recommended by freediver training agencies and schools for risk management by freedivers as they are at risk of hypoxic blackout for various reasons, and a competent buddy following recommended procedures may be able to intervene successfully.

The buddy system is a procedure in which two individuals, the "buddies", operate together as a team so that they are able to monitor and help each other.

Appropriate training is recommended as the most effective way to develop the necessary competence, which includes both knowledge and practical experience, and understanding of personal limitations. Certification is provided as evidence that a diver has been trained and was assessed as competent within the scope of the certification. It is also necessary to be sufficiently fit for the planned dives at the time. Training in first aid with CPR is also recommended.

Three-diver teams can also be effective in freediving.

=== Competition safety ===
Following the deaths of two freedivers in competitions, AIDA has a system set up for monitoring and if necessary, recovering competitors who lose consciousness underwater. As of 2022 the incidence of adverse events in depth competitions varies between 3 and 4%, This rate is considered relatively low and is expected during competitions where divers push their breath-hold limits. Almost all of these divers are successfully assisted and recover completely. There is a much lower incidence of more serious injuries due to the established safety system at the competitions.

==== Safety divers ====
The safety team is usually made up of volunteers, but in major events may be paid staff. The work can be challenging as many dives are done in a day. The safety diver will descend in time to meet the competitor during their ascent, and monitor them for the rest of the ascent. They will intervene if necessary, typically by securing the airway and swimming them up to the surface. There is usually a rotating team of safety divers to ensure that they are not overtasked. Each competitor is monitored by a team of several breath hold safety divers. The first will meet the diver at somewhere around 1/3 to 1/4 of the target depth, usually with a maximum of 30m The second will meet them about 10m shallower, and a third will be on standby in case of an emergency.

In case of a deeper incident, the competitor is clipped to the downline, which can be rapidly raised by the surface support team, which includes a medical support group.
