= Public safety diving =

Underwater work done by law enforcement, rescue and search and recovery teams

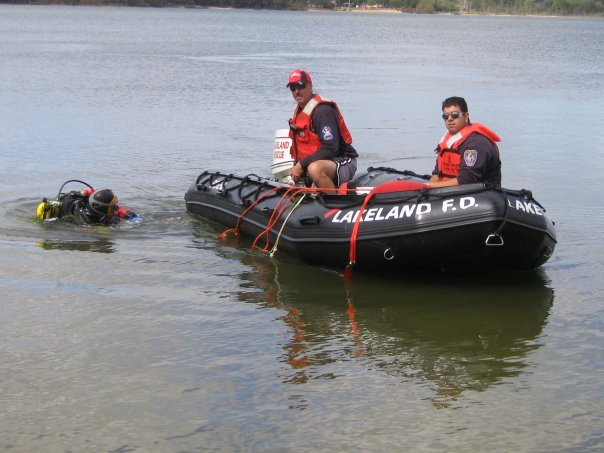
Nesconset fire department scuba rescue team on training exercise

Public safety diving is underwater diving conducted as part of law enforcement and fire/rescue. Public safety divers differ from recreational, scientific and commercial divers who can generally plan the date, time, and location of a dive, and dive only if the conditions are conducive to the task. Public safety divers respond to emergencies 24 hours a day, 7 days a week, and may be required to dive in the middle of the night, during inclement weather, in zero visibility "black water," or in waters polluted by chemicals and biohazards.

== Specialized skills ==
In addition to basic diving skills training, public safety divers require specialized training for recognizing hazards, conducting risk assessments, search procedures, diving in zero visibility, using full-face masks with communication systems, and recovering evidence that is admissible in court. Some of the water they are required to dive in is contaminated, and they may be required to wear vulcanized drysuits, with diving helmets sealed to the suit, and utilize surface supplied air. At times, the decontamination process that takes place out of the water can be longer than the dive time.

== Public safety diving personnel ==
In the US, many public safety divers are volunteers, but career law enforcement or fire/rescue personnel also often take on these additional responsibilities as part of their occupation. Firefighters will find the diving equipment has similarities to the full face masks and breathing apparatus worn in smoke filled environments.

Law enforcement personnel are also trained as public safety divers because of their training and experience in handling evidence and presenting evidence in court.

== Training and qualifications ==
Depending on the jurisdiction, public safety divers may be required to be registered as commercial divers, or may be trained specifically as public safety divers by specialists, or may be initially trained as recreational divers, then given additional specialist training.

In addition to basic diving skills training, public safety divers require specialized training for recognizing hazards, conducting risk assessments, search procedures, diving in zero visibility, using full-face masks with communication systems, and recovering evidence that is admissible in court. Some of the water they are required to dive in is contaminated, and they may be required to wear vulcanized drysuits, with diving helmets sealed to the suit, and utilize surface-supplied air. At times, the decontamination process that takes place out of the water can take longer than the dive time.

== Health and safety aspects ==
=== Jurisdiction ===
==== United States ====
Depending on state legislation, public safety divers in the USA may fall under state or federal occupational safety and health legislation. Federal legislation applies where there is no relevant state legislation and the divers are employees diving as part of their occupation. If they fall under federal legislation they are exempt (excluded) from specific requirements of 29 CFR Part 1910, Subpart T, Commercial Diving Operations, only during diving activities incidental to police and public-safety functions the purpose of which is to provide search, rescue, or public-safety diving services. The exemption was written to include the ability to deviate from safe diving practices under limited conditions where compliance would be impracticable due to time constraints or the possible consequences of failing to perform the task overwhelm the risks taken using available facilities. This exclusion does not apply during training, recovery operations, searches where there is no reasonable probability of rescue of a living person or there is no real and immediate public safety hazard. The specific federal legislation does not apply to volunteers where there is no employer/employee relationship.

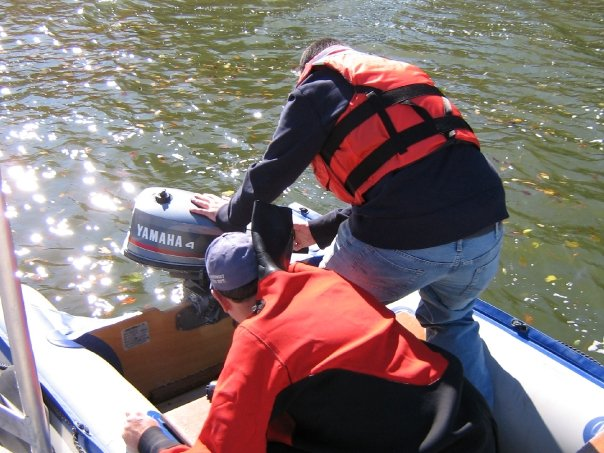

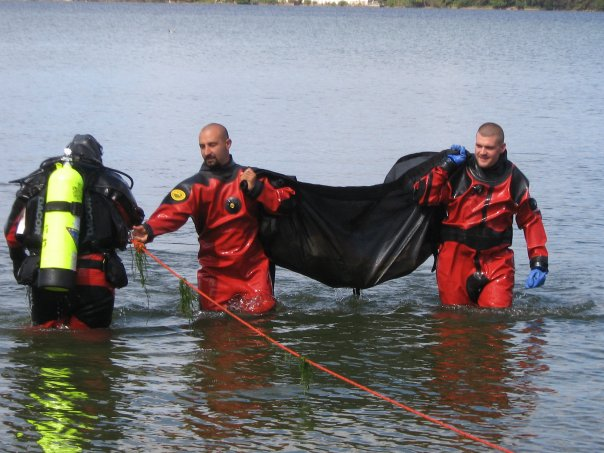

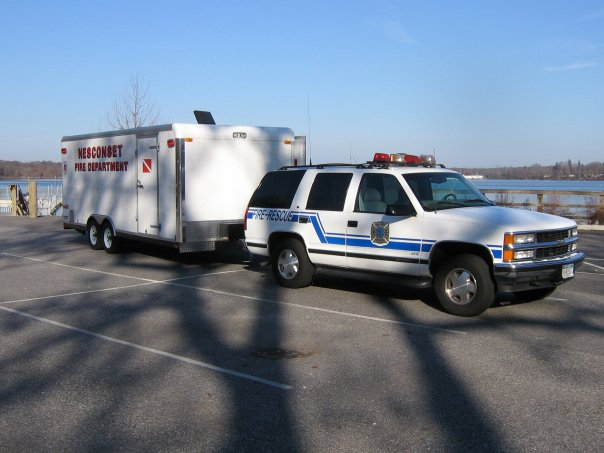

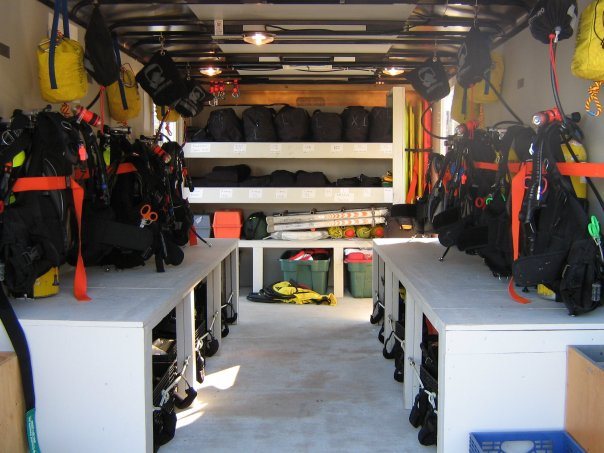

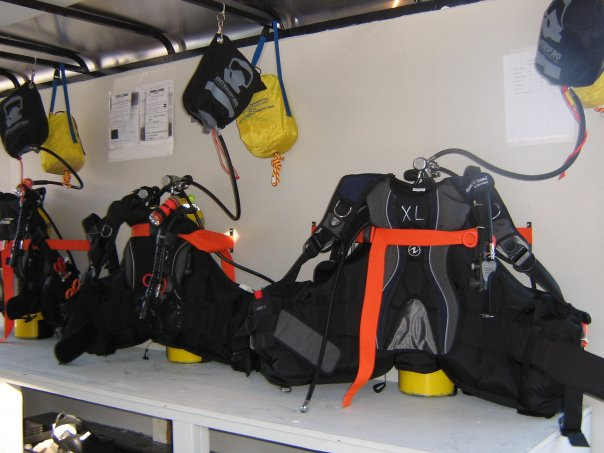

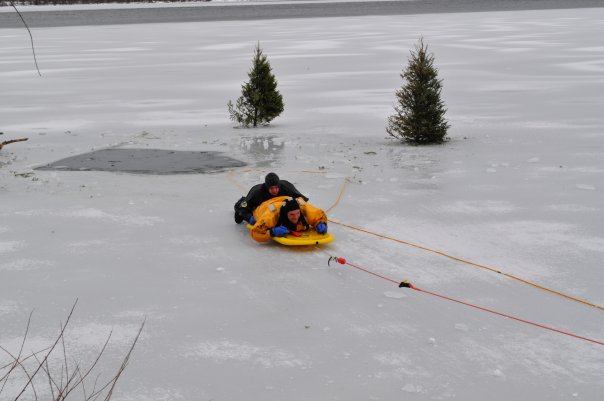

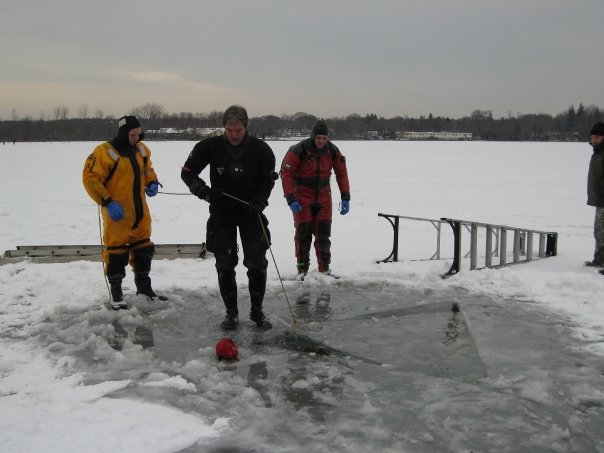

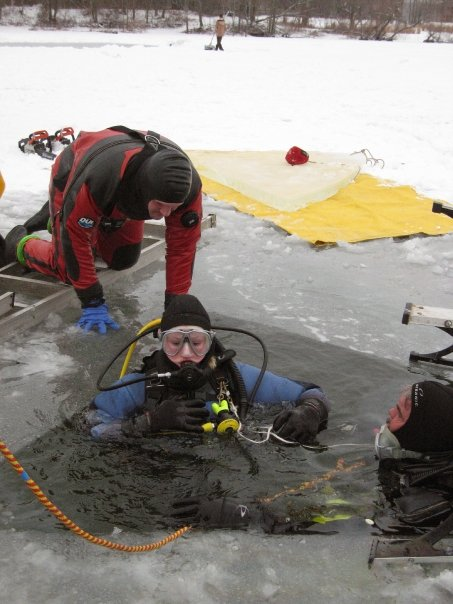

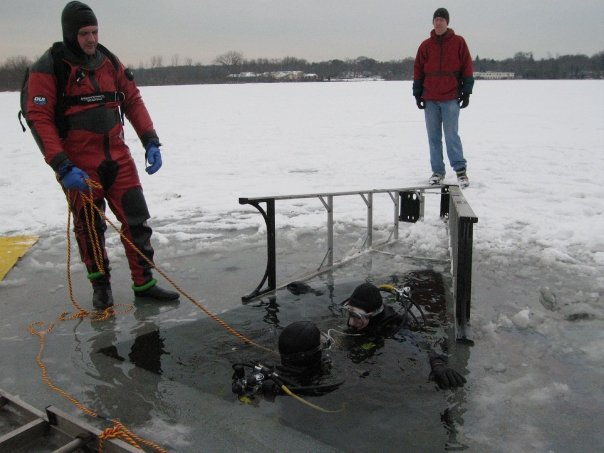

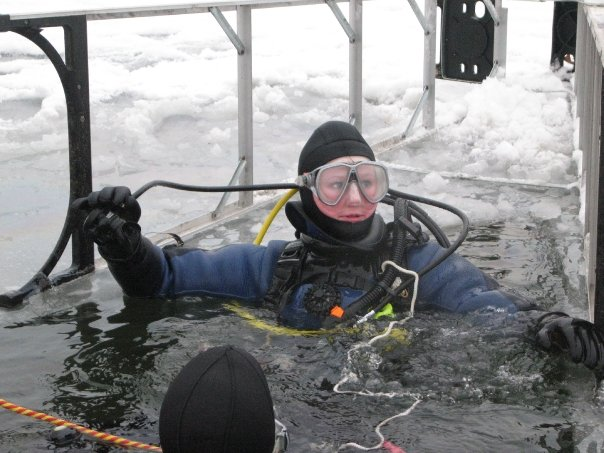

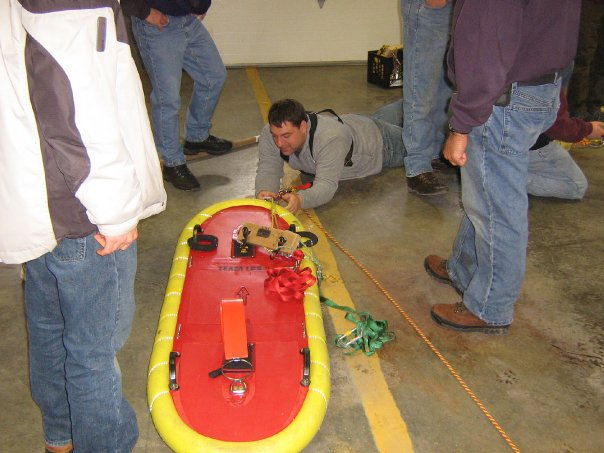

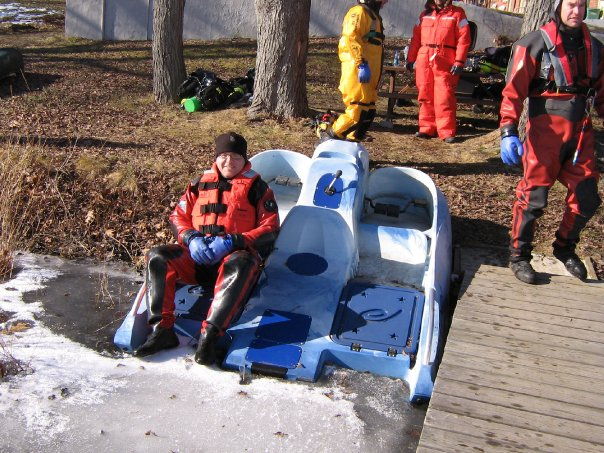

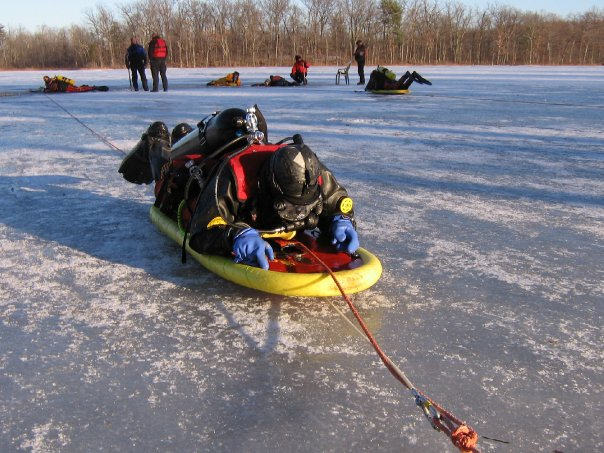

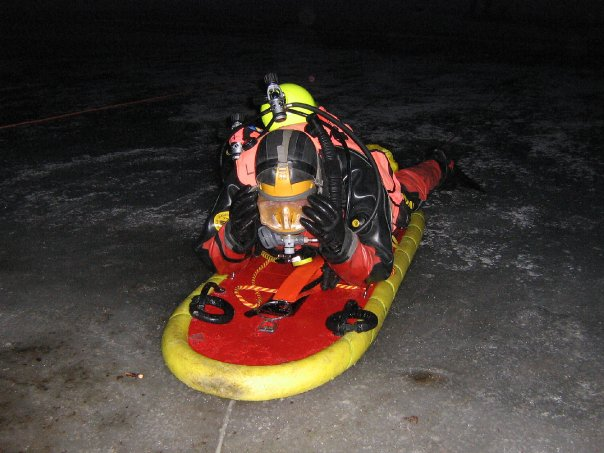

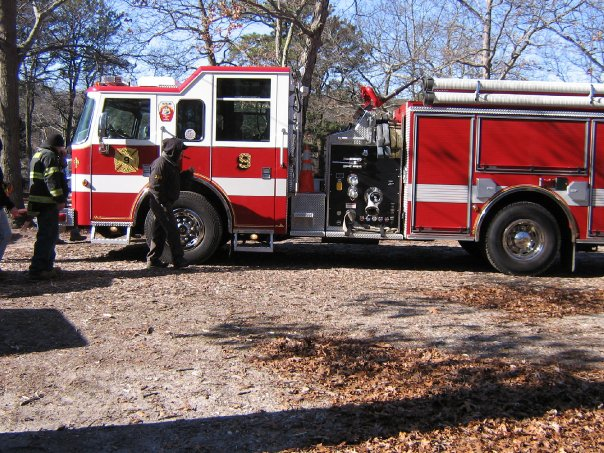

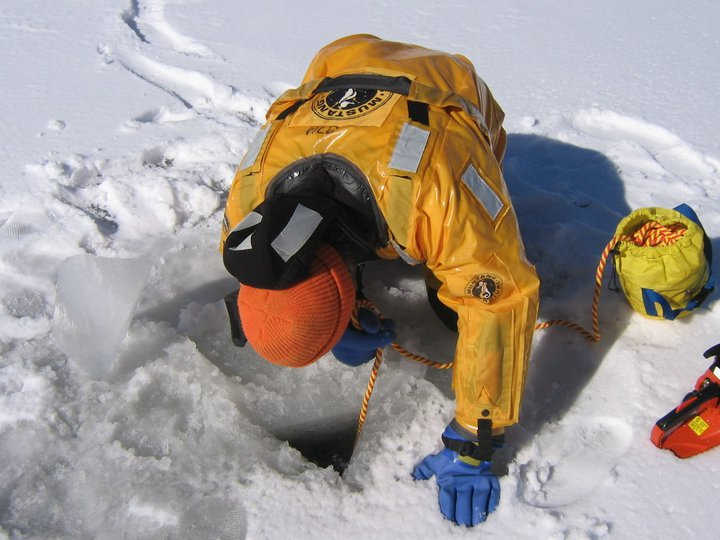

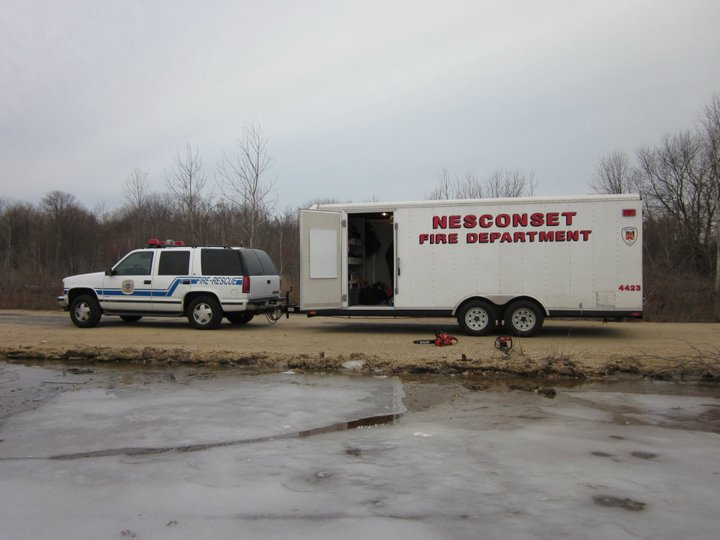

==== South Africa ====
In South Africa, public safety diving is within the scope of the Diving regulations of the Occupational Health and Safety Act, 1993.

== Environmental impact ==
In most cases public safety diving itself has little environmental impact. The diving operations generally have a specific purpose, and when that purpose is accomplished, the operation is terminated. In other cases the purpose of the diving operation may be to mitigate a specific environmental threat, like a spillage, and the methods used are chosen to minimise the overall effects of the incident. In some cases there is some adverse effect on the environment, but the goals of the diving operation may be deemed more important than the harm risked, as in the case of rescue operations. Where there is risk, it is often to the diver or diving team.

== See also ==
- Professional diving – Underwater diving where divers are paid for their work
- Underwater searches – Techniques for finding underwater targets
- Underwater search and recovery – Locating and recovering underwater objects
- Police diving – Branch of professional diving carried out by police services
- Tham Luang cave rescue – 2018 international rescue mission in Thailand, a notable instance of public safety divers being part of rescuing non-divers
