= Professional diving =

Underwater diving where divers are paid for their work

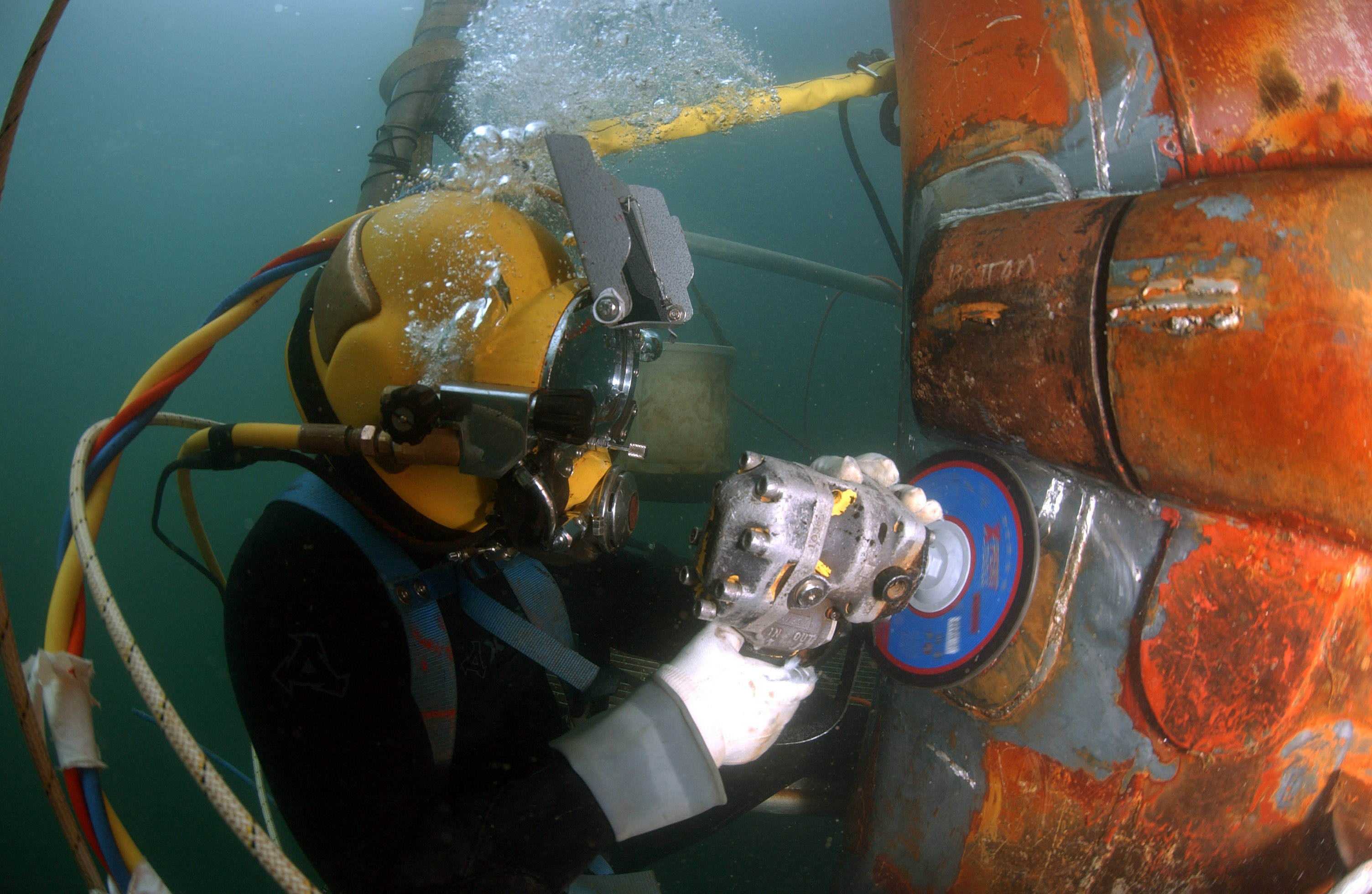
A US Navy diver at work. The umbilical supplying air from the surface is clearly visible.

Professional diving is underwater diving where the divers are paid for their work. Occupational diving has a similar meaning and applications. The procedures are often regulated by legislation and codes of practice as it is an inherently hazardous occupation and the diver works as a member of a team. Due to the dangerous nature of some professional diving operations, specialized equipment such as an on-site hyperbaric chamber and diver-to-surface communication system is often required by law, and the mode of diving for some applications may be regulated.

There are several branches of professional diving, the best known of which is probably commercial diving and its specialised applications, commercial offshore diving, inshore civil engineering diving, marine salvage diving, hazmat diving, and ships husbandry diving. There are also applications in scientific research, marine archaeology, fishing and aquaculture, public safety, law enforcement, military service, media work and diver training.

Any person wishing to become a professional diver normally requires specific training that satisfies any regulatory agencies which have regional or national authority, such as US Occupational Safety and Health Administration, United Kingdom Health and Safety Executive or South African Department of Employment and Labour. International recognition of professional diver qualifications and registration exists between some countries.

== Procedural aspects ==
The primary procedural distinction between professional and recreational diving is that the recreational diver is responsible primarily for their own actions and safety but may voluntarily accept limited responsibility for dive buddies, whereas the professional diver is part of a team of people with extensive responsibilities and obligations to each other and usually to an employer or client, and these responsibilities and obligations are formally defined in contracts, legislation, regulations, operations manuals, standing orders and compulsory or voluntary codes of practice. In many cases a statutory national occupational health and safety legislation constrains their activities. The purpose of recreational diving is basically for personal entertainment, while the professional diver has a job to do, and diving is necessary to get that job done. Recreational diving instruction and dive leadership are legally considered professional diving in some jurisdictions, particularly when the diver is employed for that purpose, and even when this is not the case, occupational health and safety regulation may apply, even when self employed, regarding duty of care to clients.

=== Diving operations ===
A diving operation is a professional dive and the activity in preparation for, and in support of, the specific dive. The diving operation is controlled by the diving supervisor, is expected to follow the dive plan, is conducted by the diving team, and is recorded in the diving operations record (though the terms may have regional variations). A diving operation is over when the last diver has completed decompression and is out of the water.

=== Diving projects ===
A diving project is a coordinated set of diving operations for a particular purpose, often the responsibility of a diving contractor. This would include mobilisation and setup of the diving spread at the start, and demobilisation at the end of the project. Depending on the size of the project, the project manager may be the senior supervisor, or the diving superintendent.

=== Diving contractor ===
A diving contractor is the legal entity responsible for the execution of diving operations for a client. The diving contractor is responsible for ensuring that the diving operations are safe, that a competent diving team is appointed, and the contracted work is done to specifications.

=== Diving team ===
A diving team is a group of people who conduct a diving operation. A characteristic of professional diving is the specification for minimum personnel for the diving support team. This typically specifies the minimum number of team members and their appointed responsibilities in the team based on the circumstances and mode of diving, and the minimum qualifications for specified members of the diving team. The minimum team requirements may be specified by regulation or code of practice. Specific appointments within a dive team for which competences are specified and registration may be required are listed below.

Core diving team:

- Diving supervisor – Professional diving team leader responsible for safety
- Working diver – The person who is intended to do the underwater work during a professional dive
- Stand-by diver – A member of a dive team who is ready to assist or rescue the working diver
- Diver's tender – Assistant to a diver
- Diving medical practitioner – Specialist in diagnosis, treatment and prevention of disorders caused by underwater diving – On telephonic standby.

Additional member for surface-supplied air diving using a low pressure compressor:

- Compressor operator – Person competent to operate a diving air compressor

Additional member for bell diving:

- Bellman – The member of a dive team who acts as stand-by diver and tender from the diving bell
- Launch and recovery system winch operator

Additional member for dives with a chamber on site:

- Chamber operator – A person who operates a diving chamber

Additional member for surface-supplied mixed gas diving:

- Gas man – Person who controls the breathing gas supply to a surface-supplied mixed-gas diver

Additional members for offshore diving:

- Diving medical technician – Person trained in advanced first aid for divers
- Systems technician – Person competent to maintain diving systems
- Diving superintendent – A management position responsible for diving operations

Additional personnel for saturation diving:

- Life support technician – A member of a saturation diving team who operates the surface habitat - One per shift.
- Life support supervisor – Senior life support technician

Additional members for remotely operated underwater vehicle support:

- ROV pilot – A person competent to operate a remotely controlled underwater vehicle
- ROV Supervisor – A senior ROV pilot appointed to supervise the ROV team

=== Regulation of activities ===
Professional diving activities are generally regulated by health and safety legislation, but in some cases may be exempted from the national or state diving regulations for specific diving applications, such as scientific diving or public safety diving, when they operate under a recognised code of practice for that application. Commercial offshore diving takes place outside the limits of national jurisdiction and is generally regulated by industry consensus standards of voluntary membership organisations such as the International Marine Contractors Association (IMCA).

=== Codes of practice ===
A code of practice for professional diving is a document that complements occupational health and safety laws and regulations to provide detailed practical guidance on how to comply with legal obligations, and should be followed unless another solution with the same or better health and safety standard is in place, or may be a document for the same purpose published by a self-regulating body to be followed by member organisations.

Codes of practice published by governments do not replace the occupational health and safety laws and regulations, and are generally issued in terms of those laws and regulations. They are intended to help understand how to comply with the requirements of regulations. A workplace inspector can refer to a code of practice when issuing an improvement or prohibition notice, and they may be admissible in court proceedings. A court may use a code of practice to establish what is reasonably practicable action to manage a specific risk. Equivalent or better ways of achieving the required work health and safety may be possible, so compliance with codes of practice is not usually mandatory, providing that any alternative systems used provide a standard of health and safety equal to or better than those recommended by the code of practice.

=== Operations manual ===
The operations manual is the diving contractor's in-house documentation specifying the procedures authorised for diving operations conducted by the company. It will refer to relevant legislation and codes of practice and will specify the organisation of the company and the chain of responsibility. Standard operating procedures for the activities normally conducted by the company may be described in sufficient detail that all affected parties can understand how the organisation operates, or may refer to other documents such as the equipment manufacturer's maintenance instructions for details.

=== Records ===
Professional diving operations are generally required to be documented for legal reasons related to contractual obligations and health and safety. Divers are required to keep their personal diving logbooks up to date, supervisors are required to record the specifics of a diving operation on the diving operations record. The dive plan is generally documented, and includes a description of the planned work, specification of the equipment to be used, the expected dive profile, and the outcome of the relevant risk assessment.

== Branches of professional diving ==
=== Commercial diving ===
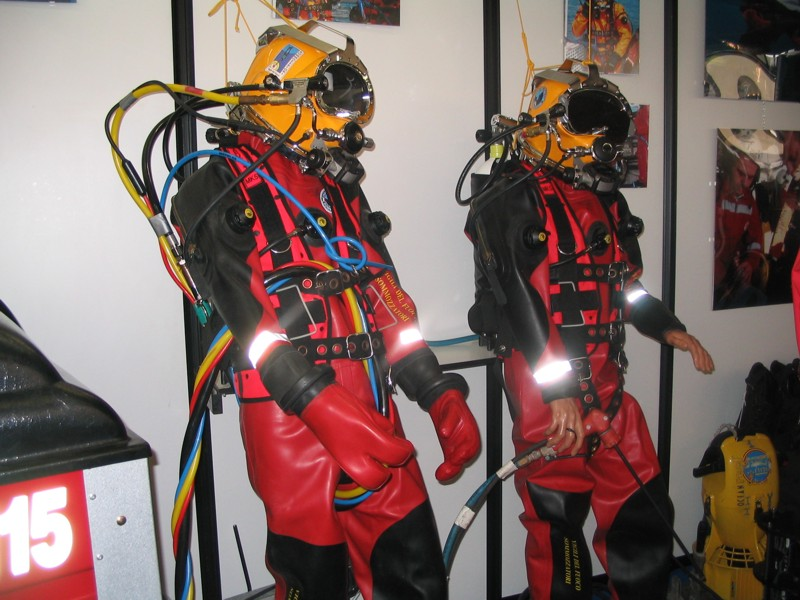
Surface supplied commercial diving equipment on display at a trade show

Commercial diving may be considered an application of professional diving where the diver engages in underwater work for industrial, construction, engineering, maintenance or other commercial purposes which are similar to work done out of the water, and where the diving is usually secondary to the work. In some legislation, commercial diving is defined as any diving done by an employee as part of their job, and for legal purposes this may include scientific, public safety, media, and military diving. That is similar to the definition for professional diving and occupational diving, but in those cases the difference is in the status of the diver within the organisation of the diving contractor. This distinction may not exist in other jurisdictions. In South Africa, any person who dives under the control and instructions of another person within the scope of the Occupational Health and Safety Act, 1993, is within the scope of the Diving Regulations, 2009. In the UK, the Diving at Work Regulations, 1997, apply.

Major applications of commercial diving include:

- Offshore diving – Diving outside the territorial waters of a country
- Civil engineering diving – Diving in support of civil engineering projects.
  - Underwater construction – Industrial construction in an underwater environment
  - Inspection, nondestructive testing, and repair
- Hazmat diving – Underwater diving in a known hazardous materials environment
  - Nuclear diving – Diving in an environment where there is a risk of exposure to radioactive materials
  - Sewer diving – Diving for maintenance work in sewers
- Potable water diving – Underwater diving in potable water systems
- Salvage diving – Diving work associated with the recovery of vehicles, cargo and structures
- Ships husbandry diving – Diving related to the maintenance and upkeep of ships

=== Scientific diving ===
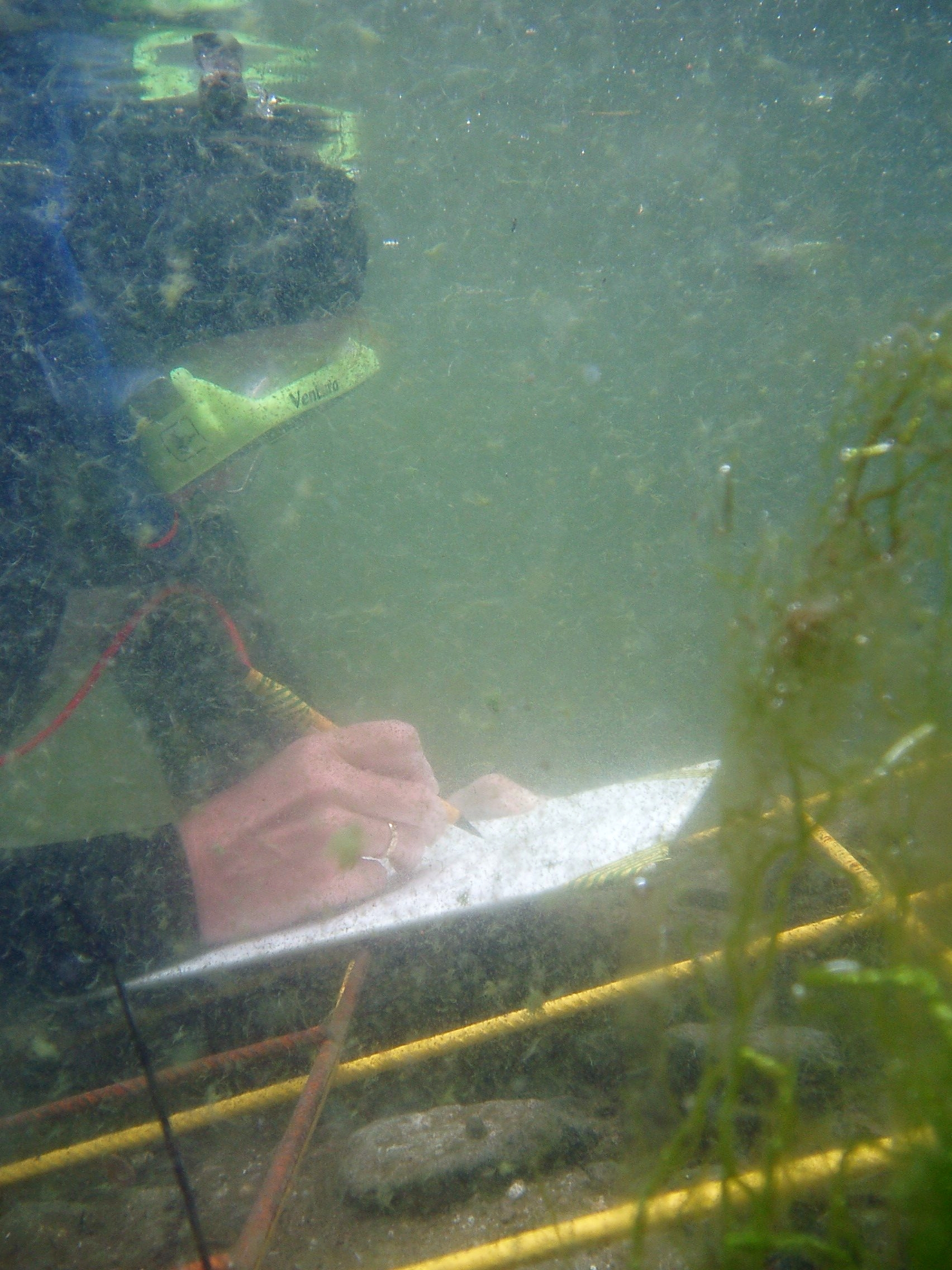
A scientific diver at work

Scientific diving is the use of diving techniques by scientists to study underwater what would normally be studied by scientists. Scientific divers are normally qualified scientists first and divers second, who use diving equipment and techniques as their way to get to the location of their fieldwork. The direct observation and manipulation of marine habitats afforded to scuba-equipped scientists have transformed the marine sciences generally, and marine biology and marine chemistry in particular. Underwater archeology and geology are other examples of sciences pursued underwater. Some scientific diving is carried out by universities in support of undergraduate or postgraduate research programs.

Government bodies such as the United States Environmental Protection Agency and the UK Environment Agency carry out scientific diving to recover samples of water, marine organisms and sea, lake or riverbed material to examine for signs of pollution.

Equipment used varies widely in this field, but surface supplied equipment though quite uncommon in the UK is growing in popularity in the U.S. Most scientific dives are relatively short duration and shallow, and surface supplied equipment is cumbersome and relatively expensive. The safety record of scuba for scientific diving has been good, and it is considered acceptable for most scientific diving by several national and international codes of practice.

Not all scientific divers are professionals; some are amateurs who assist with research or contribute observations on citizen science projects out of personal interest.

Scientific diving organizations include:

- The American Academy of Underwater Sciences
- The European Scientific Diving Panel.
- The German Academy of Underwater Sciences.

Standard references for scientific diving operations include:

- Code of Practice for Scientific Diving: Principles for the Safe Practice of Scientific Diving in Different Environments.
- Joiner James T. (ed), NOAA Diving Manual: Diving for Science and Technology, Fourth Edition, 2001, U.S.Department of Commerce, National Technical Information Service, (ISBN 0941332705)
- Haddock, Steven H. D. & John N. Heine, 2005. Scientific Blue-water Diving California Sea Grant College Program

=== Media diving ===
Media diving is the practice of underwater photography and underwater cinematography outside of normal recreational interests. Media diving is often carried out in support of television documentaries or movies using underwater footage. Media divers are usually skilled camera operators who use diving as a method to access their workplace, although some professional underwater photographers start as recreational divers.

Scuba and surface supplied equipment is used, depending on job requirements and risk, and rebreathers are often used for wildlife related work as they are relatively quiet, release a smaller volume of bubbles and allow the diver a long dive time with a reduced risk of disturbing the subject.

=== Military and naval diving ===
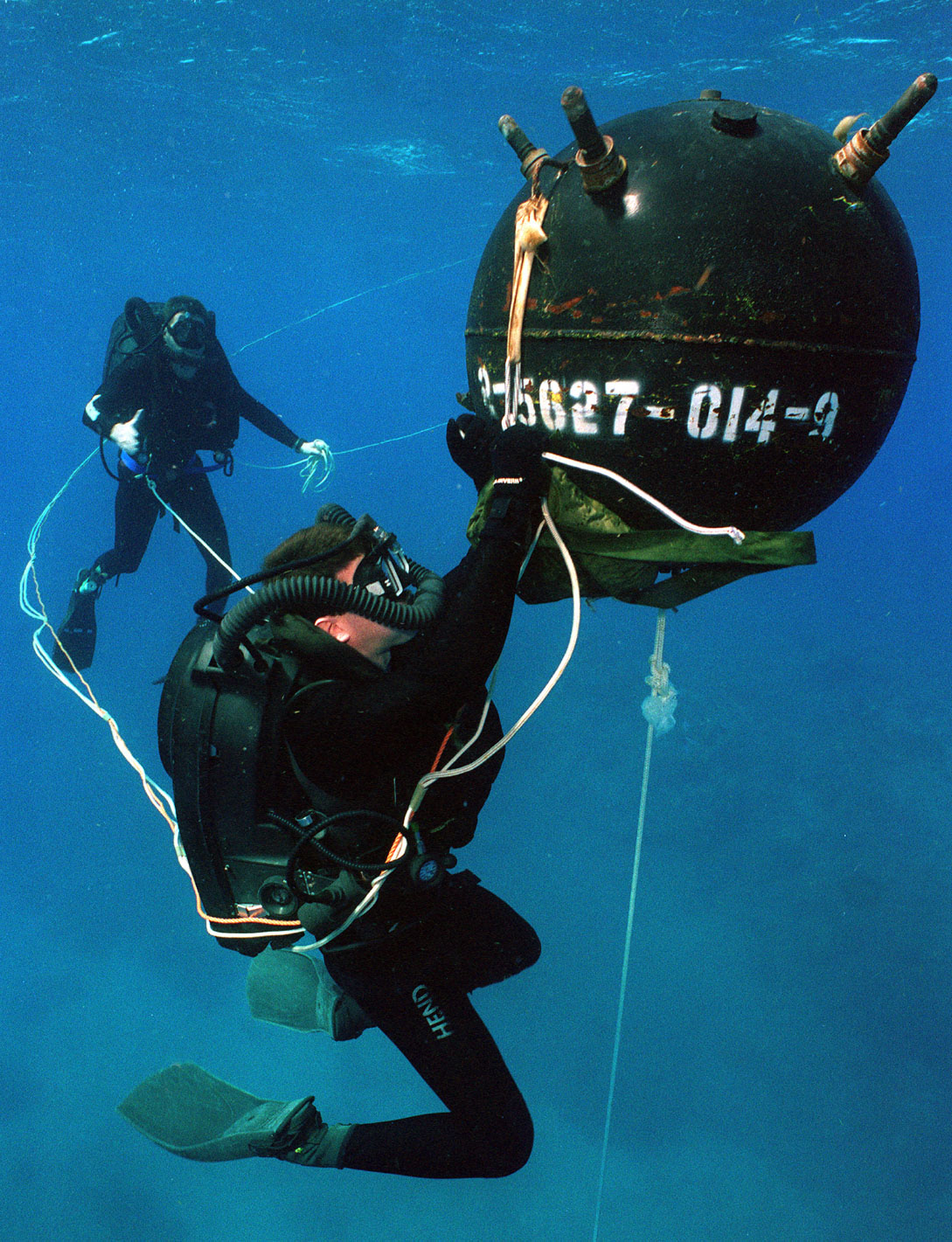
US Navy Clearance Divers defusing a MK17 Buoyant Mine

Military diving is diving carried out by military personnel in the course of their duties. There are a number of different specialisations in military diving; some depend on the branch of the military. Offensive activities include underwater demolition, infiltration and sabotage, this being the type of work done by units such as the UK Special Boat Service or the United States Navy SEALs. Defensive activities are centered around countering the threat of enemy special forces and enemy anti-shipping measures, and typically involve defusing mines, searching for explosive devices attached to the hulls of ships, and locating enemy frogmen in the water.

Military divers may need equipment which does not reveal their position and avoids setting off explosives, and to this end, they may use rebreathers which produce less noise due to bubbles emitted from the equipment, and few or no bubbles on the surface, and which contain no magnetic components, and the face-mask may be fitted with anti-reflective glass.

Naval diving is the military term for what civilians would call commercial diving. Naval divers work to support maintenance and repair operations on ships and military installations. Their equipment is derived from commercially available equipment, with the US Navy using versions of the Kirby Morgan helmets and full-face masks amongst other equipment. Typical tasks include:

- inspection, cleaning and maintenance of boats, ships, and underwater structures
- demolition of shipwrecks, obstructing navigation and unexploded ordnance
- ship, submarine, downed aircraft, and other military hardware salvage or recovery
- underwater mine clearance
- investigating unidentified submerged divers

Some armies have their own diving personnel for inland water operations.

Experimental diving may be conducted by special units like the US Navy's Experimental Diving Unit (NEDU) which involves meeting military needs through the research and development of diving practices and diving equipment, testing new types of equipment and finding more effective and safer ways to perform dives and related activities. The US NEDU was responsible for much of the experimental diving work to calculate and validate decompression tables and algorithms, and has since worked on such developments as heated diving suits powered by radioactive isotopes and mixed gas diving equipment, while the British equivalent (The Admiralty Experimental Diving Unit) developed the Mark 10 submarine escape suits used by both the Royal Navy and the US Navy.

=== Police diving ===
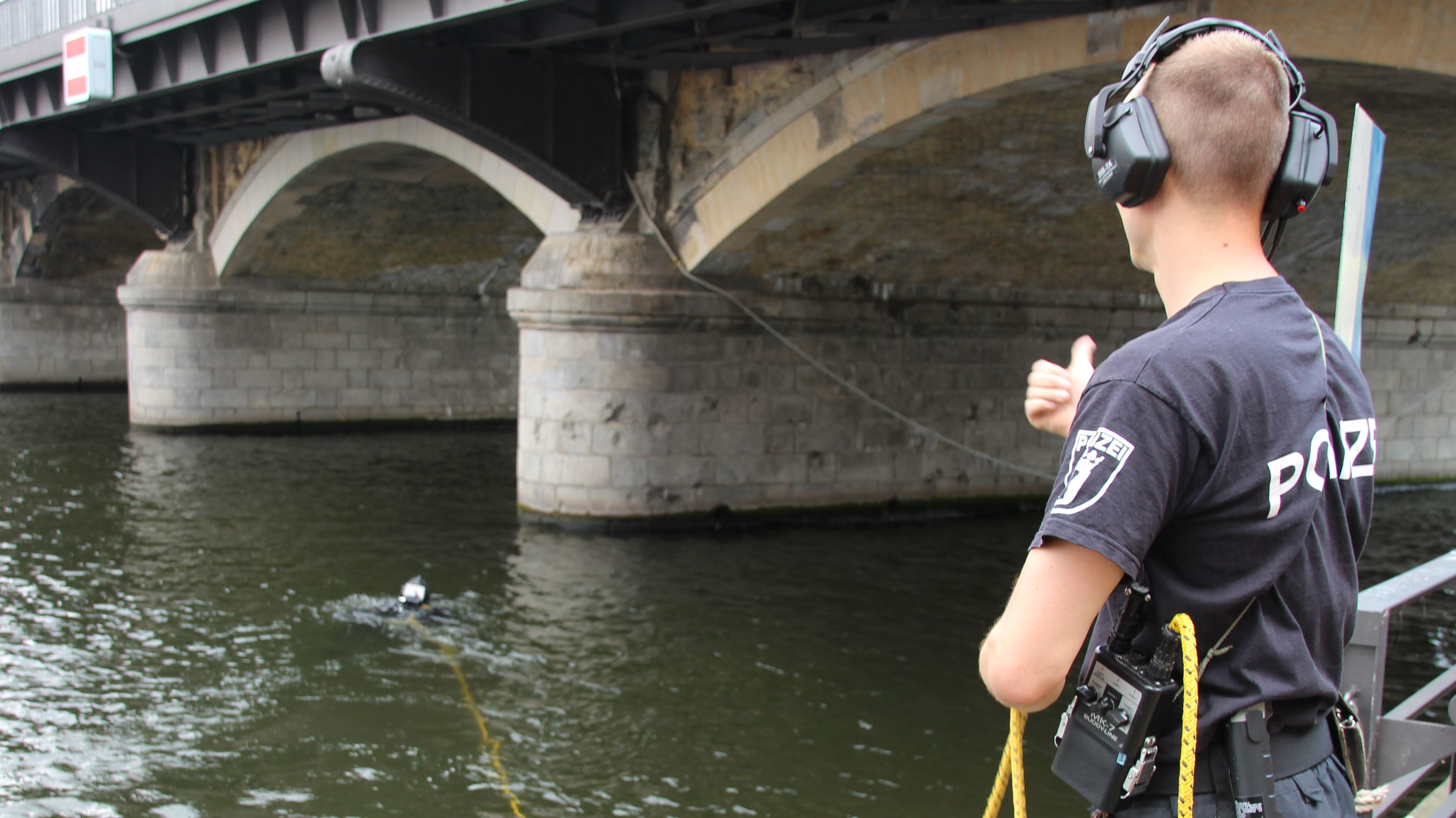
Police diving team in a river in Berlin

Police divers are normally police officers who have been trained in the use of diving techniques to recover evidence and occasionally bodies from underwater. They may also be employed in searching shipping for contraband attached to the outside of hulls to avoid detection by internal searches. The equipment they use depends on operational requirements, but a requirement for communications with the surface team would necessitate the use of full-face masks with voice communication equipment, either with scuba or surface-supplied equipment.

=== Public safety diving ===
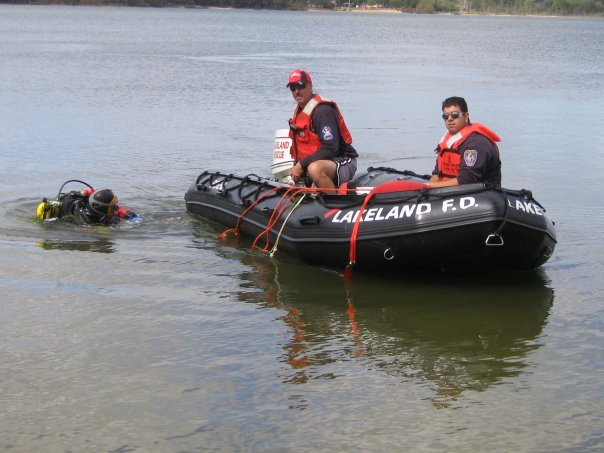
Nesconset fire department scuba rescue team on training exercise

Public safety diving is the underwater work conducted by law enforcement, fire rescue, and search and rescue or recovery dive teams. Public safety divers differ from recreational, scientific and commercial divers who can generally plan the date, time, and location of a dive, and dive only if the conditions are conducive to the task. Public safety divers respond to emergencies at whatever time and place they occur, and may be required to dive at times and in circumstances where conditions and regulations may exempt them from some of the health and safety requirements of other professional divers at times when it appears possible that a living person may be rescued. In the US, many public safety divers are volunteers, but career law enforcement or fire rescue personnel also often take on these additional responsibilities as part of their occupation.

=== Aquarium diving ===
People employed as aquarium divers normally hold some form of occupational diving qualification, either as a commercial diver or a recognised recreational certification indicating sufficient competence. The work is varied but is centred around the maintenance of the tank, care of the livestock and public entertainment. This includes tank cleaning and maintenance, including cleaning the windows, putting on shows and generally interacting with the public, feeding the animals, and guiding members of the public on recreational dives in the tanks.

A large amount of aquarium diving work may be done by volunteers. In some places volunteers may only need recreational certification, but in others they may need professional diver registration, although to some extent this is at the discretion of the aquarium management, as it may balance on whether the diver is under the official direction of the management, which in some jurisdictions will automatically oblige them to be considered occupational divers in terms of occupational health and safety regulations.

Regulatory requirements will vary. The Georgia Aquarium diving operations are regulated by OSHA 29 CFR Part 1910 Subpart T regulations for commercial diving operations, standards set by the Association of Zoos and Aquariums (AZA), the American Academy of Underwater Sciences (AAUS), and the World Recreational Scuba Training Council (WRSTC) for diving procedures and equipment, and also the Marine Mammal Protection Act, regulations set by the U.S. Department of Agriculture (USDA), the Georgia Department of Natural Resources, and others, for care of the animals. In South Africa, the Diving Regulations of the Occupational Health and Safety Act apply, and in the UK, the Diving at Work Regulations.

=== Aquaculture diving ===
Aquaculture is the controlled cultivation of aquatic organisms such as fish, crustaceans, mollusks, algae and other organisms of value such as aquatic plants. It involves cultivating freshwater, brackish water, and saltwater populations under controlled or semi-natural conditions. Aquaculture is also a practice used for restoring and rehabilitating marine and freshwater ecosystems. Many of the tasks of aquaculture need to be done underwater, and can be done by divers employed for this purpose.

Aquaculture divers perform tasks like inspecting and repairing nets and cages, monitoring the health of the farmed organisms, and preventing stock lost due to damaged equipment. Typical diver activities include inspection, cleaning, and repair of nets, monitoring the health of the stock, maintenance of moorings, mortality cleanup, and retrieval of equipment. The work is done at relatively shallow depths, and environmental hazards are usually low risk.

=== Diving instructors ===
Instructors for the professional classes of diving are generally qualified and experienced as divers, diving supervisors, and adult educators operating under the auspices of a governmental agency. Standards for instruction are authorized by those agencies to ensure safety during training and competence in the workplace. Commercial diving instructors are normally required to have commercial diving qualifications. They typically teach trainee commercial divers how to operate the types of diving equipment and typical underwater tools they will use in the course of their work as well as the skills required for diving safely with the relevant equipment.

Recreational diving instructors differ from other types of professional divers as they normally don't require registration as commercial divers, but a relevant recreational qualification from a recognised certification agency and in-date membership or registration with that agency which permits them to teach and assess the competence of recreational divers to agency standards. Recreational dive instructors teach a wide variety of skills from entry-level diver training for beginners, to diver rescue for intermediate level divers and technical diving for divers who wish to dive in higher risk environments. They may operate from dedicated dive centres at coastal sites, or through hotels in popular holiday resorts or simply from local swimming pools. Initial training is carried out mainly on conventional open circuit scuba equipment but with the increasing availability of recreational rebreathers, their use is also taught. Not all recreational diving instructors are professionals; many are amateurs with careers outside the diving industry, but they work to the same training standards as the professionals, and will have the same duty of care for their trainees.

=== Recreational dive leaders ===
Professional underwater dive leaders (also referred to as divemasters) are quite commonly employed by dive centres, live-aboard dive boats and day charter boats to lead certified recreational divers and groups of divers on underwater excursions. These divemasters are generally expected to ensure that the customers are briefed on the conditions to be expected, the known hazards other than those inherent in the activity, and what the customer can reasonably expect to see during a dive. They are underwater tour guides, and as such are expected to know the level of certification and fitness needed for the planned dive, but are not generally considered responsible for ensuring that the customers are competent to the level of certification they hold, or for the personal safety of the customers during the dive. If the dive leader allocates dive buddies, they may thereby make themselves legally responsible for ensuring that the buddy pairs they allocate are appropriate. Any instruction given by the dive leader may make them liable for the reasonably foreseeable consequences of carrying out that instruction, though the customer is usually obliged to sign a waiver exonerating the dive guide for ordinary negligence. Not all recreational dive leaders are professionals; many are amateurs with careers outside the diving industry, and lead groups of friends or club members without financial reward. The internationally recognised minimum standard for a person professionally leading a group of certified recreational divers is ISO 24801-3 and the equivalent European Standard EN 14153–3. Most recreational diver training agencies have a certification meeting these standards.

== Equipment ==
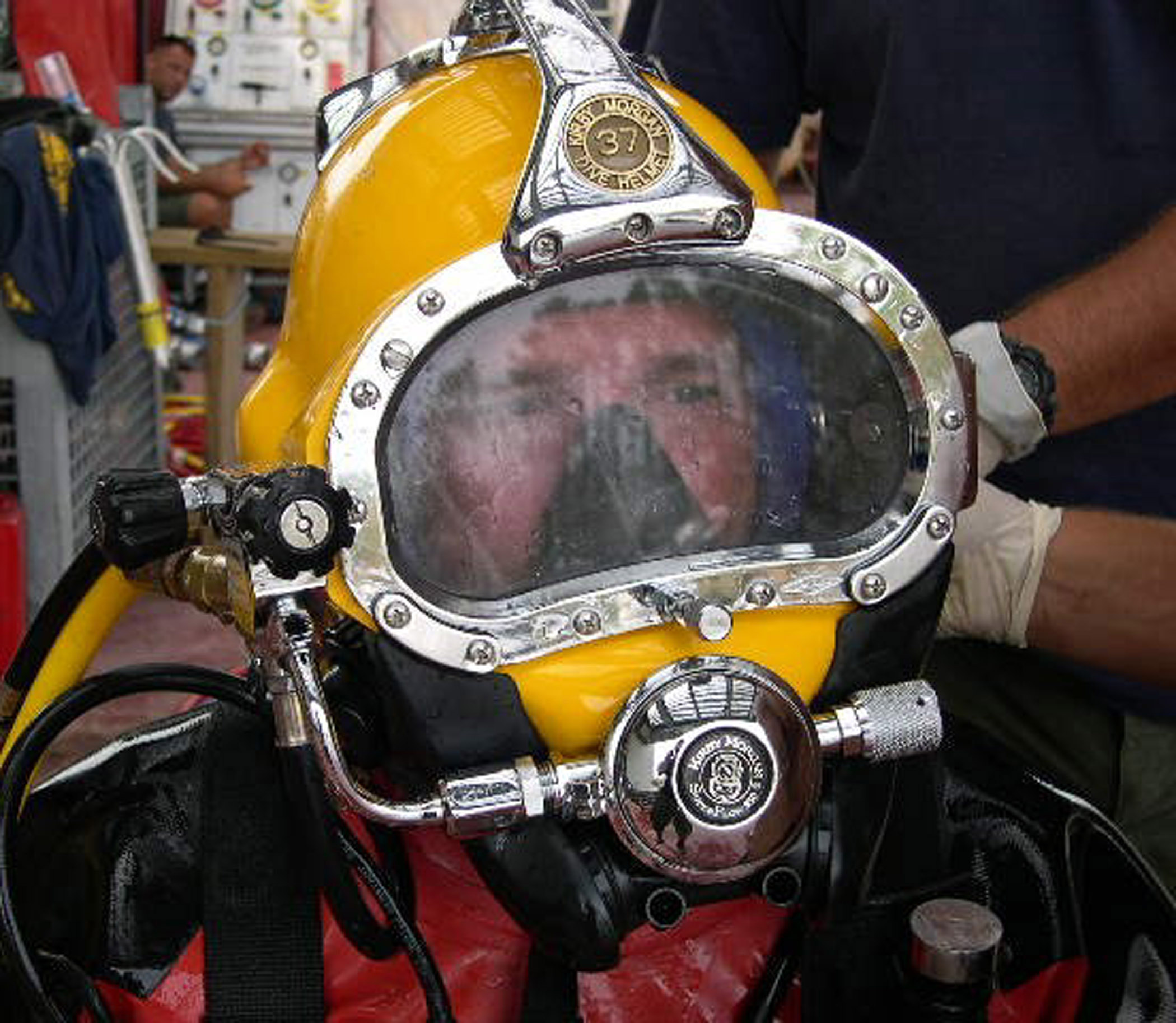
US Navy Diver using Kirby Morgan diving helmet

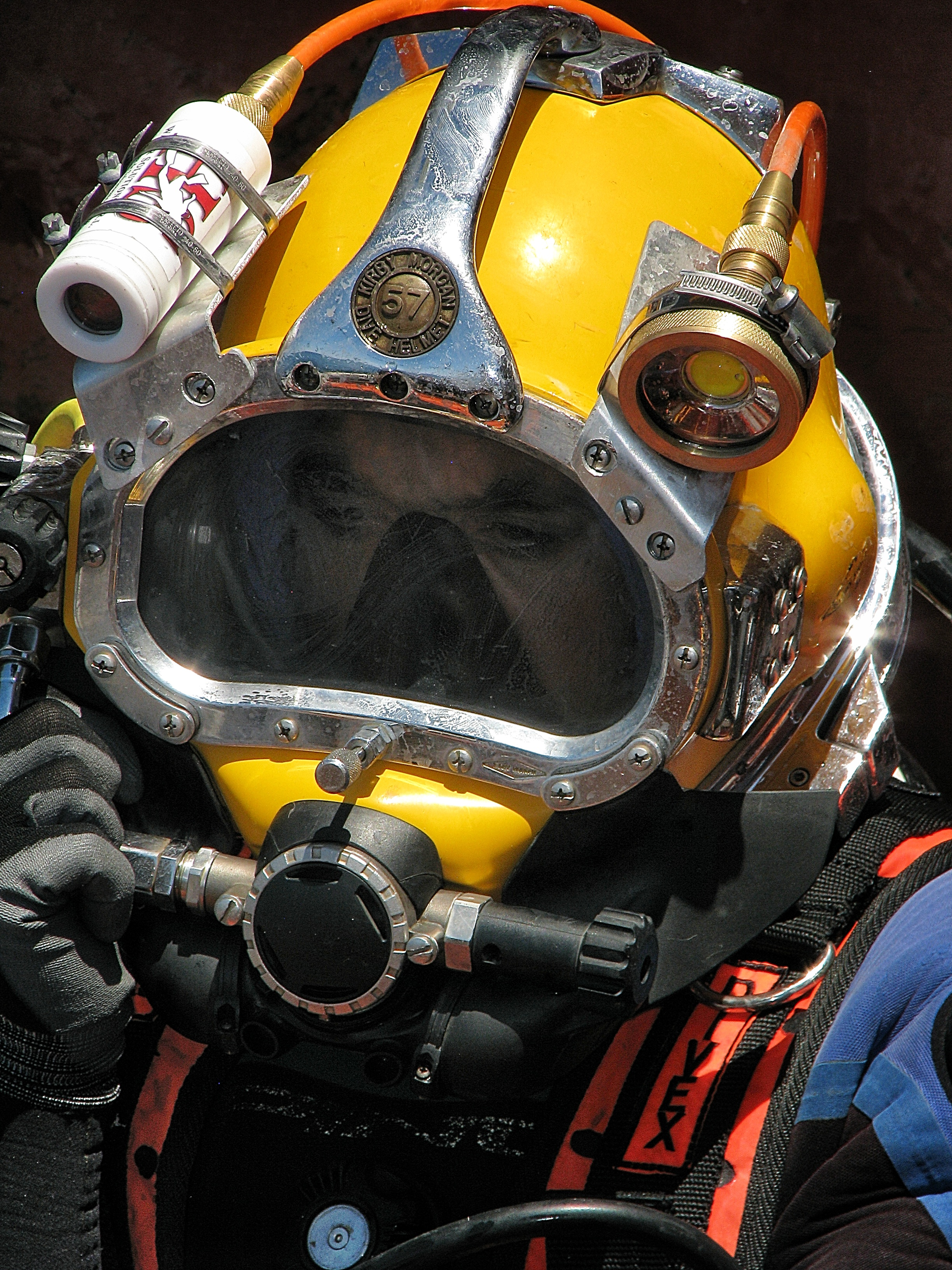
Argentine Diver using Kirby Morgan 57 diving helmet fitted with underwater camera and light

Diving equipment is equipment used by underwater divers to make diving activities possible, easier, safer and/or more comfortable. This may be equipment primarily intended for this purpose, or equipment intended for other purposes which is found to be suitable for diving use.

=== Diving suit ===
Depending on the water temperature, depth and duration of the planned dive, the diver will either use a wetsuit, dry suit or hot water suit. A wetsuit provides thermal insulation by layers of foam neoprene but the diver gets wet. Hot water diving suits are similar to a wetsuit but are flooded with warm water from a surface water heater that is then pumped to the diver via an umbilical. A dry suit is another method of insulation, operating by keeping the diver dry under the suit, and relies on either the suit material, the gas trapped in thermal undergarments, or both, to insulate the diver, and also provides better isolation from environmental contamination. Certain applications require a specific type of dive suit; long dives into deep, cold water normally require a hot water suit or dry suit, whilst diving into potentially contaminated environments requires a dry suit, dry hood, and dry gloves at a minimum, usually with a helmet sealed to the suit, or at least a positive pressure full-face mask, thereby keeping the diver completely isolated from the diving environment.

=== Breathing apparatus ===
A number of factors dictate the type of breathing apparatus used by the diver. Typical considerations include the length of the dive, water contamination, space constraints and vehicle access for support vehicles. Some disciplines will very rarely use surface supplied diving, such as scientific divers or military clearance divers, whilst commercial divers will rarely use scuba equipment.

==== Scuba diving ====
Scuba equipment is not commonly used in civilian commercial diving, but is often employed by scientific, media and military divers, sometimes as specialized equipment such as rebreathers, which are closed circuit scuba equipment that recycles exhaled breathing gas instead of releasing it into the water. The recycling of gas makes rebreathers advantageous for long duration dives, more efficient decompression is possible when the gas mix is adjustable, and observation of animals in the wild is facilitated due to the lack of noisy exhaust bubbles. These characteristics also make rebreathers suitable for military tactical use, such as when military divers are engaged in covert action where bubbles would alert the opposition to their presence, or when performing mine clearance where bubble noise could potentially trigger an explosion.

Open circuit scuba equipment is occasionally used by commercial divers working on sites where surface supplied equipment is impracticable, such as around raised structures like a water tower, or in remote locations where it is necessary to carry equipment to the dive site. A full face mask with voice communications equipment will usually be used to allow dive lights and video cameras to be mounted on the mask. A benefit of full-face masks is that most models can also be used with surface supplied equipment, making them more versatile.

==== Surface-supplied diving ====
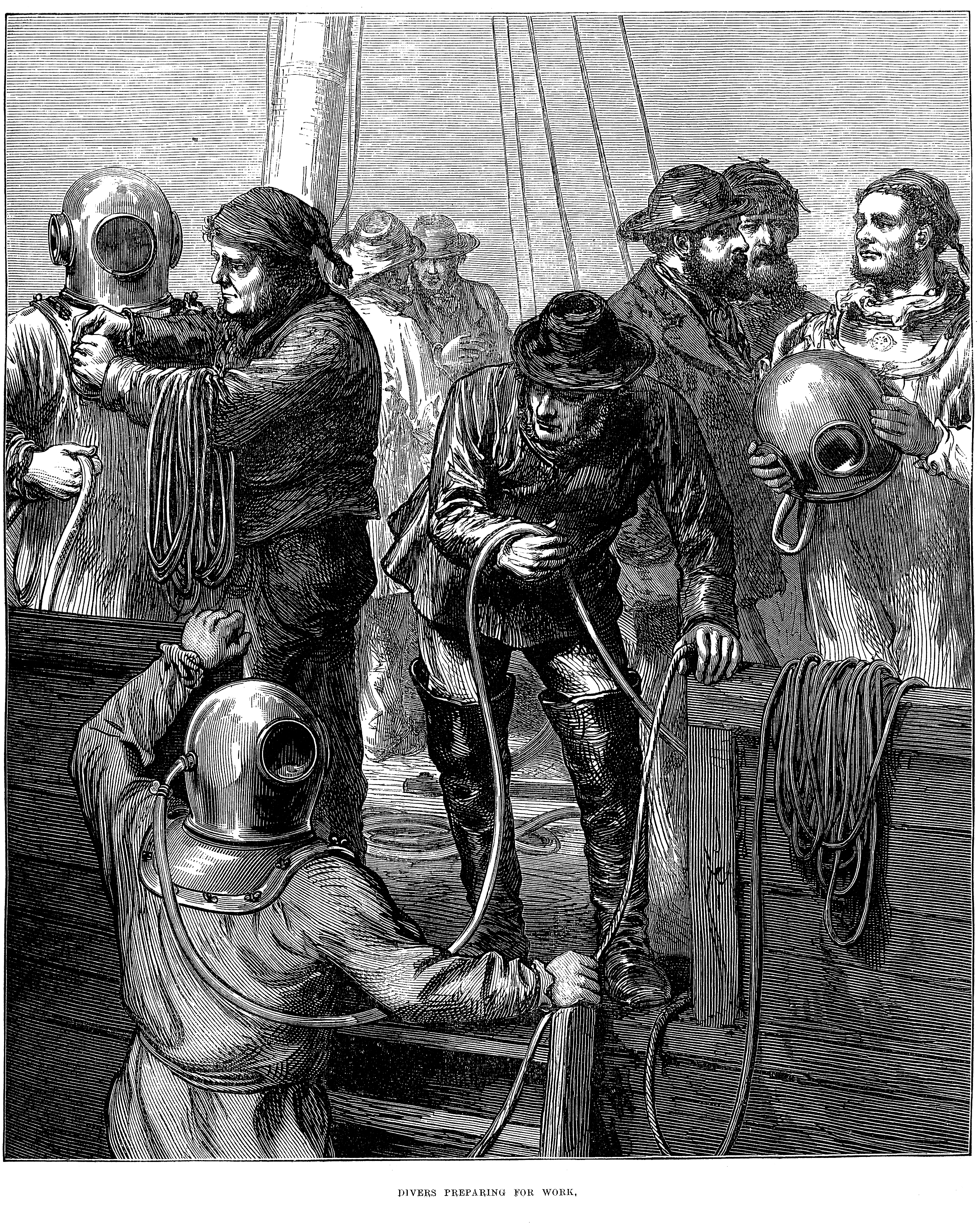
Surface-supplied divers (Illustrated London News, 8 February 1873)

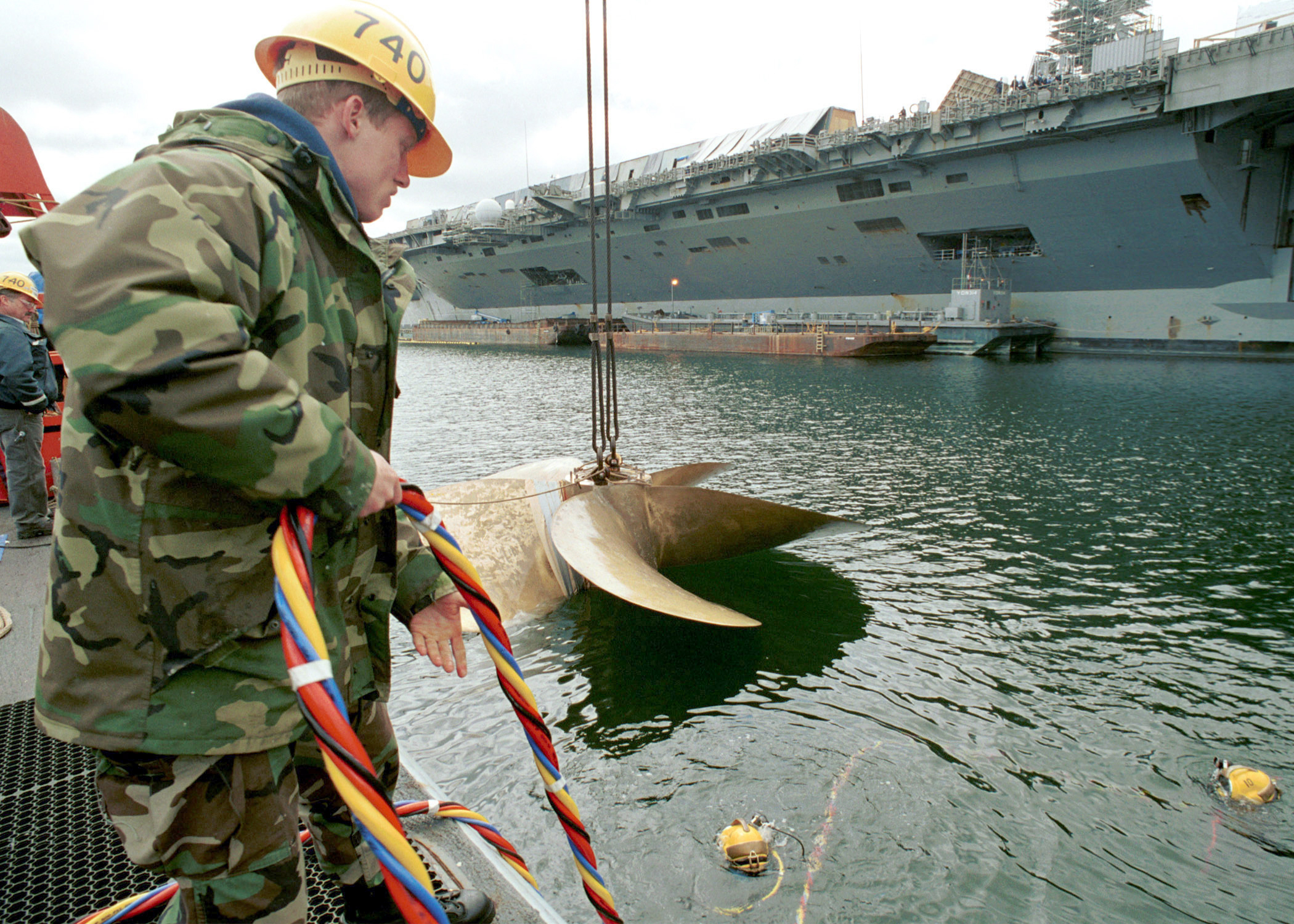
US Navy tender with umbilical - A typical surface supplied diving situation

This is the preferred diving mode for professional diving when it is reasonably practicable, as it allows reliable voice communications, and a reliable gas supply. Surface-supplied equipment can be used with full face masks or diving helmets. Helmets are normally fitted with diver to surface voice communication equipment, and often with light sources and video cameras.

Breathing gas for the diver is supplied from high-pressure gas storage cylinders or a low-pressure diving air compressor at the surface, via a gas distribution manifold, through a long, flexible hose, bundled with other services and called an diver's umbilical. In addition to breathing gas, the umbilical will have additional hoses and cables for voice communications equipment, a pneumofathometer for measuring depth, and hot water if the diver uses a hot water suit. The umbilical must be strong enough to support the diver's weight, with an adequate safety margin, because it may be used by surface personnel to hoist the diver out of the water.

==== Saturation diving ====
If the diver is to work at fairly constant depths for periods which would require long periods for decompression, the diver may live in a special underwater habitat or a pressurised surface habitat called a saturation system. This type of diving is known as saturation diving. The same technique for supplying breathing gas as regular surface supplied diving is used, with the diving bell receiving breathing gas and other essential services from a diving support vessel on the surface. If diving at extreme depths, helium-based breathing gas mixtures are used to prevent nitrogen narcosis and oxygen toxicity which would otherwise occur due to the high ambient pressure. The diver is decompressed only once, at the end of the job, which saves time and reduces risk of decompression injury.

== Health and safety ==
The hazards and risk associated with professional diving include those of the underwater environment, combined with those of the specific work environment and the tools, equipment and work of the diving task. Professional diving falls under occupational health and safety legislation, and as the hazards and risks are often specific to the occupation, it may be specifically covered by regulation promulgated for this purpose, as well as more general occupational health and safety regulations relevant to the current working environment. Many of the inherent risks of diving are mainly managed by administrative controls and personal protective equipment, some of which requires significant expertise to operate effectively, so training is necessary, and registration is required as a means of ensuring adequate training has been completed and competence has been assessed. Other risks are associated with health and fitness to dive, and there are standards set for these assessing these factors, and for keeping record of that they are up to date.

The annual fatality rate in the US and Europe tends to be between 20 and 233 per 100.000, and it is considered likely that rates may be higher in developing countries. Occupational injuries leading to lost workdays for commercial divers in the US were estimated at about 460 per annum between 2011 and 2017.

Underwater work is forbidden for minors by the International Labour Organization (ILO, Recommendation no. 190 - Worst Forms of Child Labour Recommendation, 1999) and is classified as arduous work for health care and social security in some jurisdictions.

There is no international classification of commercial divers in maritime labour law, and this may vary considerably between national legislations. In the US there are cases where commercial divers were recognised as seamen under the Jones Act.

== Training and registration ==
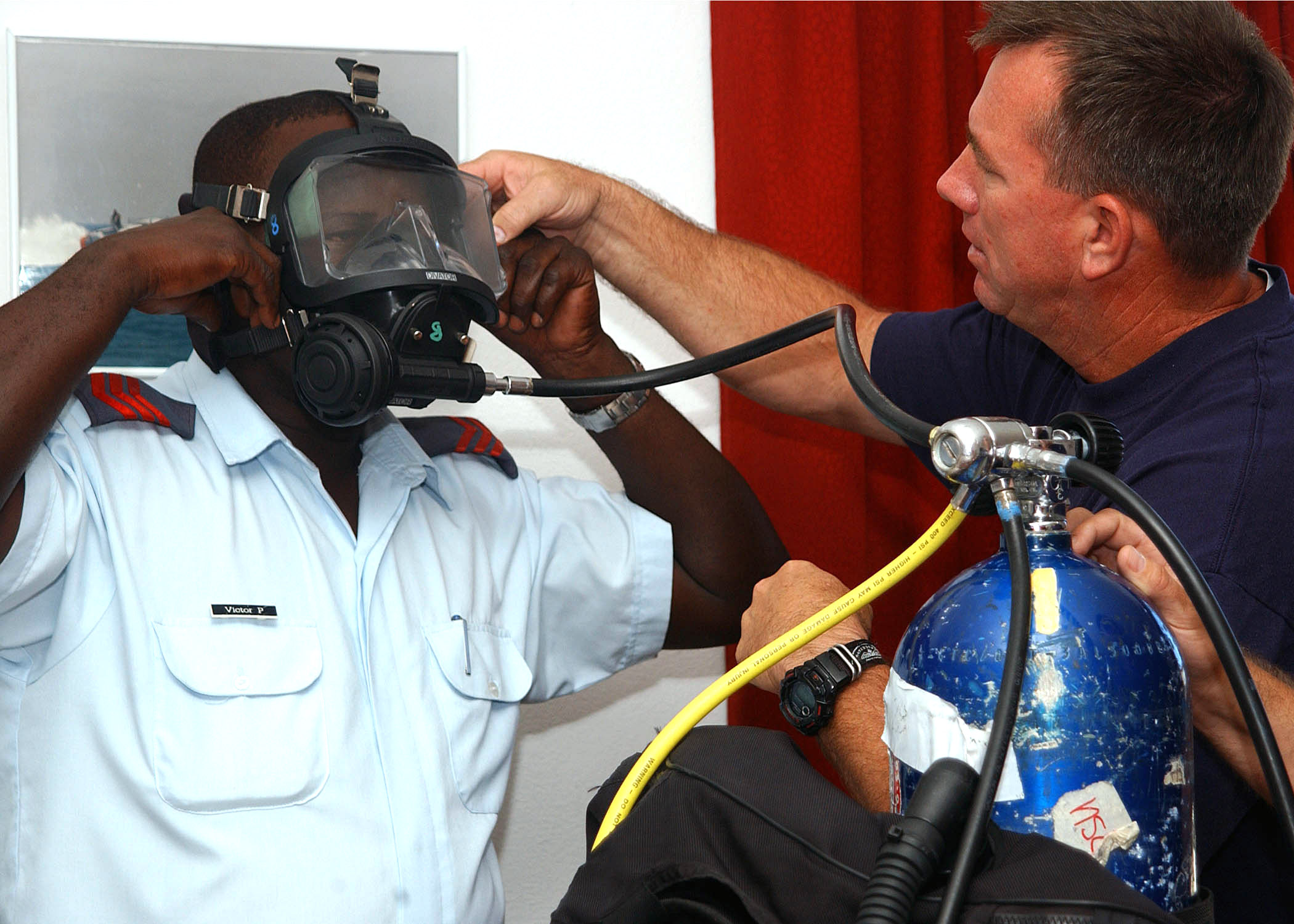
Training in the characteristics and use of breathing apparatus as relevant to the certification

Diver training is the set of processes through which a person learns the necessary and desirable skills to safely dive underwater within the scope of the diver training standard relevant to the specific training programme. Most diver training follows procedures and schedules laid down in the associated training standard, in a formal training programme, and includes relevant foundational knowledge of the underlying theory, including some basic physics, physiology and environmental information, practical skills training in the selection and safe use of the associated equipment in the specified underwater environment, and assessment of the required skills and knowledge deemed necessary by the certification agency to allow the newly certified diver to dive within the specified range of conditions at an acceptable level of risk. Recognition of prior learning is allowed in some training standards.

Professional diver certification is generally in terms of a diver training standard published by a national government organisation or department, or an international organisation of which such national bodies are members. Training standards specify the mode of diving, equipment and scope of operations for divers registered in terms of that standard. International recognition of professional diver certification may require registration through a national government agency or an agency appointed by a national government for this purpose.

Diver training is closely associated with diver certification or registration, the process of application for and issue of formal recognition of competence by a certification agency or registration authority.

Work skills specific to the underwater environment may be included in diver trailing programmes, but are also often provided independently, either as job training for a specific operation, or as generic training by specialists in the fields.

=== Regional requirements ===
==== Australia ====
The Australian Diver Accreditation Scheme (ADAS) is an international commercial and occupational diver certification scheme administered on a cost-recovery basis by the ADAS Board under the direction of the Australian Department of Resources, Energy and Tourism. It has mutual recognition arrangements with other equivalent national schemes. The original Australian and New Zealand (NZ) national occupational diver certification scheme was developed by the Australian government as a not-for-profit accreditation and certification scheme. Training is provided by Accredited Training Establishments (ATEs) which are required to operate at a level of international best practice as specified by ADAS. The scheme provides certification of divers and accreditation of training establishments, develops training courses to meet industry needs, and promotes the mobility of ADAS licence holders around the world. Australian commercial divers are trained in accordance with Australian Standard AS 2815.

==== Canada ====
The Diver Certification Board of Canada certifies occupational divers, and accredits schools which train occupational divers. The DCBC is a federally incorporated not-for-profit body which was originally set up to replace the offshore diver certification regime of the National Energy Board and the offshore petroleum boards. DCBC is the only national body which certifies offshore and inshore commercial divers in Canada.

The DCBC offers certification to commercial divers and supervisors who can demonstrate that they have sufficient training and experience to enable them to meet the competency requirements of the appropriate section of the Canadian Standards Association (CSA) Competency Standard for Diving Operations (CSA Standard Z275.4). Certificates issued by the DCBC are recognized by Australia (ADAS), France, Norway, South Africa (DoEL), the United Kingdom (HSE) and the International Marine Contractors Association (IMCA). The Diver Certification Board of Canada accredits commercial diver training organizations which train to the competency levels described in CSA Standard Z275.4. Accredited commercial diver training organizations can also assess the competency of experienced commercial divers who were not trained at an accredited school, a form of recognition of prior learning.

==== Denmark ====
All professional diving activities carried out on Danish national territory (including its continental shelf and from Danish offshore vessels and platforms) must comply with the provisions of the Consolidated act on diving operations and diving equipment, etc. and Order no. 1395 on the safe performance of diving operations. Diving operations in Greenland are subject to different regulations.

The Danish Maritime Authority oversees all diving operations. In order to perform diving work, the professional diver must have completed and passed training programs at an approved diving schools. Training program content must comply with national and IDSA training standards.

==== Poland ====
In Poland "commercial diver" is a state-regulated profession and qualifications are awarded by the Maritime Office in Gdynia, according the Polish law of 17 October 2003.

There are four levels of diving qualifications for divers and supervisors. The diver's cards and logbooks are legally protected documents.

==== South Africa ====
In South Africa the Department of Employment and Labour regulates the activities of people who dive as part of their employment, except for those involved in diving connected to minerals and energy, who are nominally controlled by the Department of Minerals and Energy. Military diving is also officially within the jurisdiction of the Department of Employment and Labour, but provided the diving is conducted within the requirements of SA Naval Operations Publication 96 it is deemed to comply with the Diving Regulations of the Occupational Health and Safety Act 1993.

All commercial diver training is within the scope of the Diving Regulations, but recreational diver training and dive leading (divemasters) are specifically excluded from the regulations, though still subject to general provisions of the Occupational Health and Safety Act.

Commercial divers are registered with the Department of Employment and Labour after completing their training and assessment at registered commercial diving schools. The standard of training is officially specified in the Commercial Diver Training Standards for each class of diver, but the precise definitions for many of the specified items is unclear. However this is not unlike the standards for training in several other countries, as the SA standards are similar to the standards published by the International Diving Regulators and Certifiers Forum (IDRCF) of which the SA Department of Employment and Labour is a member.

==== United Kingdom ====
In the UK, any person diving at work is required to hold a relevant qualification approved by the Health and Safety Executive (HSE). Diving schools in the UK provide training to a HSE approved standard. Some HSE commercial diver qualifications are recognized by Australia (ADAS), Canada (DCBC), France, Norway, South Africa (DoEL) and in part by the International Marine Contractors Association (IMCA).

There are four basic HSE qualifications, focusing on different types of equipment and diving activity, starting with scuba, then surface supplied air, surface supplied with wet bell, and surface supplied with closed bell. Training usually takes place at a residential school, with courses taking anything between 9 and 13 weeks although divers with existing qualifications, such as former military divers can take courses which build on their existing knowledge and experience.

The UK Health and Safety Executive (HSE) publish a List of Approved Diving Qualifications which are approved for divers taking part in a diving project. Such divers may be classified as:

- Offshore Diving, for closed bell saturation diving, and for surface supplied, surface-oientated diving to a maximum depth of 50 metres,
- Inland/Inshore Diving in support of civil engineering or marine-related projects and fish farming,
- Shellfish Diving
- Scientific and Archaeological Diving
- Media Diving
- Recreational Diving
- Police Diving
- Military Diving
- Commercial Acquaint Diving

==== Others ====
Other countries known to have nationally regulated training and registration systems:

- France
- Norway

=== Engineer diver ===
A Master's degree titled Engineer Diver, for a professional who has the capacities, skills and knowledge needed to plan, manage and successfully execute an underwater operation concerning engineering practice, was proposed in 2007. The proposal does not appear to have been taken up. Examples of businesses that might benefit from the proposed qualification are civil infrastructures contractors (above and below water) where inspections, and maintenance projects are carried out periodically. That is the case of underwater inspections of ports, offshore platforms, vessels, bridges and dams.

== Demographics ==
Commercial diving is a male-dominated occupation in the US, with about 3000 people employed as commercial divers in fields mainly described as support industries for petroleum extraction, heavy and civil engineering and construction, and marine transportation.
