= Diving regulations =

Stipulations of the delegated legislation regarding the practice of underwater diving

Diving regulations are the stipulations of the delegated legislation regarding the practice of underwater diving. They apply within the national territory and territorial waters of a country. In most cases they apply to occupational diving, but in a few cases also to recreational diving. There are exemptions for recreational diving in some cases where it is recognised as a self-regulated industry. Offshore diving (outside of territorial waters) is generally outside the scope of diving regulations, and tends to be self-regulated through voluntary membership of industry organisations.

== Scope ==
The scope of diving regulations is generally defined in each specific set of regulations and the statutory law which empowers them, which can vary considerably across jurisdictions. Diving regulations apply within the national territorial waters of the country, and may also apply to diving operations conducted from a vessel registered in the country outside the national territorial waters.

== Alternatives ==
Diving regulations apply within the national territorial waters of the country. In general they do not apply in international waters, but the commercial diving industry operates in international waters, in what is generally known as the offshore diving industry. In these waters the industry is largely self-regulated through voluntary membership of organisations such as the International Marine Contractors Association (IMCA). Members of these organisations are required as a condition of membership to comply with their Codes of Practice.

In some jurisdictions specific exemptions and exceptions may be stipulated. For example:

- In the US, the American Academy of Underwater Sciences (AAUS) is responsible for the promulgation of the AAUS Standards for Scientific Diving Certification and Operation of Scientific Diving Programs. These are the consensual guidelines for scientific diving programs in the US, and are recognized by Occupational Safety and Health Administration as the "Standard" for scientific diving.
- In the US and South Africa, the recreational diver training and certification industry (professional recreational diving instructors) and the recreational diving tour guide and dive leader (professional divemasters) part of the recreational diving industry are excluded from the diving regulations as being part of a self-regulated industry. The organisations involved include the World Recreational Scuba Training Council (WRSTC) and the Confédération Mondiale des Activités Subaquatiques Technical committee.
- The Confédération Mondiale des Activités Subaquatiques Scientific committee was responsible for the development of the "Code of Practice for Scientific Diving: Principles for the Safe Practice of Scientific Diving in Different Environments" for UNESCO

In a few cases statutory law exists specifically covering diving activities.

- Israel: The Recreational diving Act, 1979
- Denmark and Greenland: Diving Act, Act No.307, dated 17 May 1995

== Examples ==
Argentina – The regulation of professional diving can be found in ordinance No. 4-08 (dpsn) Volume 5 Regime of Merchant Marine Personnel, July 1, 2008. The regulation of recreational diving can be found in ordinance No. 1-01 (dpsn) Volume 4 - Regime of nautical sports activities, 2001.

Australia

Queensland: – Safety in Recreational Water Activities Regulation 2011 (the Regulation) issued in terms of the Safety in Recreational Water Activities Act 2011 (the SRWA Act).

South Africa – Diving regulations to the Occupational Health and Safety Act, 1993, authorised by the Minister of Labour. The South African diving regulations regulate professional diving using breathing apparatus, and specifically exclude instruction of recreational divers and recreational dive leadership. They apply only where the Occupational Health and Safety Act applies, so do not cover diving in minerals and energy industries, which have different safety legislation.

There have been three versions of the Diving Regulations, dated 2001, 2009 (sometimes referred to as Diving Regulations 2010 at they were published in January 2010. and 2017. New regulations are drawn up with input from the Diving Advisory Board, a body appointed in terms of the existing regulations.

The Occupational Health and Safety Act applies to instruction of recreational divers and recreational dive leadership in general terms where these activities take place in a situation of employment.

Switzerland – Hyperbaric Worker Safety Ordinance, 15 April 2015 (German: Verordnung über die Sicherheit der Arbeitnehmerinnen und Arbeitnehmer bei Arbeiten im Überdruck, French: Ordonnance sur la sécurité des travailleurs lors de travaux en milieu hyperbare, Italian: Ordinanza sulla sicurezza dei lavoratori nei lavori in condizioni di sovrappressione)

United Kingdom – The Diving at Work Regulations 1997, Statutory Instruments 1997 No. 2776 Health and Safety

United States – Federal regulations: – Regulations (Standards - 29 CFR), Part Number: 1910, Occupational Safety and Health Standards, Subpart: T - Commercial Diving Operations. Standard Number: 1910.424 - SCUBA diving. Federal regulations have exemptions for scientific diving and for search and rescue in some states, when there is a reasonable expectation of rescuing a survivor.

== See also ==
- List of legislation regulating underwater diving – List of national and state legislation regulating underwater diving
