= Occupational Health and Safety Act, 1993 =

South African statutory law administered by the Department of Labour

The Occupational Health and Safety Act is a South African statutory law administered by the Department of Employment and Labour. The full title is No. 85 of 1993: Occupational Health and Safety Act as amended by. Occupational Health and Safety Amendment Act, No. 181 Of 1993 and the Labour Relations Act, No. 66 of 1995. Several regulations under the act are in force. The English version of the act was signed by the state president in June 1993.

The scope of the act is:

To provide for the health and safety of persons at work and for the health and safety of persons in connection with the use of plant and machinery; the protection of persons other than persons at work against hazards to health and safety arising out of or in connection with the activities of persons at work; to establish an advisory council for occupational health and safety; and to provide for matters connected therewith.

The act supersedes and repeals: The Machinery and Occupational Safety Act, 1983, the Machinery and Occupational Safety Amendment Act, 1989, and the Machinery and Occupational Safety Amendment Act, 1991.

The act enshrines the right to sit for South African workers, where reasonably applicable.

== Regulations under the act ==
- Asbestos Regulations, 2001 Regulations covering work that may expose workers to asbestos dust.
- Certificate of Competency Regulations, 1990 – Obtaining a Certificate of Competency for mechanical engineering.
- Construction Regulations, 2003 superseded by Construction Regulations 2014 – Regulations covering construction work.
- Diving Regulations 2001, superseded by Diving Regulations 2010. – Regulation of commercial diving activities.
  - Draft Diving Regulations 2018
- Driven Machinery Regulations, 1988, superseded by Driven Machinery regulations, 2011 and by Driven Machinery regulations, 2015
- Electrical Installation Regulations, 2003 superseded by Electrical Installation Regulations, 2009 and by Electrical Installation Regulations, 2013
- Electrical Machinery Regulations, 1988
- Environmental Regulations for Workplaces, 1987
- Explosives Regulations, 2003
- Facilities Regulations, 1990 Regulations covering facilities that must be provided at the workplace by employers.
- General Administrative Regulations, 2003 – Specifies the administrative procedures of the Occupational Health and Safety Act
- General Machinery Regulations, 1988
- General Safety Regulations – Regulations covering the general safety of workers at the workplace.
- Hazardous Biological Agents Regulations – Safety regulations for working with hazardous biological agents
- Hazardous Chemical Substance Regulations – Regulations covering all work with hazardous chemical substances.
  - Draft Regulations for Hazardous Chemical Agents
- Lead Regulations, 2001
- Lift, Escalator & Passenger Conveyor Regulations, 1994 superseded by Lift Escalator and Passenger Conveyor Regulations, 2009 – Duidelines for lifts, escalators and passenger conveyors
- Major Hazard Installation Regulations
- Noise-induced Hearing Loss Regulations, 2003
- Pressure Equipment Regulations, 2009
- Regulation of Hazardous Work by Children in SA
