= Diving activities =

Things people do while diving underwater

Diving activities

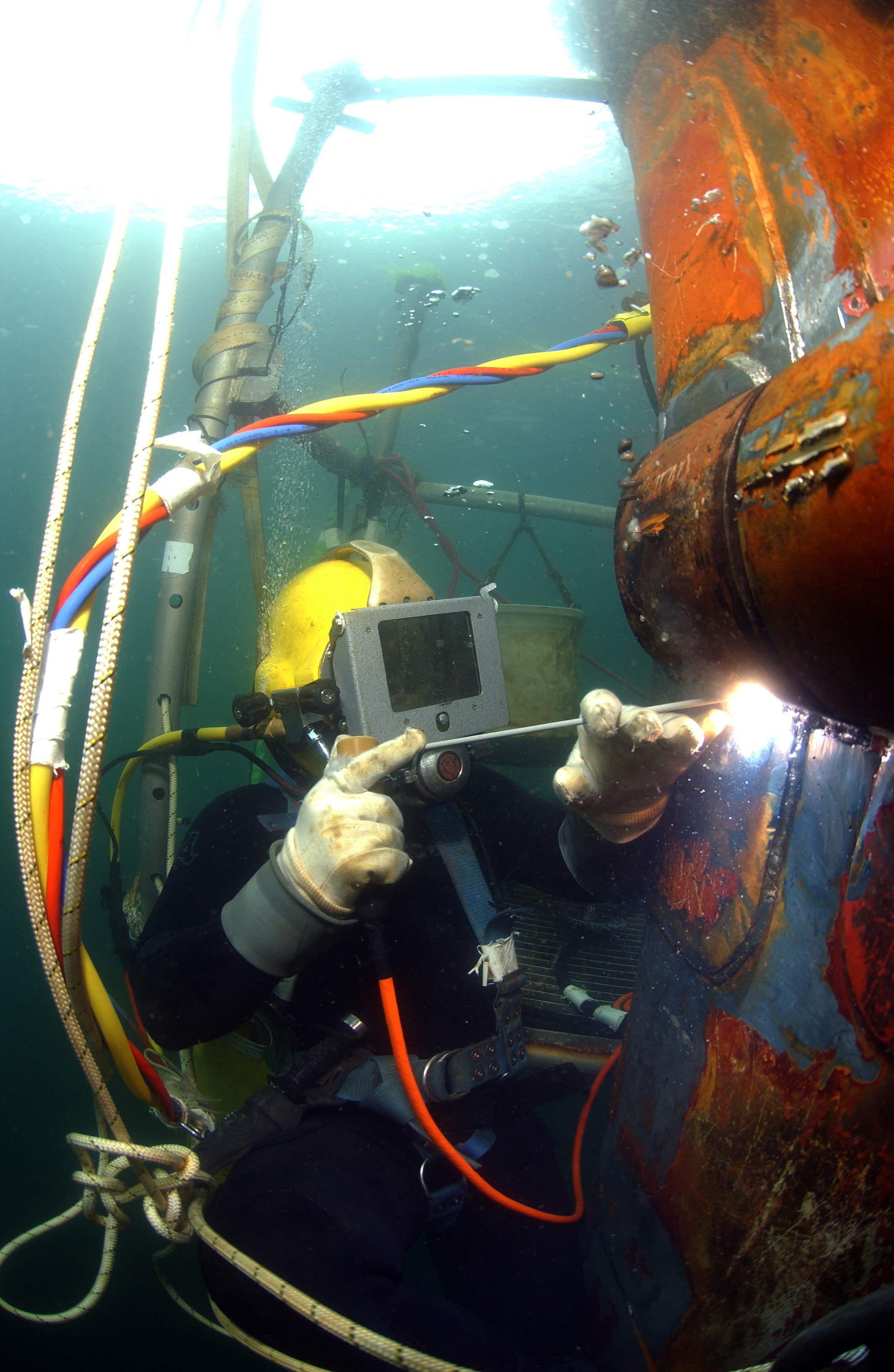
Ship repair work may involve underwater welding

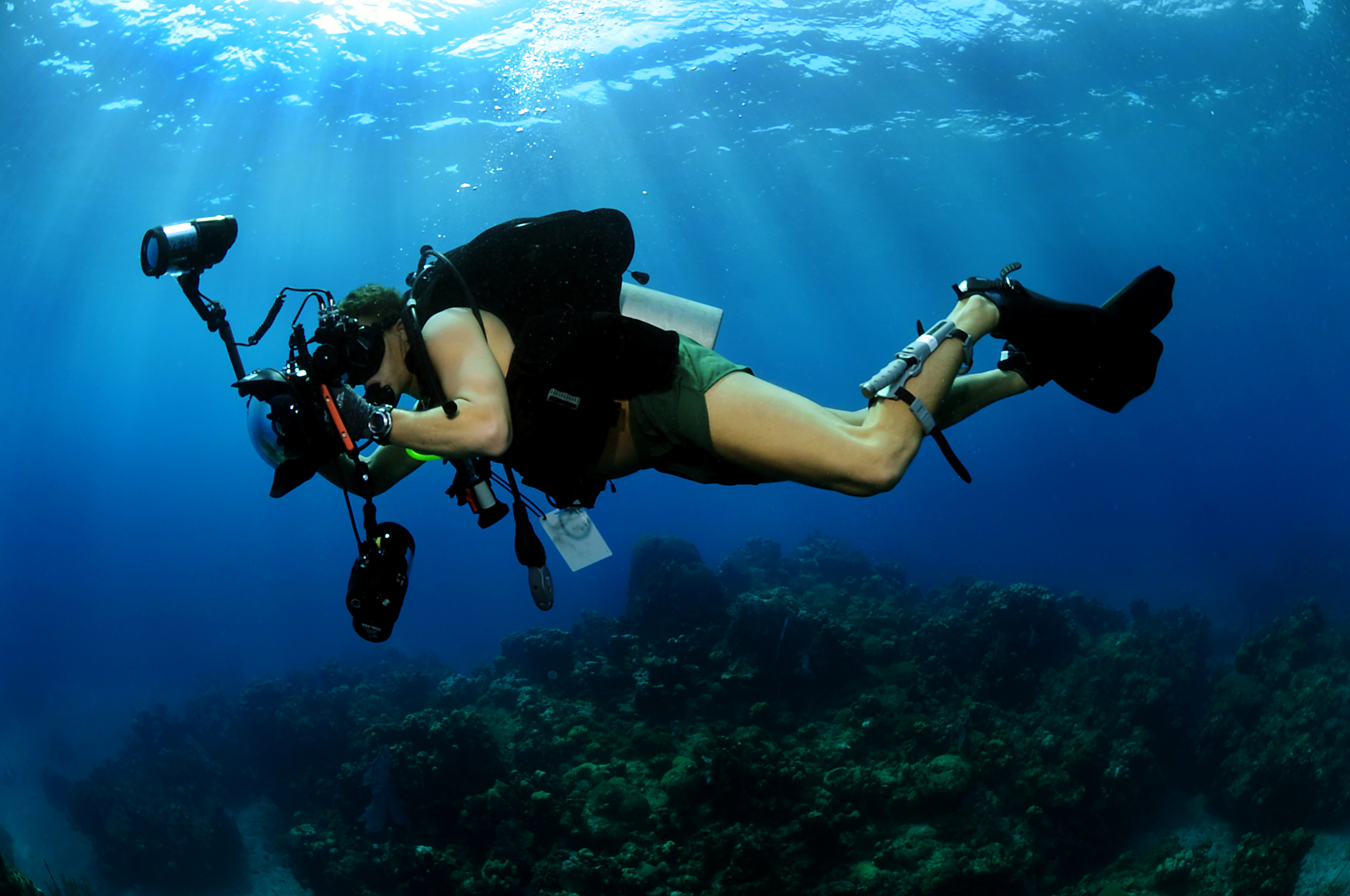
Underwater photography is done by recreational and professional divers.

Diving activities are the things people do while diving underwater. People may dive for various reasons, both personal and professional. While a newly qualified recreational diver may dive purely for the experience of diving, most divers have some additional reason for being underwater. Recreational diving is purely for enjoyment and has several specialisations and technical disciplines to provide more scope for varied activities for which specialist training can be offered, such as cave diving, wreck diving, ice diving and deep diving. Several underwater sports are available for exercise and competition.

There are various aspects of professional diving that range from part-time work to lifelong careers. Professionals in the recreational diving industry include instructor trainers, diving instructors, assistant instructors, divemasters, dive guides, and scuba technicians. A scuba diving tourism industry has developed to service recreational diving in regions with popular dive sites. Commercial diving is industry related and includes civil engineering tasks such as in oil exploration, offshore construction, dam maintenance and harbour works. Commercial divers may also be employed to perform tasks related to marine activities, such as naval diving, ships husbandry, marine salvage or aquaculture. Other specialist areas of diving include military diving, with a long history of military frogmen in various roles. They can perform roles including direct combat, reconnaissance, infiltration behind enemy lines, placing mines, bomb disposal or engineering operations.

In civilian operations, police diving units perform search and rescue operations, and recover evidence. In some cases diver rescue teams may also be part of a fire department, paramedical service, sea rescue or lifeguard unit, and this may be classed as public safety diving. There are also professional media divers such as underwater photographers and videographers, who record the underwater world, and scientific divers in fields of study which involve the underwater environment, including marine biologists, geologists, hydrologists, oceanographers and underwater archaeologists.

The choice between scuba and surface-supplied diving equipment is based on both legal and logistical constraints. Where the diver requires mobility and a large range of movement, scuba is usually the choice if safety and legal constraints allow. Higher risk work, particularly commercial diving, may be restricted to surface-supplied equipment by legislation and codes of practice.

== Diving procedures ==
The standard procedures and activities essential to safe diving in the chosen diving mode, using the chosen diving equipment, and in the chosen diving environment are inherently part of the activities of a dive. Monitoring the dive profile, gas supplies, decompression status, relative positions of the divers and communication associated with these are all standard operating procedures. Contingency procedures associated with the diving mode, equipment and foreseeable diversions from the dive plan may also be necessary. These activities may be considered as occurring in the background, as in most cases they are not the reason for the dive.

=== Navigation ===
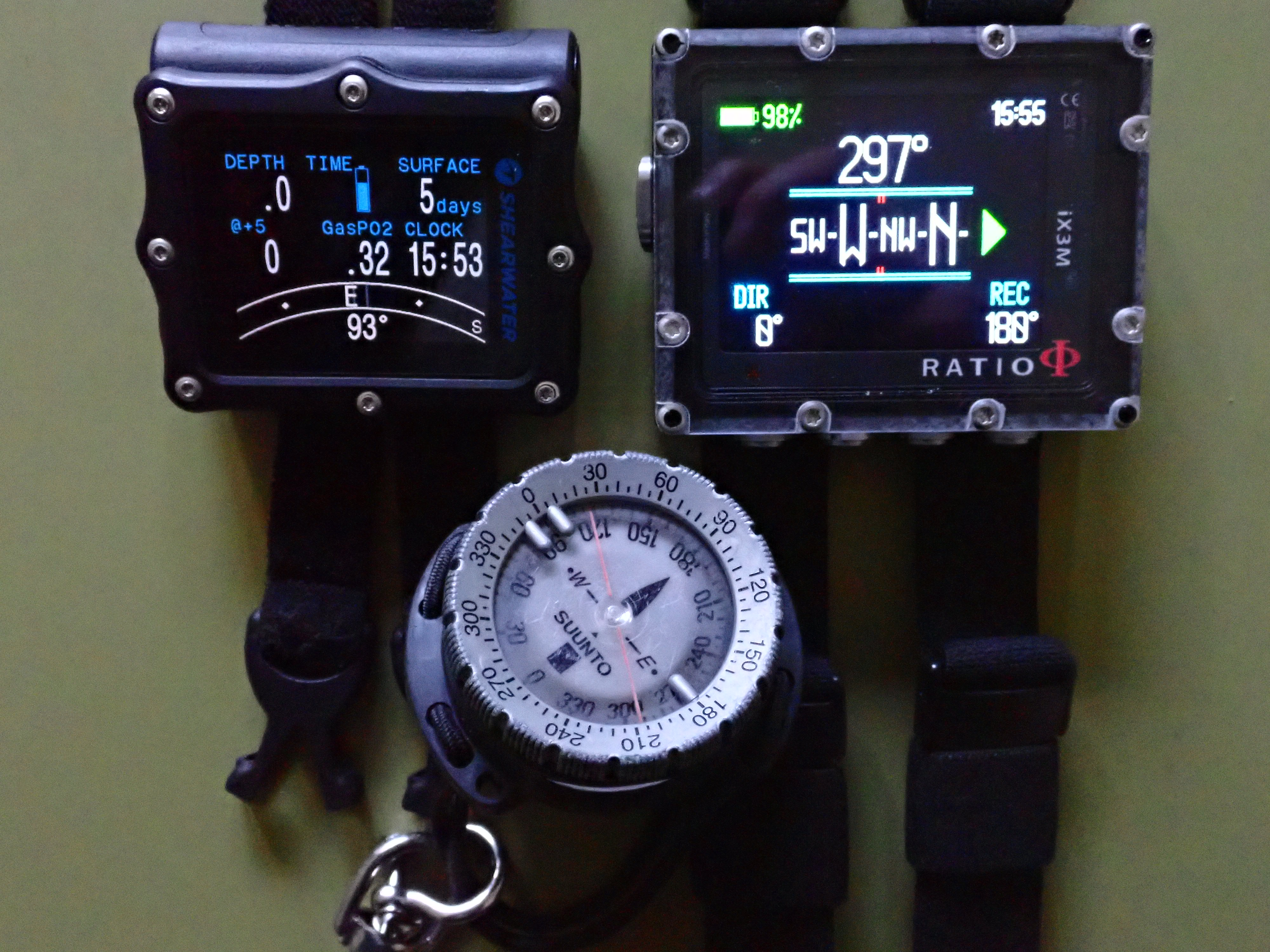
Shearwater Perdix and Ratio iX3M GPS dive computers in compass mode with Suunto SK7 magnetic compass in close proximity

Navigation is a common activity during dives. Diver navigation, termed "underwater navigation" by scuba divers, is a set of techniques—including observing natural features, the use of a compass, and surface observations—that divers use to navigate underwater. Free-divers do not spend enough time underwater for navigation to be important, and surface supplied divers are limited in the distance they can travel by the length of their umbilicals and are usually directed from the surface control point. On those occasions when they need to navigate they can use the same methods used by scuba divers. When it is critical for safety to return to a specific place, a distance line is generally used. This may be laid and left in place for other divers, or recovered on the return leg. Use of distance lines is standard in penetration diving, where the divers cannot ascend directly to the surface at all times, and it is possible to lose track of the route out to open water.

=== Searches ===
Searches are a fairly common diving activity, and may be the primary purpose of the dive, part of a more complex activity plan, or incidental. Underwater searches are procedures to find a known or suspected target object or objects in a specified search area under water. A search method attempts to provide full coverage of the search area, by using a search pattern, which should completely cover the search area without excessive redundancy or missed areas.

=== Operation of special equipment ===
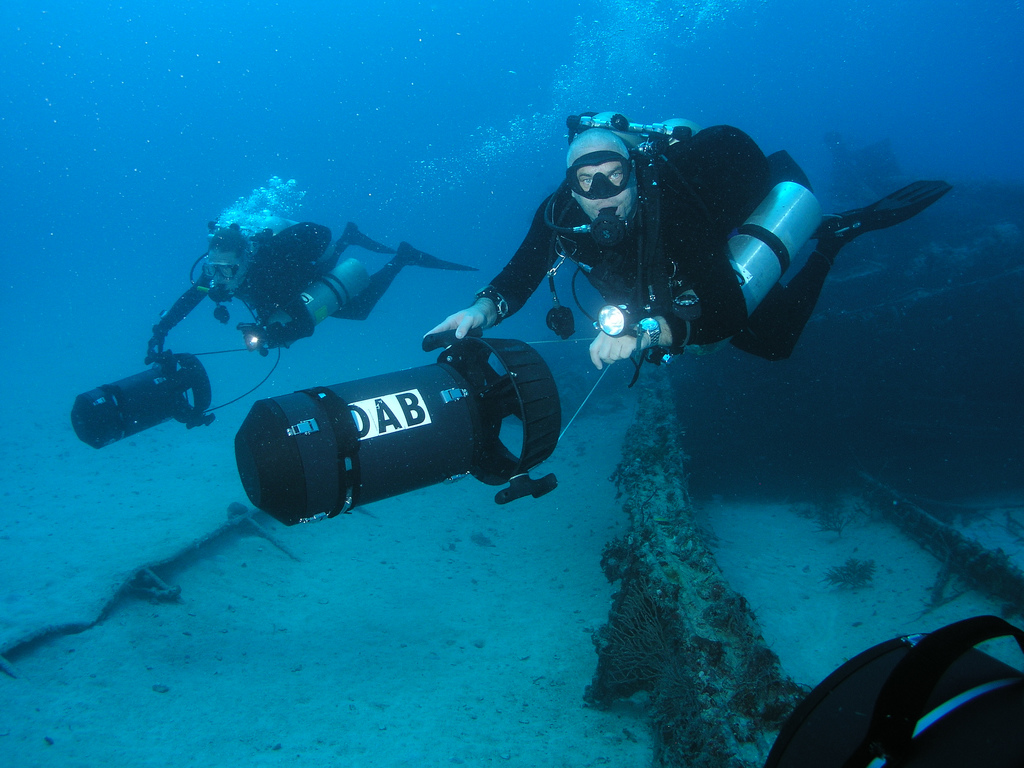
Two divers scootering with heavy duty DPVs

A diver propulsion vehicle is a type of diving equipment sometimes used by scuba divers to increase range underwater. Range is restricted by the amount of breathing gas that can be carried, the rate at which that breathing gas is consumed, and the battery power of the DPV. Time limits imposed on the diver by decompression requirements may also limit safe range in practice. DPVs have recreational, scientific and military applications.

== Exploration ==
There is often an element of exploration in diving activity, as it is common to dive in an unfamiliar place. This exploration may be casual or focused on gathering information which can be shared or recorded and published for use by others. A large part of the waters accessible to divers remains virtually unknown, and has not been surveyed or mapped in detail, and in many cases, has not yet been visited by divers. Exploration has been identified as one of the major motivations for recreational diving, but it is mostly casual and seldom results in recorded reports which can be of use to others.

== Underwater work ==
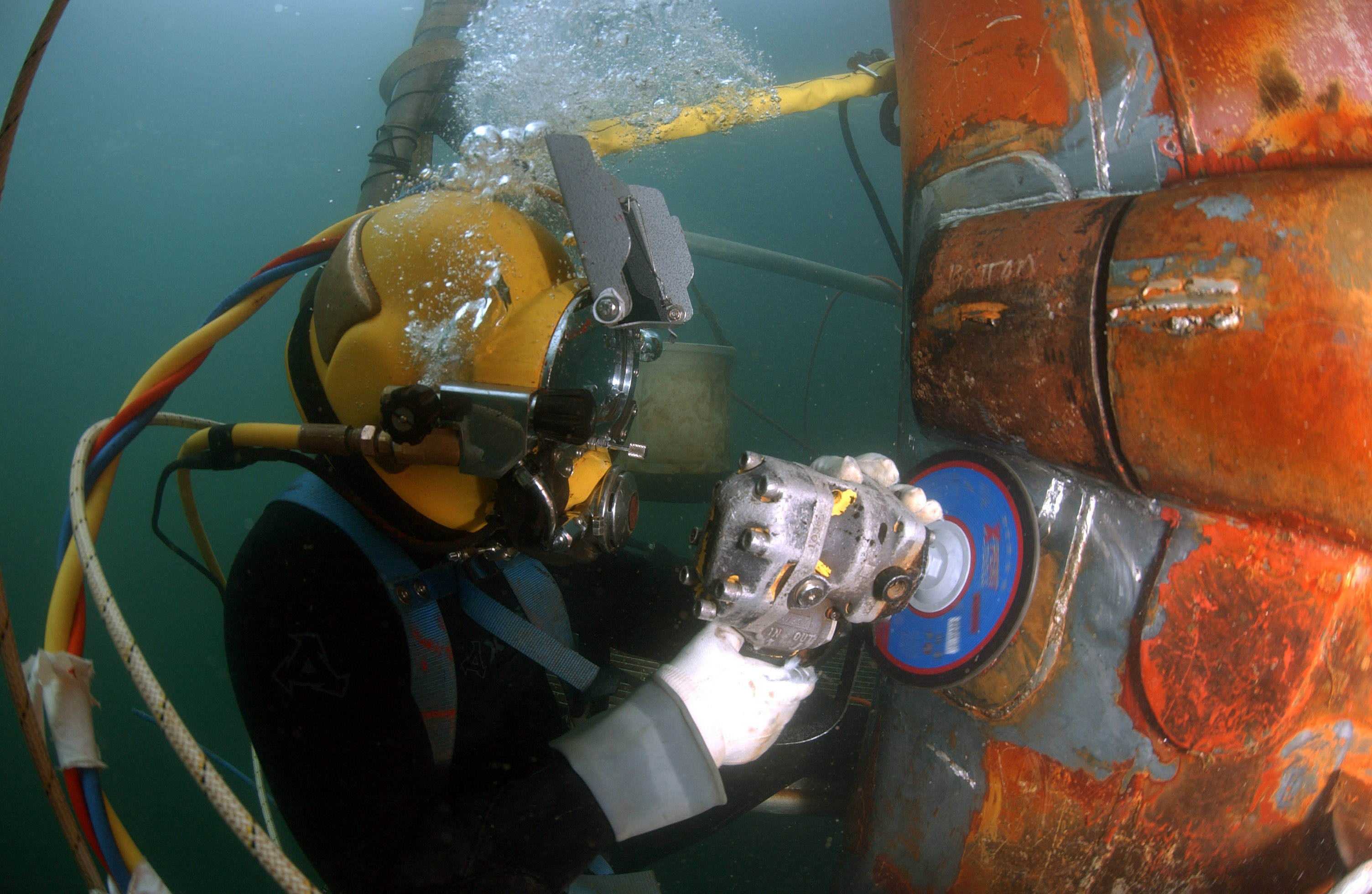
A US Navy diver diversat work. The umbilical supplying air from the surface is clearly visible.

Underwater work is usually done by professional divers who are paid for their work. The procedures are often regulated by legislation and codes of practice as it is an inherently hazardous occupation and the diver works as a member of a team. Due to the dangerous nature of some professional diving operations, specialized equipment such as an on-site hyperbaric chamber and diver-to-surface communication system is often required by law, and the mode of diving for some applications may be regulated.

There are several branches of professional diving, the best known of which is probably commercial diving and its specialised applications. There are also applications in scientific research, marine archaeology, fishing and aquaculture, public service, law enforcement, military service, media work and diver training. Specialist training may be required for some aspects of this work.

=== Commercial diving ===
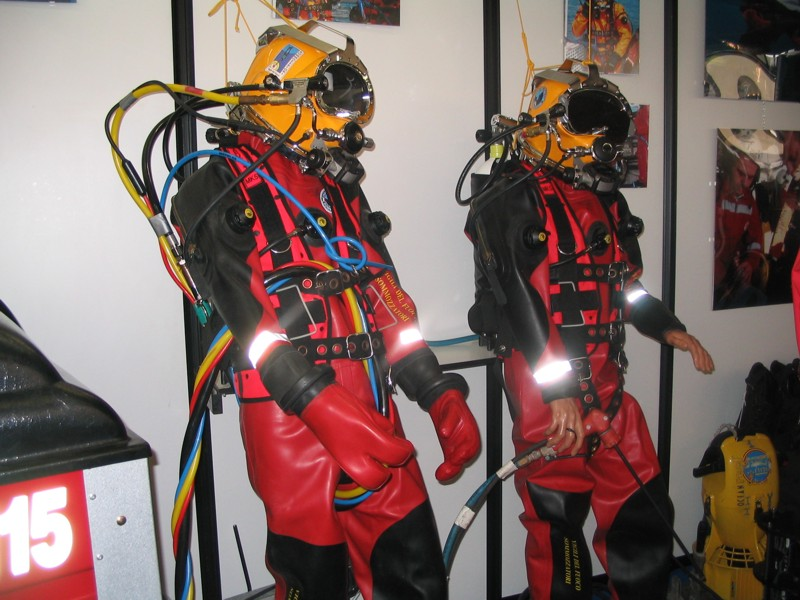
Surface supplied commercial diving equipment on display at a trade show

Commercial diving may be considered an application of professional diving where the diver engages in underwater work for industrial, construction, engineering, maintenance or other commercial purposes which are similar to work done out of the water, and where the diving is usually secondary to the work.

==== Offshore diving ====
Commercial offshore diving, sometimes shortened to just offshore diving, generally refers to the branch of commercial diving, with divers working in support of the exploration and production sector of the oil and gas industry. The work in this area of the industry includes maintenance of oil platforms and the building of underwater structures. In this context "offshore" implies that the diving work is done outside of national boundaries. Technically it also refers to any diving done in the international offshore waters outside of the territorial waters of a state, where national legislation does not apply. Most commercial offshore diving is in the exclusive economic zone of a state, and much of it is outside the territorial waters. The type of work includes tasks such as wellhead completion, submarine pipeline monitoring and inspection, assembly of manifolds and work on moorings, including rigging, lifting, and assembly of components.

==== Salvage diving ====
Salvage diving is the diving work associated with marine salvage, the recovery of all or part of ships, their cargoes, aircraft, and other vehicles and structures which have sunk or fallen into water. In the case of ships it may also refer to repair work done to make an abandoned or distressed but still floating vessel more suitable for towing or propulsion under its own power. The recreational/technical activity known as wreck diving is generally not considered salvage work, though some recovery of artifacts may be done by recreational divers.

Most salvage diving is commercial or military work, depending on the diving contractor and the purpose for the salvage operation, Similar underwater work may be done by divers as part of forensic investigations into accidents, in which case the procedures may be more closely allied with underwater archaeology than the more basic procedures of advantageous cost/benefit expected in commercial and military operations.

==== Hazmat diving ====
Hazmat diving generally refers to the presence of hazardous materials in the diving environment, but some classes of underwater work are inherently in a hazardous materials environment, including nuclear diving and sewer diving.

==== Underwater inspection ====
Inspection of underwater structures, installations, and sites is a common professional diving activity, applicable to planning, installation, and maintenance phases, but the required skills are often specific to the application. Much use is made of video and still photographic evidence, and live video to allow direction of the inspection work by the supervisor and topside specialists. Inspections may also involve surface preparation, often by cleaning, and non-destructive testing.

==== Potable water diving ====
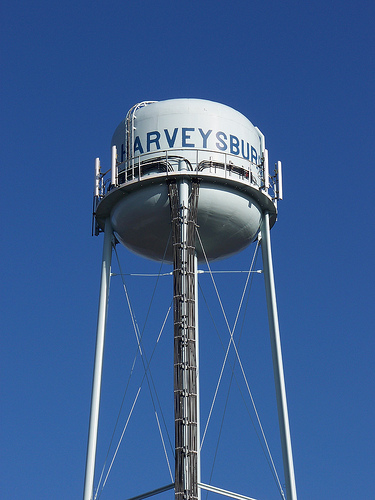
Inspection of the interior of a municipal water tower requires specialized training and safety equipment.

Potable water diving is diving inside a tank that is used for potable water. This is usually done for inspection and cleaning tasks. A person who is trained to do this work may be described as a potable water diver. The risks to the diver associated with potable water diving are related to the access, confined spaces and outlets for the water. The risk of contamination of the water is managed by isolating the diver in a clean dry-suit and helmet or full-face mask which are decontaminated before the dive.

==== Ships husbandry ====
Ships husbandry is all aspects of maintenance, cleaning, and general upkeep of the hull, rigging, and equipment of a ship. It may also be used to refer to aspects of maintenance which are not specifically covered by the technical departments. The term is used in both naval and merchant shipping, but 'naval vessel husbandry' may also be used for specific reference to naval vessels. Underwater ships husbandry includes hull cleaning, inspection, and some kinds of repair work.

==== Underwater construction ====
Underwater construction is industrial construction in an underwater environment. There is often, but not necessarily, a significant component of commercial diving involved. It is a part of the marine construction industry. Concrete work is a common component of underwater construction, and may involve site clearing and preparation by suction dredging, airlifting, high pressure and abrasive waterjetting, in-water surface cleaning using brushcarts, shuttering and formwork, bagwork, and setup of reinforcement. Underwater concrete placement may be by tremie, pumped concrete, skip placement, or toggle bags. Concrete repair, and assembly of pre-cast components often involves grouting. Other work may include fitting fixing bolts by drilling and core drilling, pipe installation (outfalls), pipeline support and protection, using mattresses for ballast and scour protection, and underwater welding.

==== Underwater mining and mineral extraction ====
- Underwater mining
- Diamonds off the Orange River mouth
- Amber in the Baltic sea (historical)
- Gold in rivers

=== Military diving ===
Underwater divers may be employed in any branch of an armed force, including the navy, army, marines, air force and coast guard. Scope of operations includes: search and recovery, search and rescue, hydrographic survey, explosive ordnance disposal, demolition, underwater engineering, salvage, ships husbandry, reconnaissance, infiltration, sabotage, counterinfiltration, underwater combat and security.

Clearance diving, the removal of obstructions and hazards to navigation, is closely related to salvage diving, but has a different purpose, in that the objects to be removed are not intended to be recovered, just removed or reduced to a condition where they no longer constitute a hazard or obstruction. Many of the techniques and procedures used in clearance diving are also used in salvage work.

Submarine rescue is the process of locating a sunk submarine with survivors on board, and bringing the survivors to safety. This may be done by recovering the vessel to the surface first, or by transferring the trapped personnel to a rescue bell or deep-submergence rescue vehicle to bring them to the surface. Submarine rescue may be done at pressures between ambient at depth, and sea level atmospheric pressure, depending on the condition of the disabled vessel and the equipment used for the rescue. Associated diving work may include preparing the submarine for access by a rescue bell or rescue submersible, if the depth allows human intervention. Recent developments tend to favour the use of remotely operated vehicles dedicated to this application.

=== Public service ===
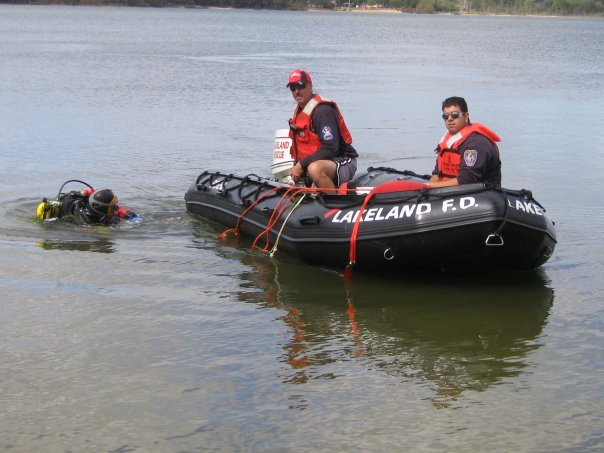
Nesconset fire department scuba rescue team on training exercise

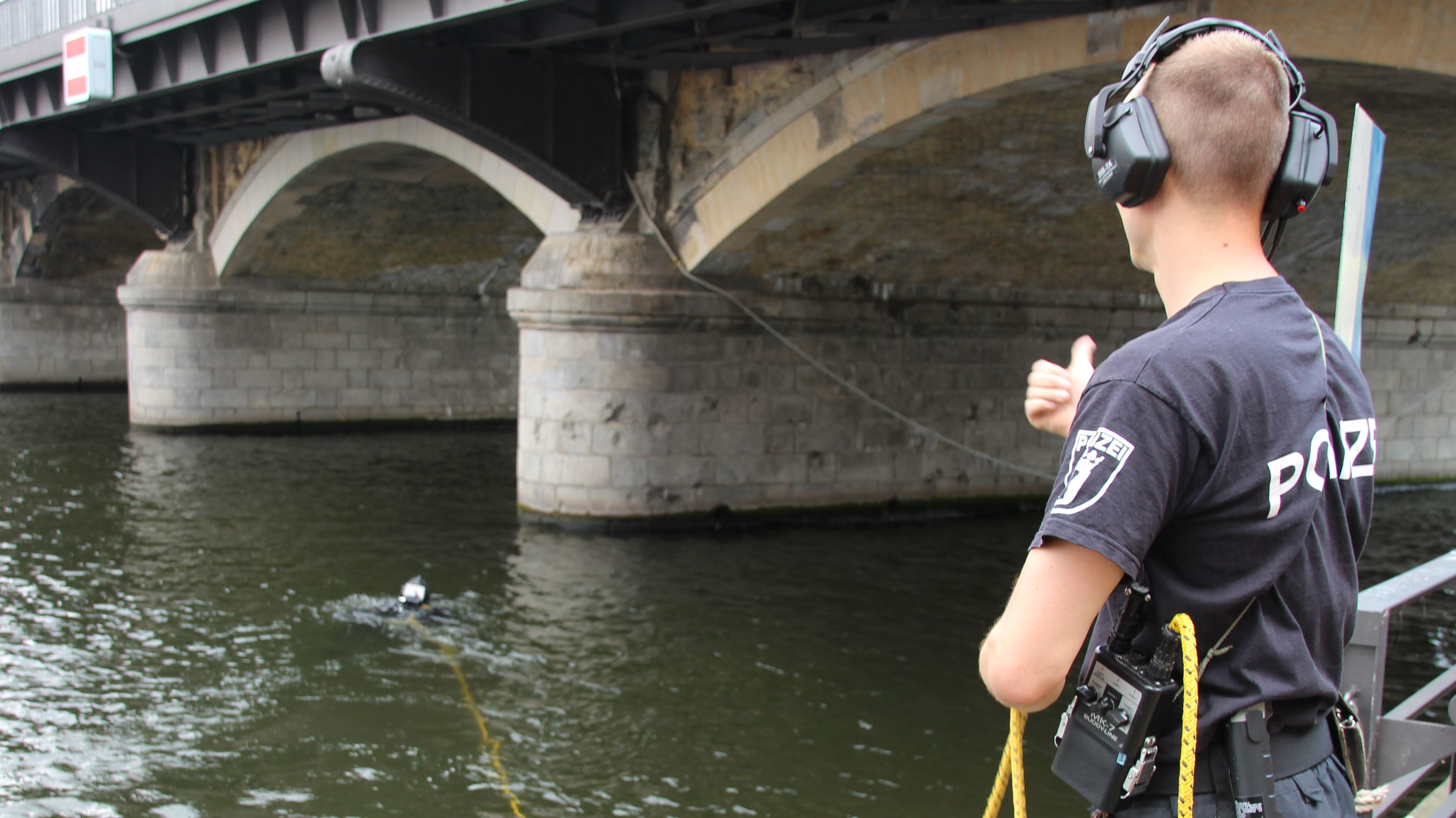
Police divers in a river in Berlin

Public safety diving is underwater diving conducted as part of law enforcement and search and rescue. Their work includes underwater rescue, underwater recovery and underwater investigation conducted by divers working for or under the authority of municipal, state or federal agencies. These divers are typically members of police departments, sheriff's offices, fire rescue agencies, search and rescue teams or providers of emergency medical services. Public safety divers differ from recreational, scientific and commercial divers who can generally plan the date, time, and location of a dive, and dive only if the conditions are conducive to the task. Public safety divers respond to emergencies 24 hours a day, 7 days a week, and may be required to dive in the middle of the night, during inclement weather, in zero visibility "black water," or in waters polluted by chemicals and biohazards. Much of their work involves Underwater searches.

Police diving is a branch of professional diving carried out by police services. Police divers are usually sworn police officers, and may either be employed full-time as divers or as general water police officers, or be volunteers who usually serve in other units but are called in if their diving services are required. The duties carried out by police divers include rescue diving for underwater casualties and search and recovery diving for evidence and bodies.

=== Scientific ===
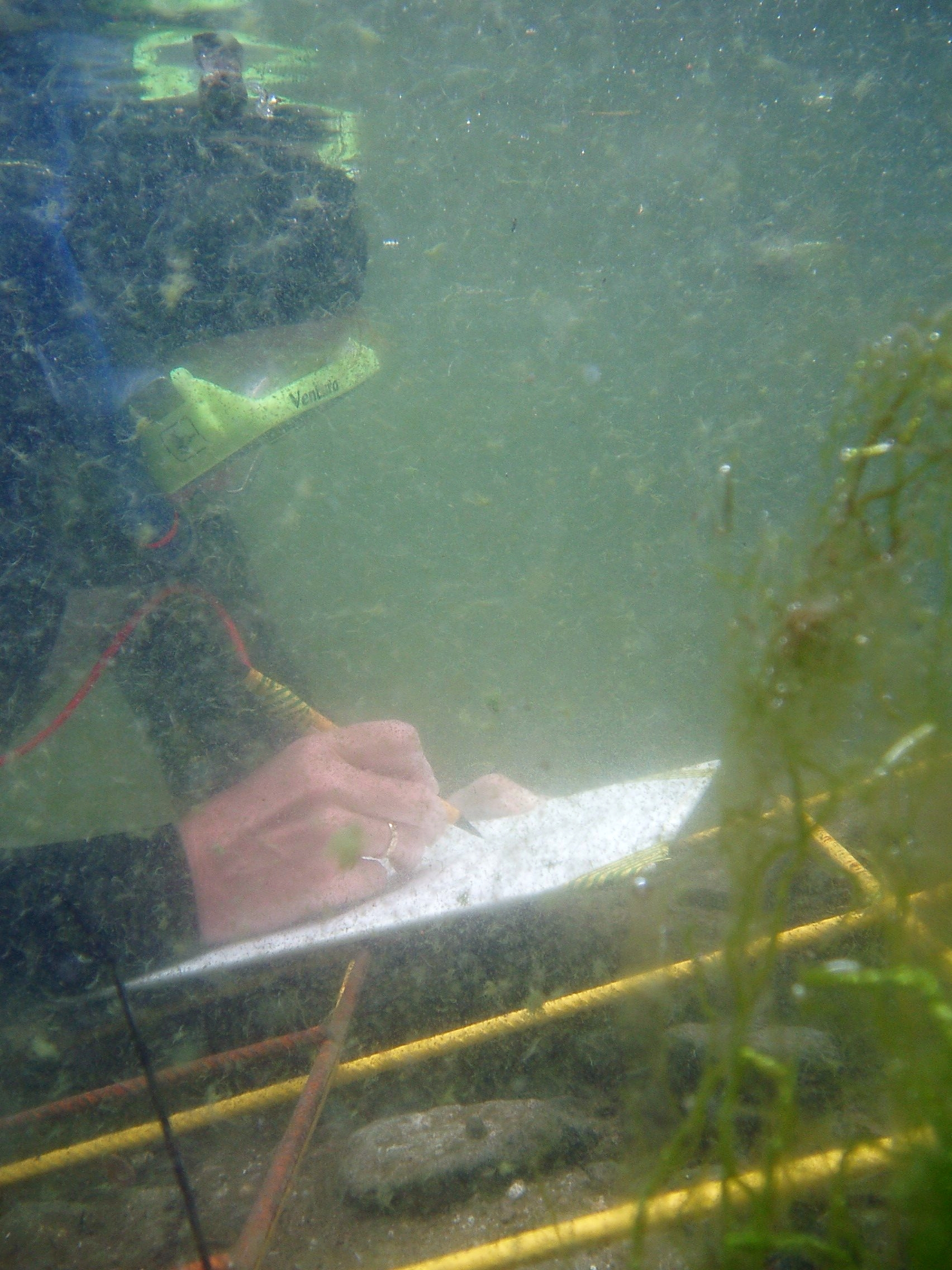
A scientific diver at work

Scientific diving is the use of underwater diving techniques by scientists to perform work underwater in the direct pursuit of scientific knowledge. Scientific divers are normally qualified scientists first and divers second, who use diving equipment and techniques as their way to get to the location of their fieldwork. The direct observation and manipulation of marine habitats afforded to scuba-equipped scientists have transformed the marine sciences generally, and marine biology and marine chemistry in particular. Underwater archeology and geology are other examples of sciences pursued underwater. Some scientific diving is carried out by universities in support of undergraduate or postgraduate research programs, and government bodies such as the United States Environmental Protection Agency and the UK Environment Agency carry out scientific diving to recover samples of water, marine organisms and sea, lake or riverbed material to examine for signs of pollution.

Activities are widely varied and may include visual counts and measurements of organisms in situ, collection of samples, underwater surveys, photography, videography, video mosaicing, benthic coring, coral coring, and deployment, maintenance and retrieval of scientific equipment. Surveys include site surveys, geological surveys, baseline and monitoring ecological surveys, which may involve the use of transect and quadrat methodology. A bibliographic analysis of papers published between 1995 and 2006 that have been supported by scientific diving shows that diving supports scientific research through efficient and targeted sampling. Activities include collection of specimen organisms and biological samples, observing and recording animal behaviour, quantitative surveys, in situ measurements, impact studies, ecological analyses, evaluation of techniques, mapping underwater areas, profiling geology, and deploying and retrieving underwater equipment.

=== Media and entertainment ===
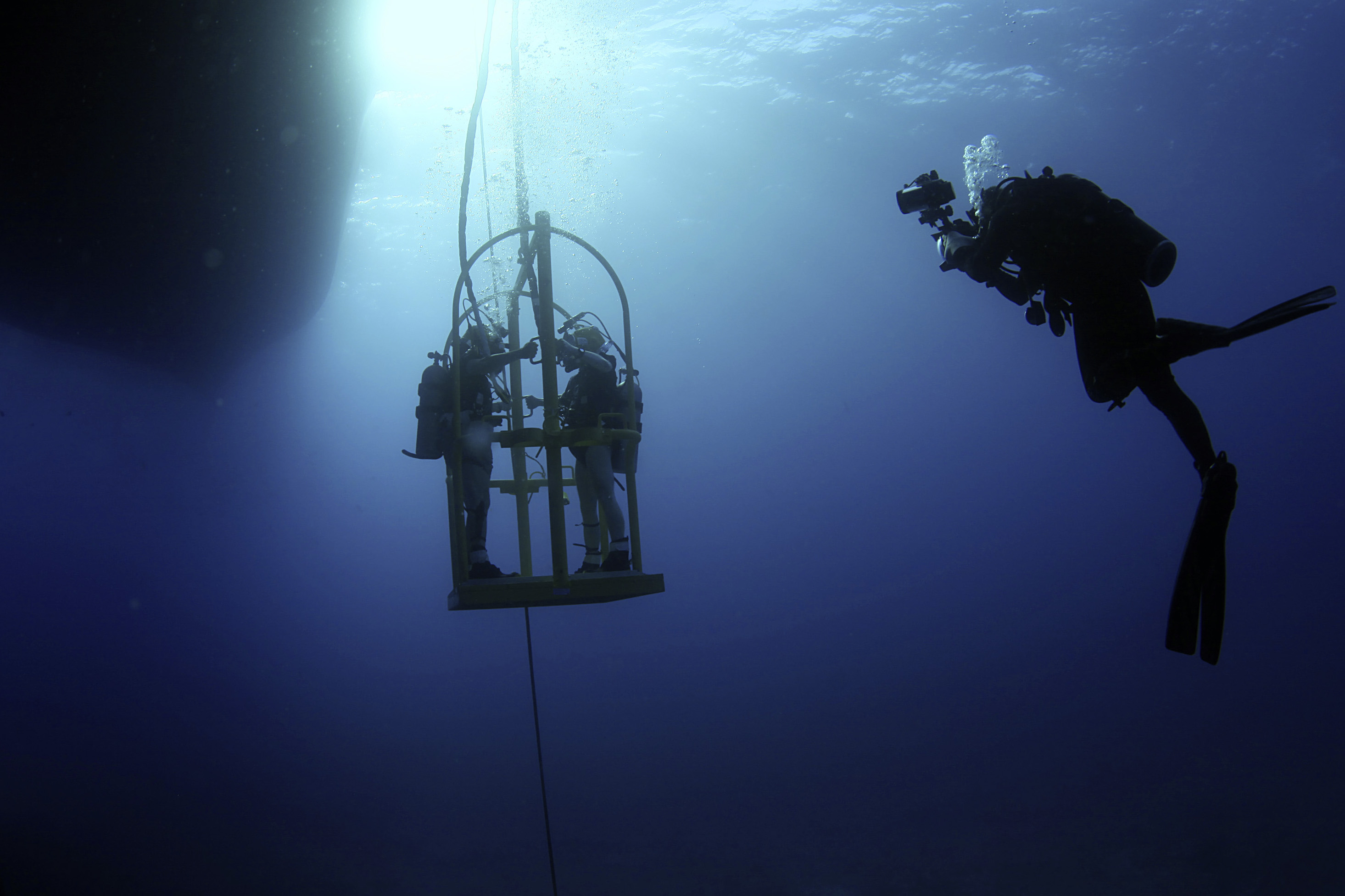
Underwater photographer documenting a surface supplied dive.

Media diving is underwater diving in support of the media industries, including the practice of underwater photography and underwater cinematography and underwater videography outside of normal recreational interests. Media diving is often carried out in support of television documentaries featuring underwater photography or footage. Media divers are normally highly skilled camera operators who use diving as a method to reach their workplace, although some underwater photographers start as recreational divers and move on to make a living from their hobby. Equipment in this field is varied with scuba and surface supplied equipment used, depending on requirements, but rebreathers are often used for wildlife related work as they are normally quiet, release few or no bubbles and allow the diver a lengthy bottom time with a reduced risk of frightening off the subject.

=== Tourism ===
Scuba diving tourism is the industry based on servicing the requirements of recreational divers at destinations other than where they live. It includes aspects of training, equipment sales, rental and service, guided experiences and environmental tourism. The diving activity most associated with work in the diving tourism industry is leading dives. Dive leader is the title of an internationally recognised recreational diving certification for the occupation of "dive guide", which is a specialist underwater application of "tour guide". Several other titles are also used, including "Divemaster". This is a role that includes organising and leading recreational dives, particularly in a professional capacity,

=== Diver training ===
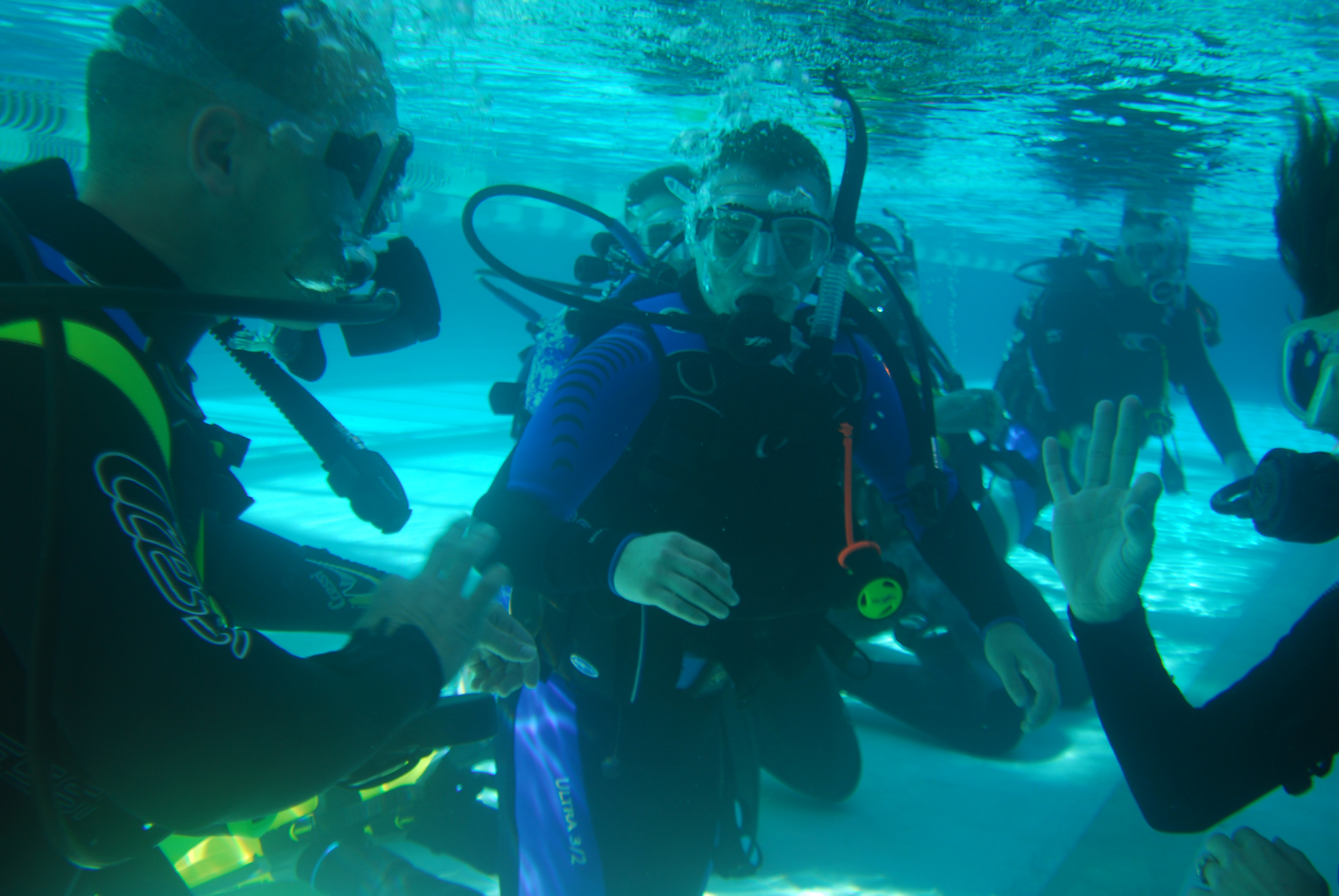
Instructor and learner divers practicing scuba skills in confined water

Diver training is the set of processes through which a person learns the necessary and desirable skills to safely dive underwater within the scope of the diver training standard relevant to the specific training programme. Most diver training follows procedures and schedules laid down in the associated training standard, in a formal training programme, and includes practical skills training in the safe use of the associated equipment in the specified underwater environment, and assessment of the required skills and knowledge deemed necessary by the certification agency to allow the newly certified diver to dive within the specified range of conditions at an acceptable level of risk. Practical training and assessment of skills largely occurs underwater, in the presence of a diving instructor, who is responsible for the safety of the trainee while under instruction or assessment.

=== Aquaculture, fishing and harvesting of organisms underwater ===
Aquaculture is the controlled cultivation ("farming") of aquatic organisms such as fish, crustaceans, mollusks, algae and other organisms of value such as aquatic plants (e.g. lotus). Aquaculture involves cultivating freshwater, brackish water and saltwater populations under controlled or semi-natural conditions, and can be contrasted with commercial fishing, which is the harvesting of wild fish. There are many underwater activities associated with aquaculture which can be done by divers, including monitoring stock health and fish pen maintenance.

Spearfishing is a method of fishing that involves impaling the fish with a straight pointed object such as a spear, gig or harpoon. It has been deployed in artisanal fishing throughout the world for millennia. Modern spearfishing usually involves the use of underwater swimming gear and slingshot-like elastic powered spearguns or compressed gas powered pneumatic spearguns, which launch a tethered underwater projectile to strike the target fish. Specialised techniques and equipment have been developed for various types of aquatic environments and target fish. Spearfishing may be done using free-diving, snorkelling or scuba diving techniques.

Abalone, lobster, sea urchins and various other marine invertebrates can be collected by hand or with the assistance of hand tools while diving.

Pearl hunting is the activity of recovering pearls from wild molluscs, usually oysters or mussels, in the sea or freshwater. Pearl hunting was prevalent in the Persian Gulf region and Japan for thousands of years. On the northern and north-western coast of Western Australia pearl diving began in the 1850s, where the term also covers diving for nacre or mother of pearl found in what were known as pearl shells. In most cases the pearl-bearing molluscs live at depths where they are not manually accessible from the surface. Historically the molluscs were retrieved by freediving, When the standard diving suit became available it was applied to pearl hunting.

Sponge diving, is diving to collect soft natural sponges for human use as personal cleaning tools. It is one of the oldest known underwater diving activities, dating back to classical times, and was also originally a freediving activity which later made use of the standard diving helmet.

== Recreational activities ==
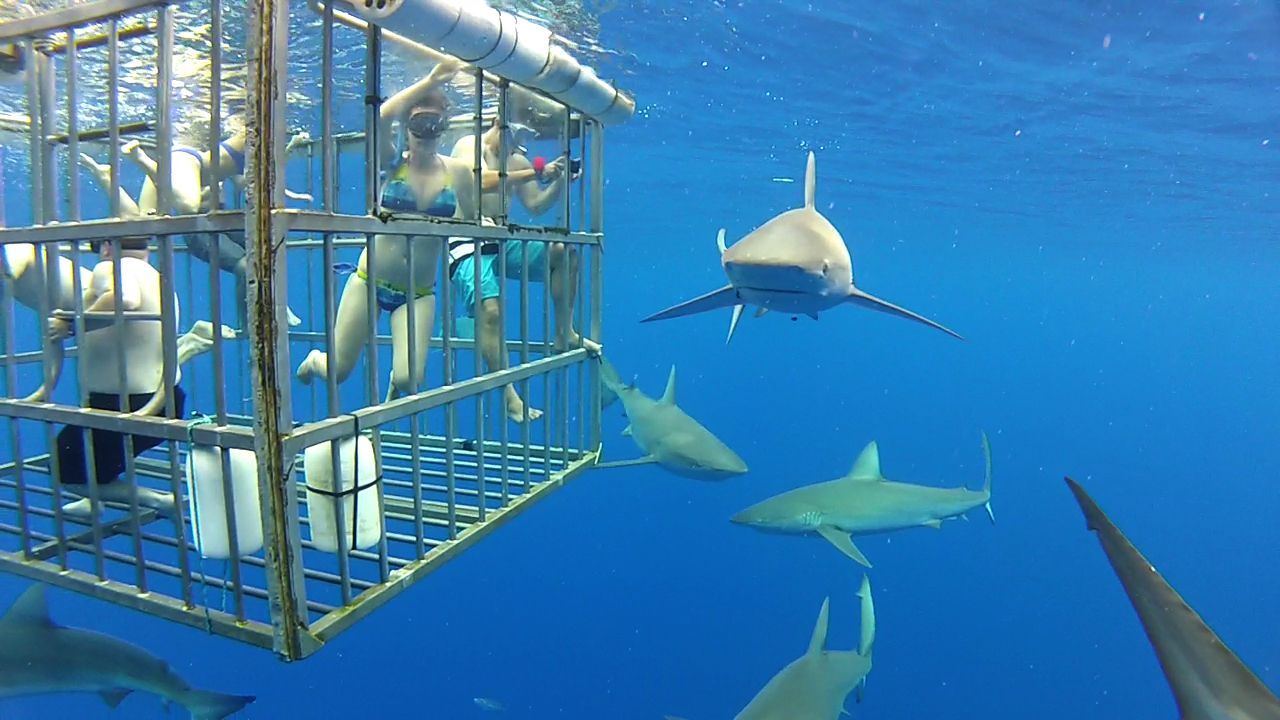
Shark cage diving

Professional diving is done where the job is, but recreational divers have the freedom to choose where they dive, based on convenience, cost, their chosen underwater activities, and the characteristics of the environment at the available dive sites. Many recreational divers dive mainly in their home waters, but others will travel to sites where their preferences are more likely to be available.

Scuba diving tourism is the industry based on servicing the requirements of recreational divers at destinations other than where they live. It includes aspects of training, equipment sales, rental and service, guided experiences and environmental tourism.

Motivations to travel for scuba diving are complex and may vary considerably during the diver's development and experience. Participation can vary from once off to multiple dedicated trips per year over several decades. The popular destinations fall into several groups, including tropical reefs, shipwrecks and cave systems, each frequented by its own group of enthusiasts, with some overlap. Temperate and inland open water reef sites are generally dived by people who live relatively nearby.

Shark tourism is a form of eco-tourism that allows people to dive with sharks in their natural environment. This benefits local shark populations by educating tourists and through funds raised by the shark tourism industry. People can get close to the sharks by freediving or scuba diving or by entering the water in a protective cage for more aggressive species.

=== Scuba activities ===
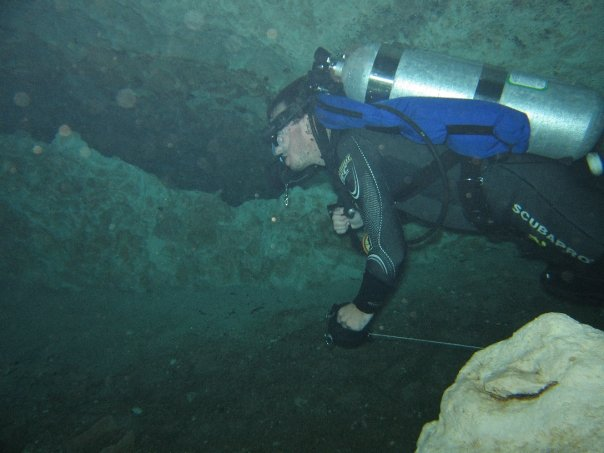
A cave diver running a reel with guide line into the overhead environment

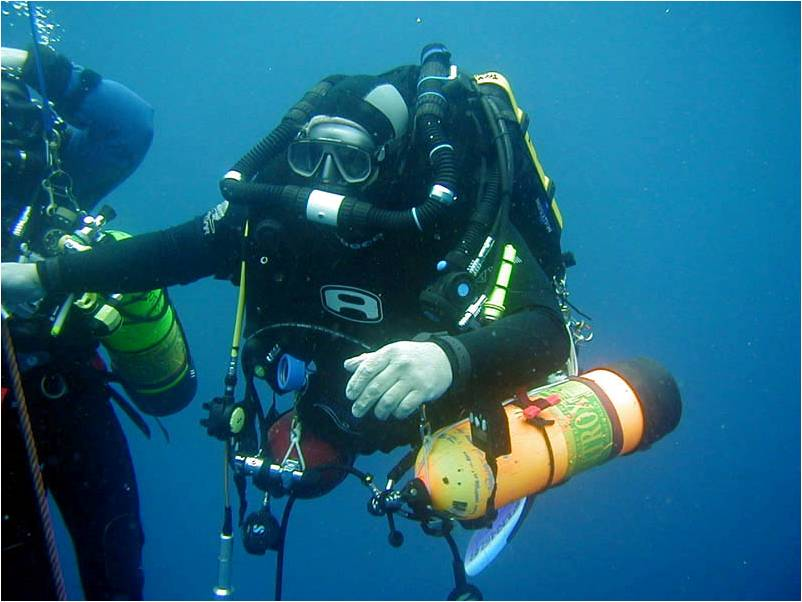
Diver returning from a 600 ft (183 m) dive

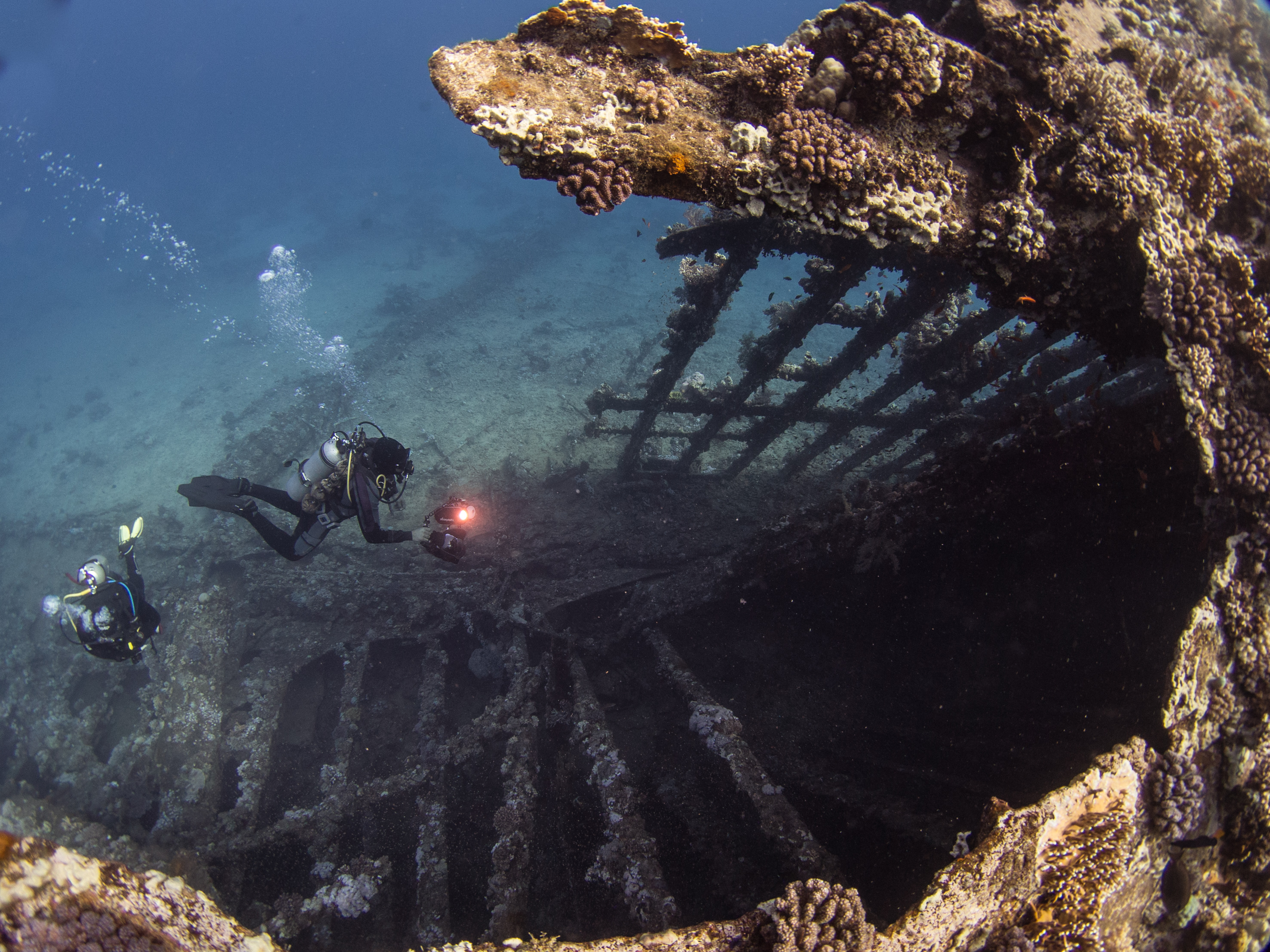
Divers at the wreck of the SS Carnatic

There are many recreational diving activities, and several equipment and environmental specialties which require skills additional to those provided by the entry level courses, These skills were originally developed by trial and error, but training programmes are offered by most diver training agencies for the convenience of the diver, and profit for the agency, or in the case of club oriented systems, for the overall benefit of the club community:

- Cave and cavern diving is underwater diving in water-filled caves. It may be done as an extreme sport, a way of exploring flooded caves for scientific investigation, or for the search for and recovery of divers lost as a result of one of these activities. The equipment used varies depending on the circumstances, but almost all cave diving is done using scuba equipment, often in specialised configurations with redundancies. Recreational cave diving is generally considered to be a type of technical diving due to the lack of a free surface during large parts of the dive, and often involves planned decompression stops. A distinction is made by recreational diver training agencies between cave diving and cavern diving, where cavern diving is deemed to be diving in those parts of a cave where the exit to open water can be seen by natural light. An arbitrary distance limit to the open water surface may also be specified.
- Muck diving gets its name from the sediment that lies on the bottom at many dive sites - a frequently muddy or "mucky" environment. Other than muddy sediment, the muck dive substrate may consist of dead coral skeletons, garbage and natural detritus. The visibility is usually less than on the reef or wreck sites of the area. However, the sediment and detritus environment has a different ecology to the reef, and the "muck" substrate can be the habitat for unusual, exotic and juvenile organisms that are not found in the cleaner reef sites.
- Recreational diving is diving for the purpose of leisure and enjoyment, and usually refers to scuba diving for recreational purposes, where the diver is not constrained from making a direct near-vertical ascent to the surface at any point during the dive, and risk is considered low. The equipment used for recreational diving is mostly open circuit scuba, though semi closed and fully automated electronic closed circuit rebreathers may be included in the scope of recreational diving. Risk is managed by training the diver in a range of standardised procedures and skills appropriate to the equipment the diver chooses to use and the environment in which the diver plans to dive. Further experience and development of skills by practice will improve the diver's ability to dive safely. Specialty training is made available by the recreational diver training industry and diving clubs to increase the range of environments and venues the diver can enjoy at an acceptable level of risk. Reasons to dive and preferred diving activities may vary during the personal development of a recreational diver, and may depend on their psychological profile and their level of dedication to the activity. Most divers average less than eight dives per year, but some total several thousand dives over a few decades and continue diving into their 60s and 70s, occasionally older. Recreational divers may frequent local dive sites or dive as tourists at more distant venues known for desirable underwater environments.
- Scuba finswimming, officially named "Immersion finswimming with breathing apparatus", is underwater competitive swimming using mask, monofin and underwater breathing apparatus conducted in a swimming pool. While there are no requirements on how a breathing apparatus is carried, it cannot be exchanged or abandoned during a race.
- Technical diving is recreational scuba diving that exceeds the agency-specified limits of recreational diving for non-professional purposes. Technical diving may expose the diver to hazards beyond those normally associated with recreational diving, and to a greater risk of serious injury or death. The risk may be reduced by appropriate skills, knowledge and experience, and by using suitable equipment and procedures. The skills may be developed through appropriate specialised training and experience. The equipment often involves breathing gases other than air or standard nitrox mixtures, and multiple gas sources.
- Underwater citizen science is the scientific research and monitoring for projects for which members of the public collect, categorize, transcribe or analyze scientific data. It is an increasingly popular but underutilised collaboration between society and scientific research, in which members of the recreational scuba diving community actively participate in marine data acquisition and recording, largely by way of geolocated photographic observations collected during recreational dives, but also in more structured and long term experimental work.
- Underwater photography is the process of taking photographs while under water. It is usually done while scuba diving, but can also be done while diving on surface supply, or freediving. Underwater photography can be categorised as an art form and a method for recording data. Successful underwater imaging is usually done with specialized equipment and techniques, and it offers unusual and rare photographic opportunities and subjects.
- Underwater orienteering is a competitive underwater sport that uses recreational open circuit scuba equipment, fins, a compass and a counter meter to measure the distance covered. The competition consists of a set of individual and team events conducted in both sheltered and open water testing the competitors' speed and accuracy in underwater navigation around accurately surveyed courses marked by buoys.
- Underwater videography is the branch of electronic underwater photography concerned with capturing underwater moving images as a recreational diving, scientific, commercial, documentary, or filmmaking activity.
- Wreck diving is recreational diving where the wreckage of ships, aircraft and other artificial structures are explored. Although most wreck dive sites are at shipwrecks, there is an increasing trend to scuttle retired ships to create artificial reef sites. The recreation of wreck diving makes no distinction as to how the vessel ended up on the bottom. Some wreck diving involves penetration of the wreckage, making a direct ascent to the surface impossible for a part of the dive.

=== Freediving activities ===
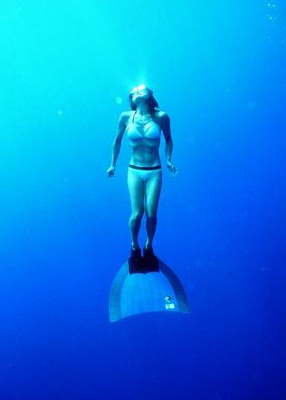
Freediver with monofin, ascending

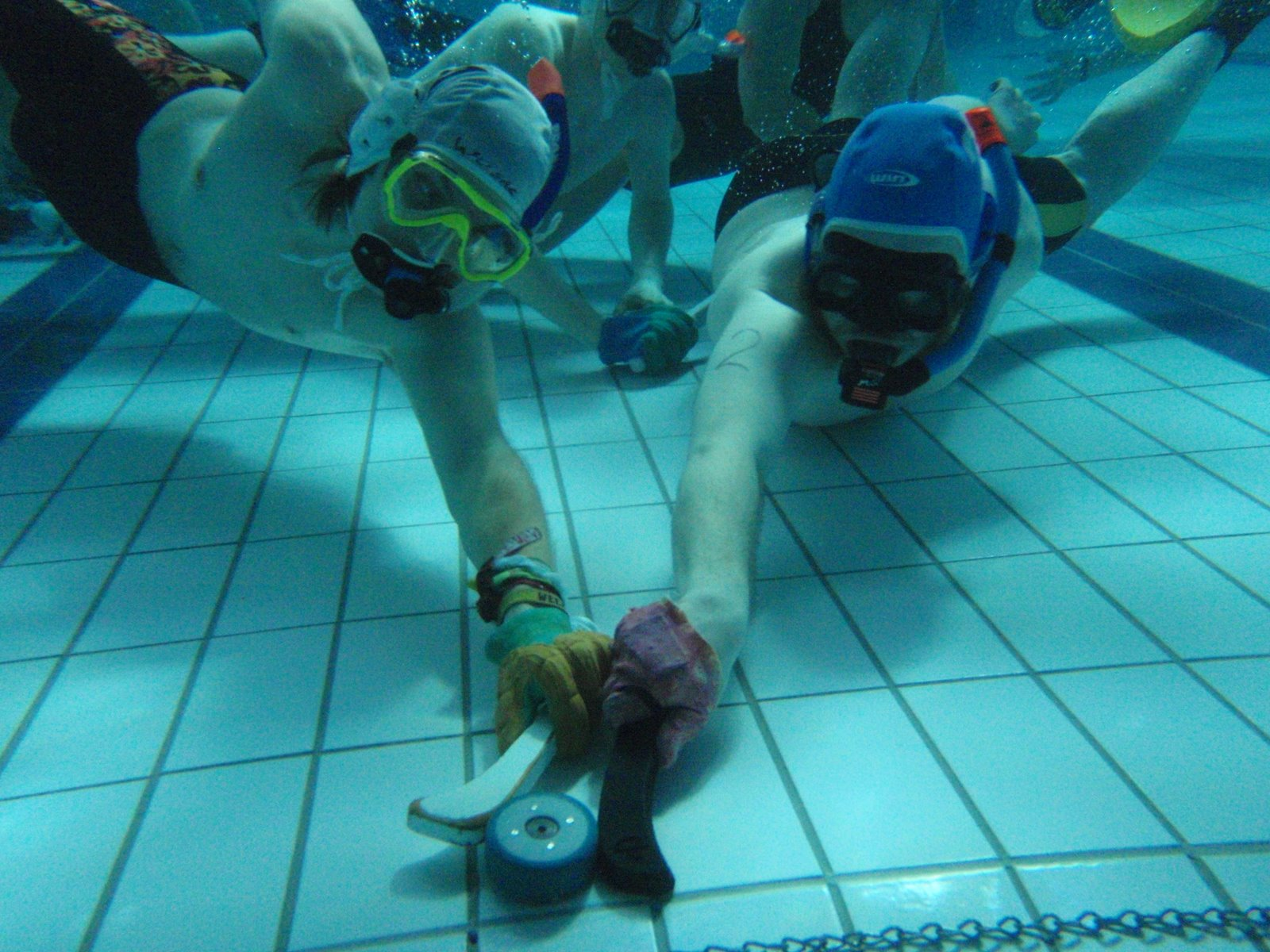
Two players competing for the puck in a game of underwater hockey

Freediving is a form of underwater diving that relies on breath-holding until resurfacing rather than the use of breathing apparatus such as scuba gear. Besides the limits of breath-hold, immersion in water and exposure to high ambient pressure also have physiological effects that limit the depths and duration possible in freediving. Examples of freediving activities are traditional fishing techniques, competitive and non-competitive freediving, competitive and non-competitive spearfishing and freediving photography, synchronised swimming, underwater football, underwater rugby, underwater hockey, underwater target shooting and snorkeling. There are also a range of "competitive apnea" disciplines; in which competitors attempt to attain great depths, times, or distances on a single breath:

- Aquathlon, also known as underwater wrestling, is an underwater sport, where two competitors wearing masks and fins wrestle underwater in an attempt to remove a ribbon from each other's ankle band to win the bout. The "combat" takes place in a 5-metre (16 ft) square ring within a swimming pool, and is made up of three 30-second rounds, with a fourth round played in the event of a tie.
- Finswimming is an underwater competitive sport consisting of four techniques involving swimming with the use of fins, either on the water's surface using a snorkel and with either a monofins or bifins, or underwater with a monofin. Three of the disciplines are on breath-hold, and one on scuba. Events take place over distances similar to swimming competitions for both swimming pool and open water venues.
- Recreational hunting and gathering, including non-competitive spearfishing, usually for food.
- Competitive spearfishing is "the hunting and capture of fish underwater without the aid of artificial breathing devices, using gear that depends entirely on the physical strength of the competitor."
- Underwater football is a two-team underwater sport is played in a swimming pool with snorkeling equipment: (mask, snorkel, and fins). The goal of the game is to manoeuvre (by carrying and passing) a slightly negatively buoyant ball from one side of a pool to the other by players who are completely submerged.
- Underwater hockey (also known as Octopush in the United Kingdom) is a globally played limited-contact sport in which two teams compete to manoeuvre a puck across the bottom of a swimming pool into the opposing team's goal by propelling it with a hockey stick (or pusher). A key challenge of the game is that it is played on breath-hold.
- Underwater ice hockey is played upside-down underneath the ice on frozen pools or ponds. Participants wear diving masks, fins and wetsuits and use the underside of the frozen surface as the playing area for a buoyant puck. Competitors do not use breathing apparatus, and must surface for air as required.
- Underwater rugby is an underwater team sport. During a match two teams try to score a negatively buoyant ball (filled with saltwater) into the opponents' goal at the bottom of a swimming pool. It has little in common with rugby football except for the name.
- Underwater target shooting is combined underwater sport and shooting sport that tests a competitors' ability to accurately use a speargun in a set of individual and team events conducted in a swimming pool using freediving or Apnoea technique.

== Training and skills development ==
The skills of underwater diving include some skills which are only needed in an emergency. These skills should be exercised sufficiently to ensure that if the emergency occurs, the diver is able to deal with it promptly and effectively. Skills practice can be done as part of a dive for other purposes, or in a dive dedicated to maintaining and developing the skills. Divers who do not dive sufficiently often to maintain basic skills may need to do refresher courses or checkout dives when returning to active diving. New skills may require dedicated practice to bring them up to a reliable standard.

== Familiarisation with equipment ==
New equipment or a modification to equipment configuration may affect the diver's ability to operate the equipment or respond effectively to a problem. A common example is checking buoyancy control with a new diving suit, buoyancy compensator, cylinder configuration, or weighting system, or an unfamiliar model of rebreather. Buoyancy testing is done with the cylinders nearly empty, to ensure that the diver can maintain neutral buoyancy at the end of a dive during decompression, even if contingency use has depleted the reserve gas supplies. In many cases, testing new equipment does not require a special dive, as any problems will be noticed immediately, and either fixed or the dive can be safely aborted.

== Response to an emergency ==
Both foreseeable and not reasonably foreseeable emergencies can occur during a dive. Dealing with them in some way is necessary, and may involve the diver in self-rescue, the buddy, in assistance to the other buddy, or the safety diver or stand-by diver in assistance to the diver or divers in difficulty. Response to an emergency happening to someone else may lead to public safety diving team involvement. Special circumstances like flooded cave rescues, entrapment in capsized vessels, and rescues from other disasters may involve larger groups.

== Emergency recompression ==
In-water recompression (IWR) is the emergency treatment of decompression sickness (DCS) by returning the diver underwater to help the gas bubbles in the tissues, which are causing the symptoms, to resolve. It is a procedure that exposes the diver to significant risk which should be compared with the risk associated with the other available options. Some authorities recommend that it is only to be used when the time to travel to the nearest recompression chamber is too long to save the victim's life, others take a more pragmatic approach, and accept that in some circumstances IWR is the best available option. The risks may not be justified for case of mild symptoms likely to resolve spontaneously, or for cases where the diver is likely to be unsafe in the water, but in-water recompression may be justified in cases where severe outcomes are likely, if conducted by a competent and suitably equipped team.

== Classification of underwater diving activities by occupational field ==
This is a table of underwater diving activities classified by occupational field and the diving modes usually associated with them. The mode may be dictated by the regulations or codes of practice governing the field of occupation.

Diving activity name or description	Occupational classification	Diving modes generally used
aquarium maintenance in large public aquariums	commercial, scientific	Scuba, SSDE
boat and ship inspection, cleaning and maintenance	commercial, naval	SSDE, occasionally scuba
cave diving	technical, recreational, scientific	Scuba, occasionally SSDE
civil engineering in harbours, water supply, and drainage systems	commercial	Almost exclusively SSDE
offshore construction and maintenance in the crude oil and other industry	commercial	SSDE, ROV, occasionally atmospheric suit
demolition and salvage of shipwrecks	commercial, naval	SSDE, sometimes scuba, atmospheric suit or ROV
professional diver training	professional	SSDE or scuba as appropriate
recreational diver training	professional, recreational	Scuba, breathhold
fish farm and other aquaculture maintenance	commercial	Scuba, SSDE
fishing/gathering, e.g. for abalones, crabs, lobsters, pearls, scallops, sea crayfish, sponges	commercial, recreational	Scuba, SSDE, breathhold
frogman, manned torpedo	military	Scuba
harbour clearance and maintenance	commercial, military	Almost exclusively SSDE
media diving: making television programs, underwater videography, underwater photography etc.	professional, recreational	Scuba, ROV, occasionally SSDE
mine clearance and bomb disposal, disposing of unexploded ordnance	military, naval	Scuba, ROV, occasionally SSDE
pleasure, leisure, sport	recreational	Scuba, breathhold, occasionally SSDE (Snuba)
policing/security: diving to investigate or arrest unauthorized divers	police diving, military, naval	Scuba
search and recovery diving	commercial, public safety, police diving, military	Scuba, SSDE, ROV
search and rescue diving	police, naval, public service	Scuba, occasionally SSDE
spear fishing	recreational(sometimes competitive), occasionally professional,	Breathhold
stealthy infiltration	military	Scuba
surveys and mapping	scientific, recreational	Scuba, SSDE
scientific diving (marine biology, oceanography, hydrology, geology, palaeontology, diving physiology and medicine	scientific	Scuba, occasionally SSDE, atmospheric suit, ROV, AUV
underwater archaeology (shipwrecks; harbors, and buildings)	scientific, recreational	Scuba, SSDE, ROV, occasionally atmospheric suit
underwater inspections and surveys	commercial, military	SSDE, sometimes scuba, ROV
underwater mineral extraction (gold, diamonds, oil)	commercial	SSDE, including airline (Hookah) and saturation, ROV
competitive underwater sport, including underwater hockey, aquathlon, scuba orienteering, underwater rugby and others	recreational	Snorkel, breathhold and scuba
underwater tour guiding	professional, recreational	Scuba
underwater tourism	recreational	Scuba, occasionally Snuba
underwater welding	commercial	Almost exclusively SSDE
