= Commercial diving =

Professional diving on industrial projects

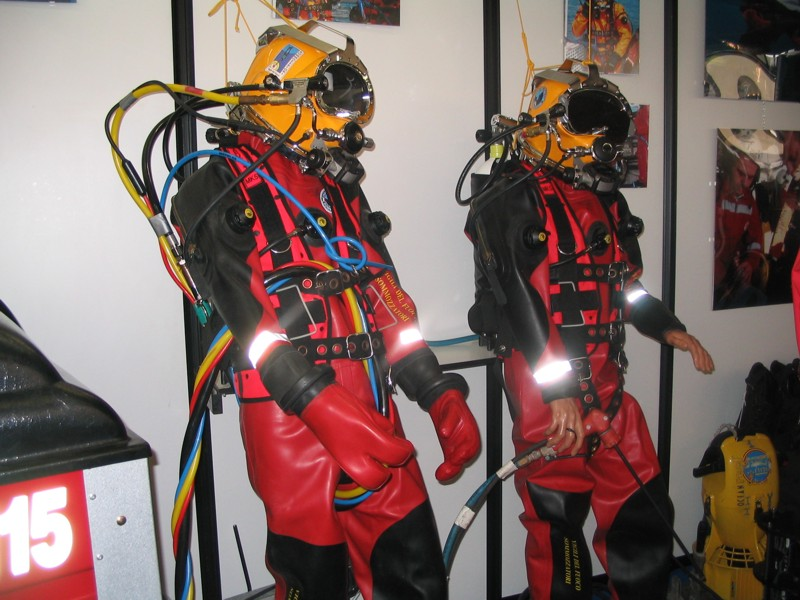
Surface supplied commercial diving equipment on display at a trade show

Commercial diving may be considered an application of professional diving where the diver engages in underwater work for industrial, construction, engineering, maintenance or other commercial purposes which are similar to work done out of the water, and where the diving is usually secondary to the work.

In some legislation, commercial diving is defined as any diving done by an employee as part of their job, and for legal purposes this may include scientific, public safety, media, and military diving. That is similar to the definition for professional diving, but in those cases the difference is in the status of the diver within the organisation of the diving contractor. This distinction may not exist in other jurisdictions. In South Africa, any person who dives under the control and instructions of another person within the scope of the Occupational Health and Safety Act, 1993, is within the scope of the Diving Regulations, 2009.

== Applications of commercial diving ==
=== Offshore diving ===
Offshore diving is a well known branch of commercial diving, with divers working in support of the exploration and production sector of the oil and gas industry in places such as the Gulf of Mexico in the United States, the North Sea in the United Kingdom, and Norway and along the coast of Brazil. The work in this area of the industry includes maintenance of oil platforms and the building of underwater structures used in the production process.

Equipment used for offshore diving tends to be surface supplied equipment but this does vary depending on the nature of the work and location. For instance Gulf of Mexico-based divers may use wetsuits whereas North Sea divers need drysuits or even hot water suits due to the temperature of the water.

=== Civil engineering diving ===
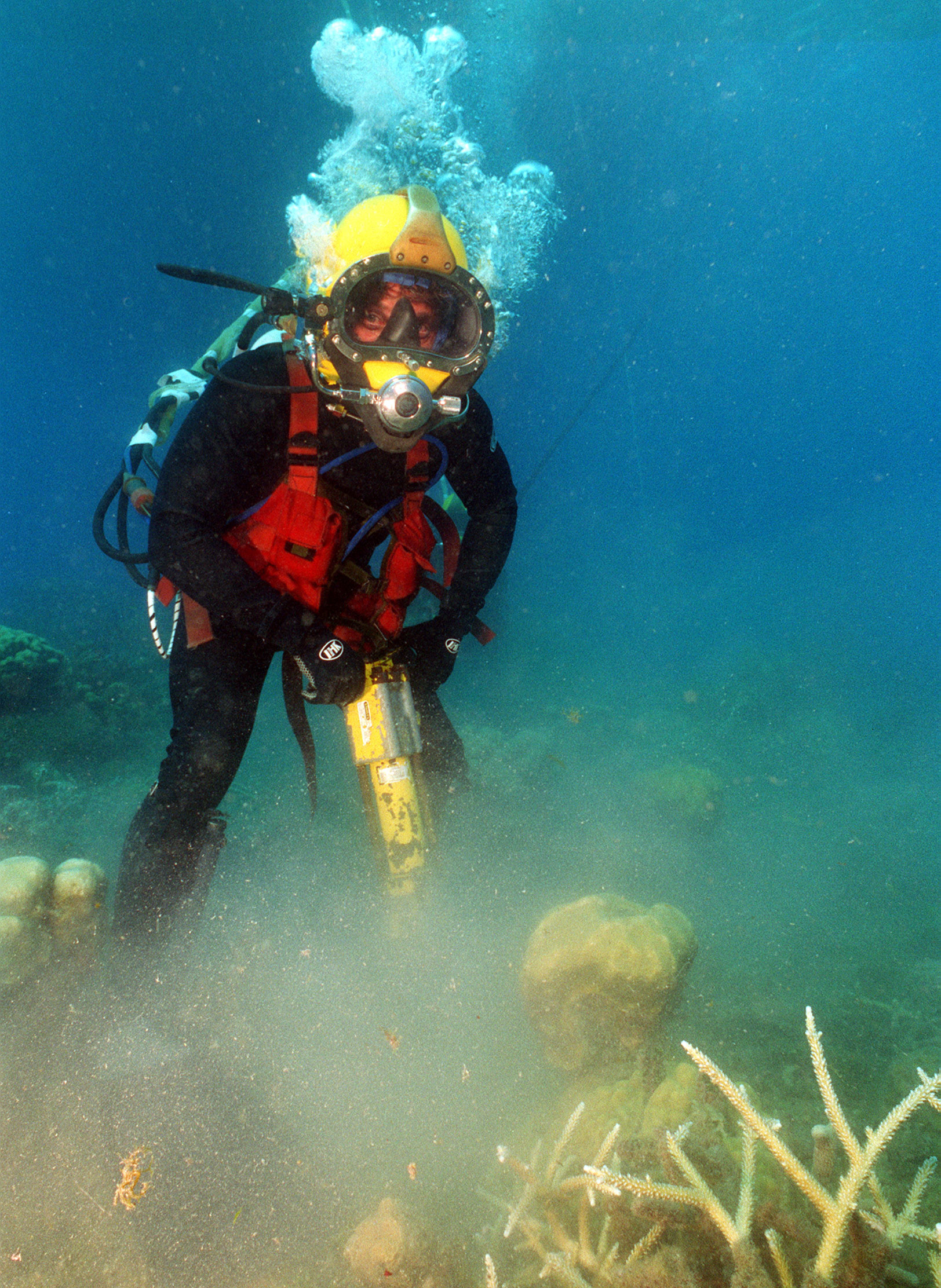
Inshore diving commonly includes underwater work in support of construction projects

Civil engineering works are one of the major applications of inshore and inland coastal diving projects. Much of the work is either underwater inspection or engineering construction or repair work. The types of dive sites involved is varied, and divers can be found working in harbours and lakes, on hydroelectric dams, in rivers and around bridges and pontoons, with a large amount of this work being done in freshwater. Divers may be required to inspect and repair outfalls with penetrations exceeding 600 feet (180 m), which require special safety precautions.

The equipment used does depend on the nature of the work and location, but normally surface oriented surface-supplied diving equipment is used. Saturation diving may be used for major projects in deep water, and scuba may occasionally be used for inspections or light work where the regulations or code of practice permit.

==== Construction and repair ====
Construction:

Concrete work:

- Clearing and preparation. Dredging, airlifting, waterjetting, In-water surface cleaning. Shuttering and formwork, bagwork. Reinforcement. Underwater concrete placement - Tremie, pumped concrete, skip placement, toggle bags, grouted aggregate.
- Concrete repair: Grouting

Fixing bolts: Drilling and core drilling

Pipe installation (Outfalls) Pipeline support and protection, Mattresses (ballast for stabilising pipelines),

==== Inspection and non-destructive testing ====
Inspection of underwater structures, installations, and sites is a common diving activity, applicable to planning, installation, and maintenance phases, but the required skills are often specific to the application. Much use is made of video and still photographic evidence, and live video to allow direction of the inspection work by the supervisor and topside specialists. Inspections may also involve surface preparation, often by cleaning, and non-destructive testing. Tactile inspection may be appropriate where visibility is poor.

=== Hazmat diving ===
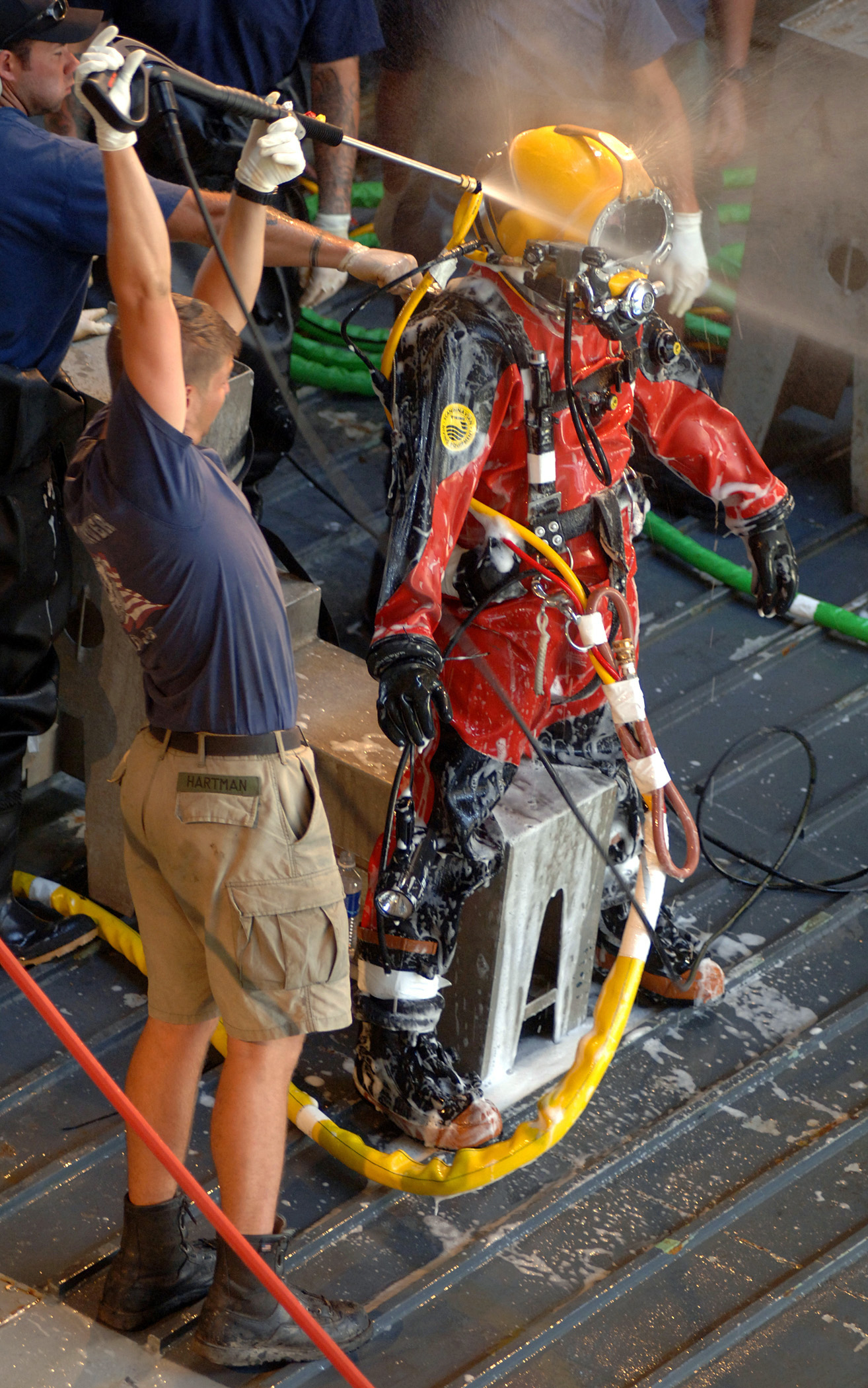
US Navy Diver being decontaminated after a dive. If the contamination was serious, the decontamination team would have been wearing hazmat gear

HAZMAT diving is one of the most dangerous branches of the commercial diving industry, employing highly skilled and experienced staff.

Typical work involves diving into raw sewage or dangerous chemicals, such as paper pulp, liquid cement, or oil sludge. This leads to special requirements:

- The divers may need to be vaccinated against diseases such as hepatitis and tetanus.
- Suitable equipment and competent personnel are required for decontamination of the diver and diving equipment after a dive.
- Emergency procedures appropriate to the specific hazmat environment must be planned and equipment and personnel in place to safely recover the diver if something goes wrong.
- Personnel must be monitored after exposure for possible long term effects.

The tasks a diver may be required to do in a contaminated environment include:

- Essential maintenance of underwater valves and sluice gates.
- Repairing damaged pipelines.
- Pollution control work to contain, control and clean up after a pollution incident.
- Sampling activities, such as those performed by United States Environmental Protection Agency. units specializing in polluted water diving, and the Environmental Response Team dive units.
- Diving in landfill sites to maintain the pumping equipment, vital in preventing landfill sites from filling up with rainwater and contaminating the water table.
- Maintenance and repair work inside functioning sewers, sewage treatment works, or working in septic tanks.
- Maintenance and repair work in nuclear plant.
- Miscellaneous repairs and finding lost objects.
- Finding and recovering corpses after crimes, accidents and disasters. - This work is usually done by police divers and public safety divers, though military divers may be called in to assist for major incidents.

Hazmat diving may also be encountered in public safety diving and military diving.

=== Potable water diving ===
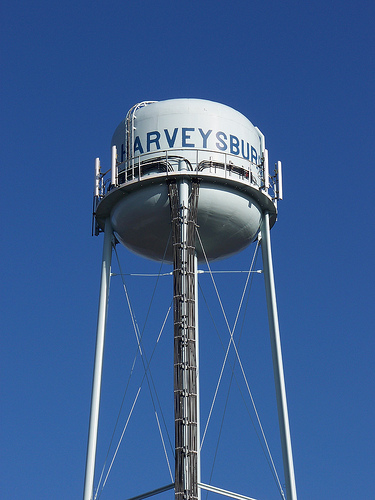
Inspection of the interior of a municipal water tower requires specialized training and safety equipment.

Potable water diving is diving in a tank for potable water. This is usually done for inspection and cleaning tasks. A person who is trained to do this work may be described as a potable water diver. The risks to the diver associated with potable water diving are related to the access, confined spaces and outlets for the water. The risk of contamination of the water is managed by isolating the diver in a clean dry-suit and helmet or full-face mask which are decontaminated before the dive.

=== Salvage diving ===
Salvage diving is the diving work associated with the recovery of all or part of ships, their cargoes, aircraft, and other vehicles and structures which have sunk or fallen into water. In the case of ships it may also refer to repair work done to make an abandoned or distressed but still floating vessel more suitable for towing or propulsion under its own power.

Most salvage diving is commercial work, or military work, depending on the diving contractor and the purpose for the salvage operation, Clearance diving, the removal of obstructions and hazards to navigation, is closely related to salvage diving, but has a different purpose, in that the objects to be removed are not intended to be recovered, just removed or reduced to a condition where they no longer constitute a hazard. Many of the techniques and procedures used in clearance diving are also used in salvage work.

=== Ships husbandry diving ===
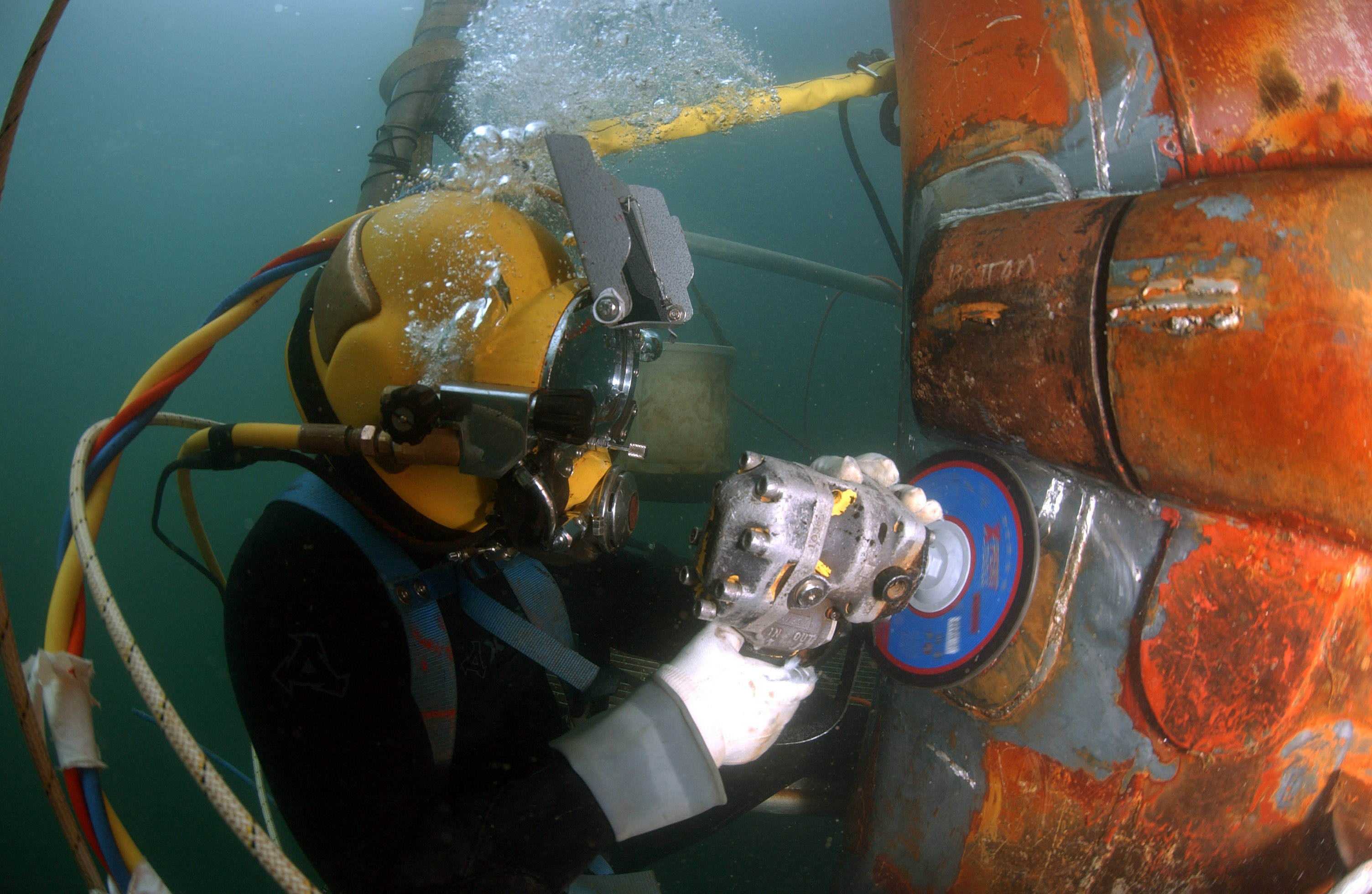
A diver at work on hull maintenance

Ships husbandry is the maintenance, cleaning, and general upkeep of the hull, rigging, and equipment of a ship, and may also refer to aspects of maintenance which are not specifically covered by the technical departments.

Underwater ship husbandry includes:

- Underwater hull cleaning to remove fouling organisms which increase drag, and therefore reduce top speed and increase fuel consumption. Such cleaning may be of the entire hull or parts thereof, particularly propellers, shafts and thrusters.
- Non-destructive testing and inspection including fouling surveys, inspection of known or suspected damage to structure, equipment or coatings, and inspection of repairs.
- Underwater repair of structure, appendages, and equipment, and small areas of paintwork.

== Equipment ==
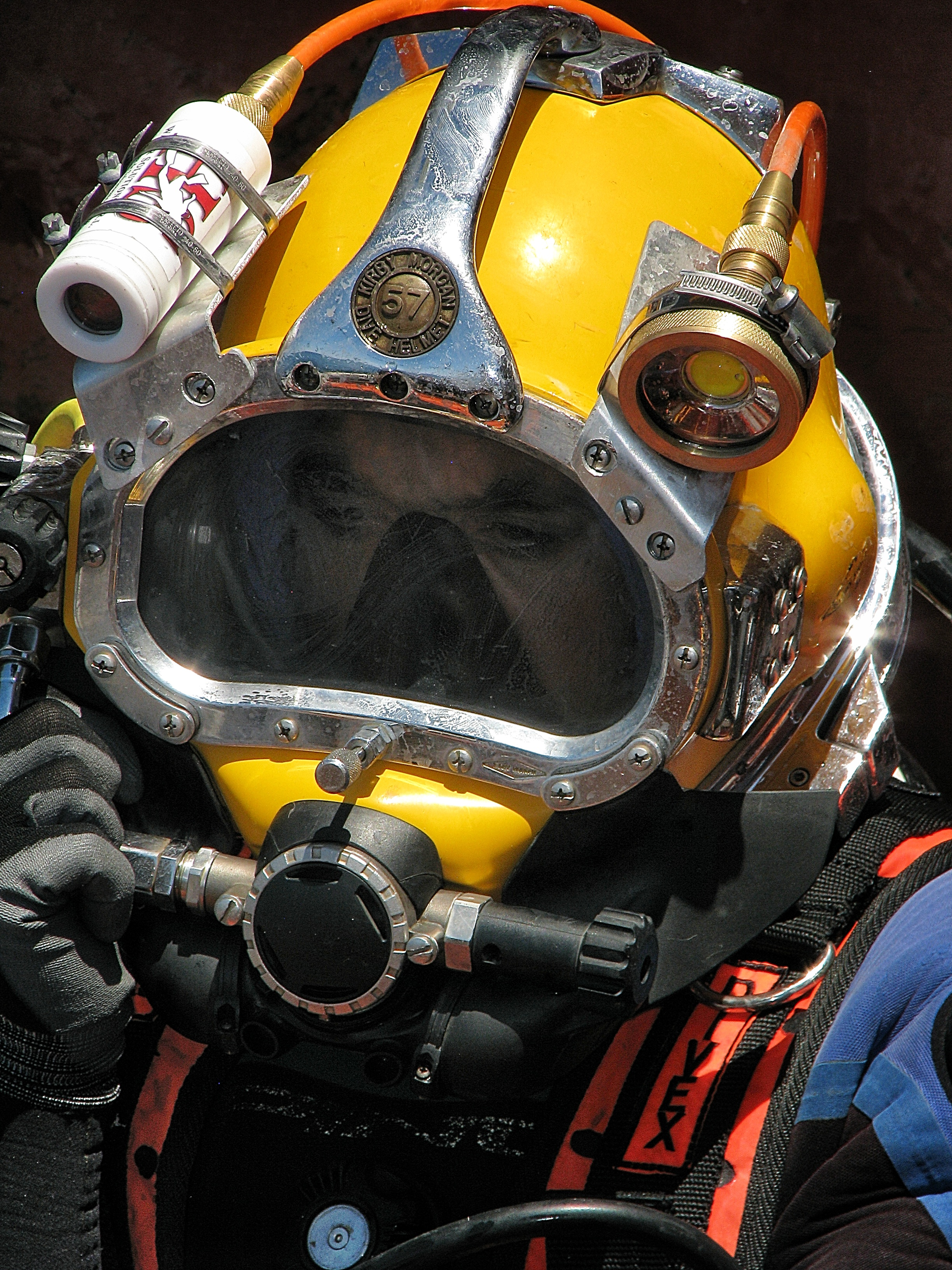
Diver using Kirby Morgan 57 diving helmet fitted with underwater camera and light

=== Diving suit ===
Depending on the water temperature, depth and duration of the planned dive, the diver will either use a wetsuit, dry suit or hot water suit. A wetsuit provides thermal insulation by layers of foam neoprene but the diver gets wet. Hot water diving suits are similar to a wetsuit but are flooded with warm water from a surface water heater that is then pumped to the diver via an umbilical. A dry suit is another method of protection, operating by keeping the diver dry under the suit, and relies on either the suit material or the air trapped in thermal undergarments to insulate the diver, and also provides better isolation from environmental contamination. Certain applications require a specific type of dive suit; long dives into deep, cold water normally require a hot water suit or dry suit, whilst diving into potentially contaminated environments requires a dry suit, dry hood, and dry gloves at a minimum, thereby keeping the diver completely isolated from the diving environment.

=== Breathing apparatus ===
A number of factors dictate the type of breathing apparatus used by the diver. Typical considerations include the length of the dive, water contamination, space constraints and vehicle access for support vehicles. Commercial divers will rarely use scuba equipment for occupational health and safety reasons.

==== Scuba diving ====
Open circuit scuba equipment is occasionally used by commercial divers working on sites where surface supplied equipment is unsuitable, such as around raised structures like a water tower, or in remote locations where it is necessary to carry equipment to the dive site. Normally, for comfort and for practicality, a full face mask such as those manufactured by Kirby Morgan will be used to allow torches and video cameras to be mounted onto the mask. The benefit of full-face masks is that they are considered safer, as they protect the airway, and can normally be used with surface supplied equipment as well as scuba, reducing the need for contractor to have two different sets of equipment and the spares to service them.

==== Surface-supplied diving ====
This is the most common type of equipment used in professional diving, and the one most recognised by the public. Surface-supplied equipment can be used with full face masks or diving helmets, which are normally fitted with diver to surface communication equipment, and often with light sources and video equipment. The decision between wearing a full-face mask or a full diving helmet comes down to job requirements and personal preference, however the impact protection and warmth offered by a full diving helmet makes it popular for underwater construction sites and cold water work.

Breathing gas for the diver is piped down from the surface, through a long, flexible hose, bundled with other services and called an diver's umbilical. In addition to breathing gas, the umbilical will have additional hoses and cables for such things as communications equipment, a pneumofathometer for measuring depth, or hot water should the diver be using a hot water suit. The umbilical must be strong enough to support the diver's weight, with a significant safety margin, and securely connected to the diver's harness, because it may be used by surface personnel to pull the diver out of the water. Breathing gas is may be supplied from either high pressure storage cylinders or through a gas compressor. An emergency gas supply is carried by the diver.

==== Saturation diving ====
If the diver is to work at fairly constant depths for periods which would require long periods for decompression, the diver may temporarily live in a pressurised surface habitat called a saturation system, and be transported under pressure in a closed bell to and from the underwater workplace. The various chambers, including the diving bell to bring the divers to their work site, are called Pressure vessel for human occupancy.This type of diving is known as saturation diving. The same techniques for supplying breathing gas are used as in surface oriented surface-supplied diving, with the diving bell receiving breathing gas and other essential services from the surface. If diving at extreme depths, helium-based breathing gas mixtures are used to prevent nitrogen narcosis and oxygen toxicity which would otherwise occur due to the high ambient pressure. The diver is decompressed only once, at the end of the job, which saves time and reduces risk of decompression injury.

== Training and registration ==
In most jurisdictions the diving training and certification is the same for all branches of commercial diving, but specialist training may be needed for specific work skills associated with the application.

Diver training is the set of processes through which a person learns the necessary and desirable skills to safely dive underwater within the scope of the diver training standard relevant to the specific training programme. Most diver training follows procedures and schedules laid down in the associated training standard, in a formal training programme, and includes relevant foundational knowledge of the underlying theory, including some basic physics, physiology and environmental information, practical skills training in the selection and safe use of the associated equipment in the specified underwater environment, and assessment of the required skills and knowledge deemed necessary by the certification agency to allow the newly certified diver to dive within the specified range of conditions at an acceptable level of risk. Recognition of prior learning is allowed in some training standards.

Diver training is closely associated with diver certification or registration, the process of application for and issue of formal recognition of competence by a certification agency or registration authority. Commercial diver certification is generally in terms of a diver training standard published by a national government organisation or department, or an international organisation of which such national bodies are members. Training standards specify the mode of diving, equipment and scope of operations for divers registered in terms of that standard. International recognition of professional diver certification may require registration through a national government agency or an agency appointed by a national government for this purpose.

Work skills specific to the underwater environment may be included in diver trailing programmes, but are also often provided independently, either as job training for a specific operation, or as generic training by specialists in the fields.

== Demographics ==
US Bureau of Labor occupational employment statistics in May 2019 for commercial divers, excluding athletes and sports competitors, law enforcement personnel, and hunting and fishing workers, estimates national employment of 3,420 employees, with a mean annual wage of $67,100 and mean hourly pay rate of $32.26 for this occupation. Actual rates can vary from about half to about twice these figures. Employment is concentrated in coastal states. These figures are slightly higher than for 2017.

== International commercial diving co-ordination and regulatory organisations ==
=== Association of Commercial Diving Educators ===
The Association of Commercial Diving Educators, Inc. (ACDE) is a section 501 (c) (3) organization established in 1979 to communicate between industry and schools which provide commercial diver training. Membership includes US public and private educational organisations.

Goals:

- To promote consistency and quality of commercial diver training amongst member schools.
- To provide oversight and quality assurance of the ANSI/ACDE-01-2015 National Training Standard.
- To communicate and participate with local, state and federal authorities, business, commerce and industry in the development and maintenance of high standards and sound policies in the field of diving education.
- To provide academic and training expertise to government training agencies and commercial diving industries and their representative organizations.

Member Schools

- The Ocean Corporation
- Divers Academy International
- International Diving Institute
- Commercial Diving Academy
- Louisiana Technical College

The ANSI/ACDE-01-2015 Minimum Standard for Commercial Diver Training was revised and approved by ANSI in 2015.

=== Association of Diving Contractors International ===
The Association of Diving Contractors International (ADCI) is a non-profit organization which promotes standards and issues certifications for commercial diving skills. ADCI publishes Consensus Standards for Commercial Diving Operations, which defines qualifications for its diving certifications and safety procedures in underwater activities.

=== European Diving Technology Committee ===
The European Diving Technology Committee (EDTC) is tasked with promoting good standards for diving within Europe and where practicable, coordinating differing standards. As part of this work they publish high level minimum competence standards for inshore and offshore diving industry personnel as guidance for member states to encourage harmonisation of standards and facilitate international recognition of commercial diver qualifications.

=== International Marine Contractors Association ===
The International Marine Contractors Association (IMCA) is the international trade association representing offshore, marine, and underwater engineering companies. Contractors, suppliers, training establishments, personnel agencies and non-voting corresponding organisations (oil companies, governmental and regulatory bodies) can become members in one or more of the four divisions (Diving, Marine, Offshore Survey, Remote Systems & ROV).

=== International Diving Regulators and Certifiers Forum ===
The International Diving Regulators and Certifiers Forum (IDRCF) confirmed its principals and purpose at their meeting in London in September 2009. The statement of principals and purpose states “The forum has agreed to work together towards mutual recognition to identify and implement best practice in diver training and assessment with the objective of harmonising cross-border diver training outside Europe.” Members of the IDRCF include ADAS (Australia), DCBC (Canada), HSE (UK), PSA (Norway), and the Secretariat General to the Sea Progress Committee (France).

=== International Diving Schools Association ===
IThe International Diving Schools Association (DSA) was formed in 1982 with the primary purpose of developing common international standards for commercial diver training.

The Association is concerned with offshore, inshore and inland commercial diving and some specialist non-diving qualifications such as diving supervisors, diving medical technicians and life support technicians. It has published international diver training standards based on the consensus opinion of members which provide a basic standard of comparison for commercial diver training standards, with the stated intention of:-

- Improving safety
- Providing contractors with a direct input to the diver training syllabus
- Enabling contractors to bid across national borders on a more even playing field
- Improving diver quality
- Providing divers with greater job opportunities

IDSA provides a Table of Equivalence of various national commercial diver training standards.

== Safety record ==
Commercial diving remains a relatively dangerous occupation, but the rate of fatal accidents has decreased over the years.

Statistics of fatal commercial diving accidents in the UK between 1996 and 2010 compiled by the HSE UK

Fatal accidents per 100,000 workers per year
All workers in UK	0.5
Service sector	0.3
Construction	2
Extractive industries	4
Agriculture	8
Offshore diving	20 to 30
Inshore diving	30 to 60
