= Divers Academy International =

Technical educational institution in New Jersey

Divers Academy International is a private, for-profit technical educational institution in New Jersey that offers training in commercial diving and underwater welding.

== History ==
Divers Academy was founded in 1977 by Captain William M. Brown, a Korean War veteran, to meet the high demand for commercial divers in the offshore oil industry, inland harbors, and rivers. In 2006, the school was purchased by William Brown's daughter, Tamara Brown, who took over as president and CEO. In early 2022, she pled guilty to a charge of wire fraud after the U.S. Department of Justice accused her of "fraudulently obtaining funding from the U.S. Department of Education (DOE) and the U.S. Department of Veterans Affairs (VA) for the school and its students." The prosecutors also alleged that she falsified materials submitted to the school's accreditor in 2012.

Originally named Divers Academy of the Eastern Seaboard, in 2001 the school was renamed Divers Academy International. As the commercial dive industry has evolved, Divers Academy has expanded the curriculum, certifications, facilities, technology, and faculty to meet current industry needs.

== Campus ==
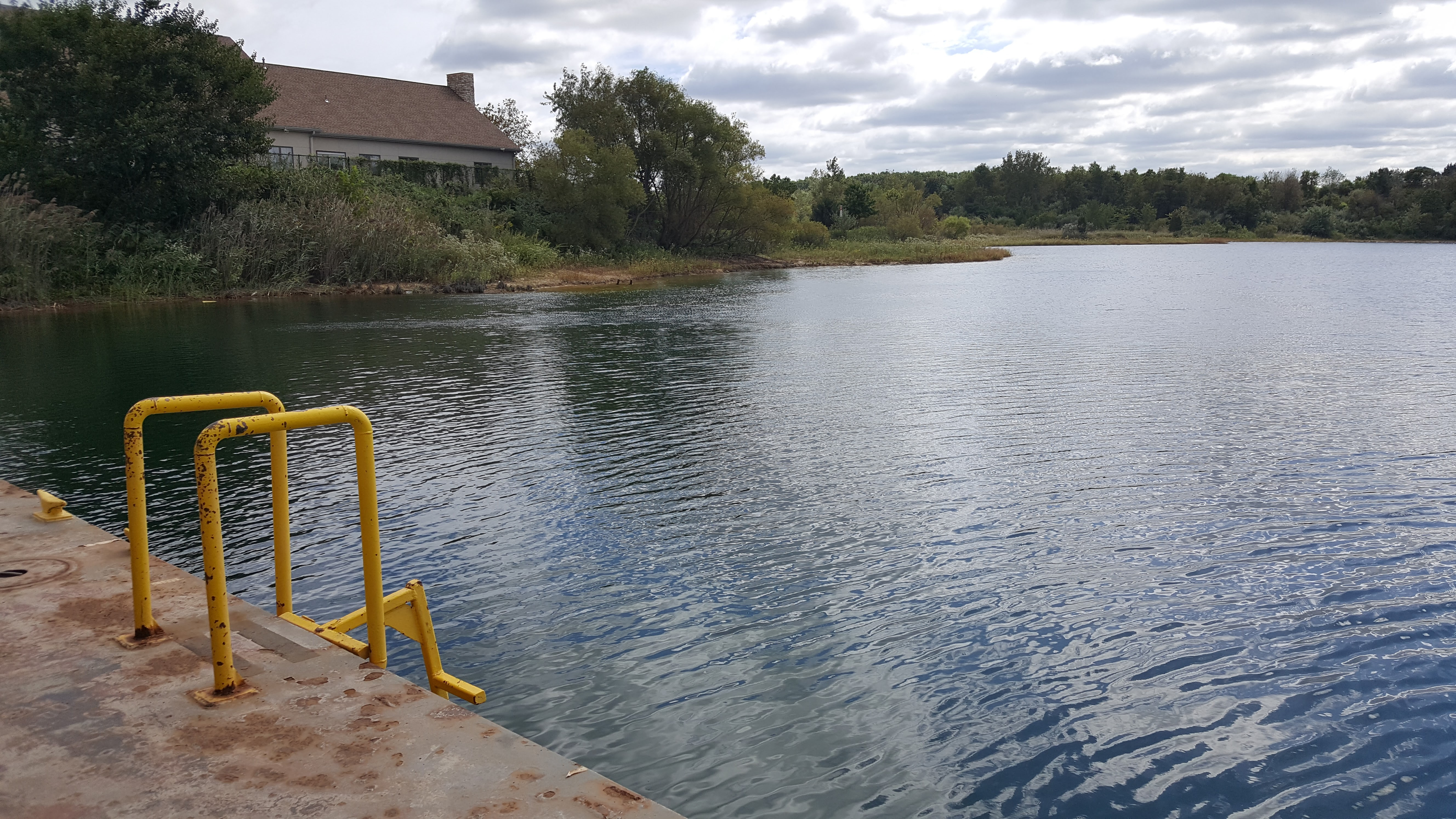
Diving waters

Divers Academy is currently based in Erial, New Jersey. It moved from its original campus in Camden, New Jersey to a custom-designed facility in Erial in 2006. The school campus includes a 32-acre 60-foot deep commercial dive training quarry, hyperbaric chamber, Lincoln welding facilities and fully equipped classrooms. In 2013 Divers Academy expanded, adding a custom mixed gas deep dive training facility in Allentown, Pennsylvania. The 50-acre, 300 foot deep dive quarry is the deepest dive training quarry in the US, and is used exclusively for mixed gas deep dive training.

== Accreditation ==
Divers Academy is accredited by the Accrediting Commission for Career Schools and Colleges. It is accredited or affiliated with technical and diving organizations such as the Association of Commercial Diving Educators (ACDE).
