= Ships husbandry =

Maintenance and upkeep of ships

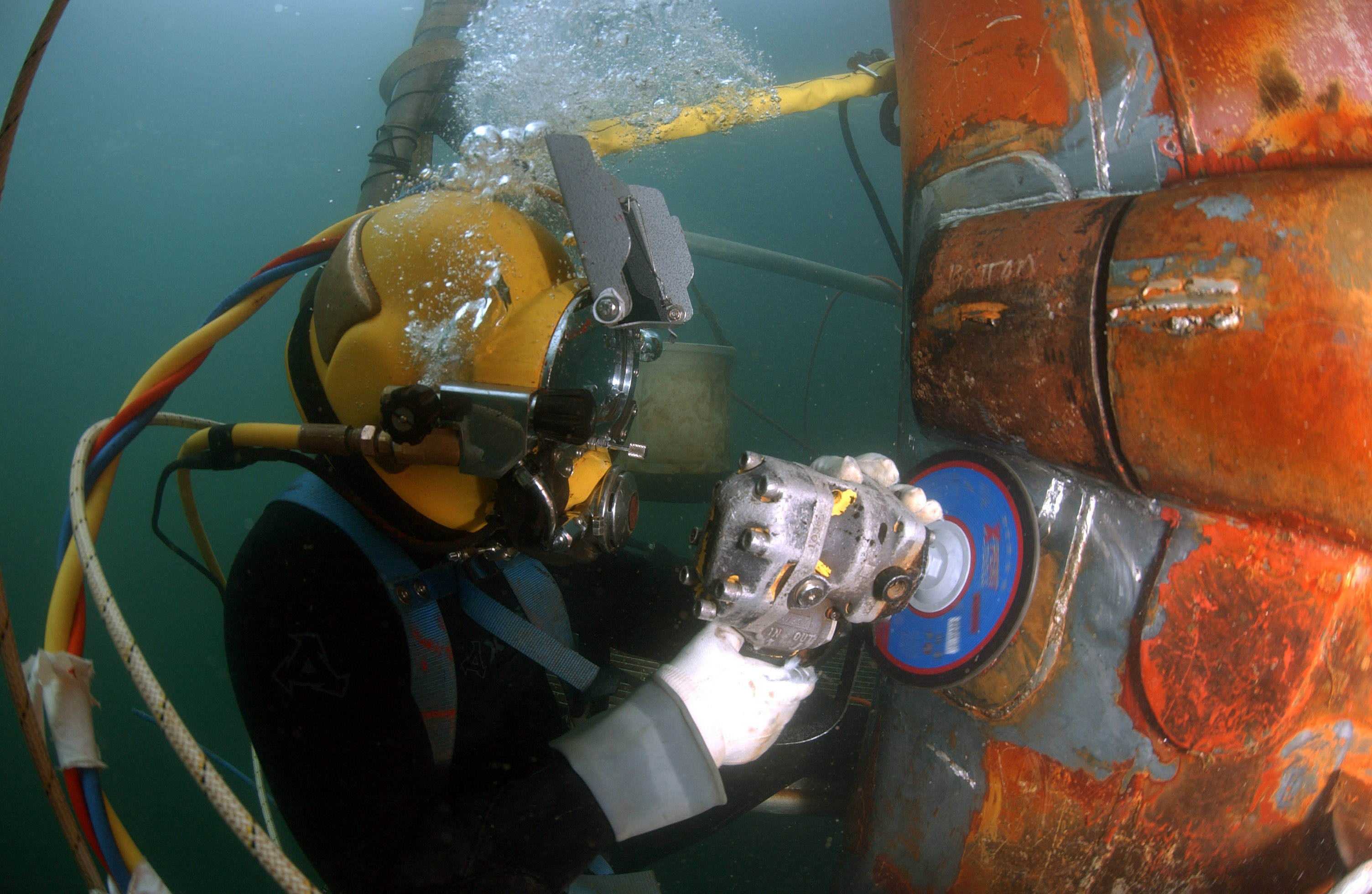
A diver at work on hull maintenance

Ships husbandry or ship husbandry is all aspects of maintenance, cleaning, and general upkeep of the hull, rigging, and equipment of a ship. It may also be used to refer to aspects of maintenance which are not specifically covered by the technical departments. The term is used in both naval and merchant shipping, but naval vessel husbandry may also be used for specific reference to naval vessels.

== Ships husbandry diving ==
Underwater ships husbandry can be financially advantageous when it eliminates the need for dry-dock repairs or extends the interval between dry-dockings, and reduces the time a ship is required to stay in dry-dock.

Underwater ship husbandry includes the following operations, usually done by commercial divers, though some can be done by ROVs or robotic machinery:

- Underwater hull cleaning to remove fouling organisms which increase drag, and therefore reduce top speed and increase fuel consumption. Such cleaning may be of the entire hull or parts thereof, particularly propellers, shafts and thrusters. The underwater hull may be inspected prior to cleaning, and the amount of cleaning done may depend on the inspection results. Hull cleaning may be done by divers using hand held or self-propelled mechanical brushing equipment, water jets or scrapers.
- Non-destructive testing and inspection including fouling surveys, inspection of known or suspected damage to structure, equipment or coatings, and inspection of repairs. Several methods may be used, including visual inspection, video recording and magnetic particle testing.
- Underwater painting is done to repair paintwork after repairs, or where small areas of paint have been damaged or have worn out. Suitable paints are applied by the diver using brush or roller.
- Fiberglass repair, can be hull repair or propeller shaft protective coating repair. Repair of fibreglass shaft coating is generally done in a dry habitat mounted over the shaft, allowing access through the open bottom for the divers. The shaft is first cleaned before wrapping with a new layer of sheathing.
- Underwater welding is either done in a submerged dry habitat or wet. Better quality welds can be achieved in dry conditions as the cooling rate is reduced and there is less problem with hydrogen embrittlement. Weld surfaces are prepared by cleaning with scrapers, chipping hammers or hand-held brushes, and pneumatic or hydraulic grinding tools.
- Minor repairs to the rubber coating of sonar domes can be done by divers. This entails removal of damaged rubber, preparation of the surface and application of a rubber patch using a suitable adhesive.

=== Environmental impact ===
Several of the operations classified as ship husbandry will release some quantity of harmful material into the water, particularly hull cleaning operations which will release antifouling toxins. Underwater ship husbandry can cause an adverse environmental effect as significant amounts of copper and zinc are released by underwater hull scrubbing. Alien biofouling organisms may also be released during this process.

=== Diving under the hull ===
The underside of the hull is an overhead environment with no direct vertical access to the surface. As such it constitutes an entrapment hazard, particularly under large vessels where it may be too dark due to low natural light or turbid water to see the way to the side of the hull. The bottom of the largest ships is mostly flat and featureless, exacerbating the problem. Only surface-supplied diving is authorised for this work in most jurisdictions, as this not only secures the diver's breathing gas supply, but also provides a guideline to the exit point. The use of mechanised bottom scrubbing devices which are steered along the hull surface by a diver and scrub it with rotary brushes has been linked with high release of environmental toxins. There is also a hazard of crushing if the clearance is small and the tide range is large.
