= Underwater football =

Underwater team sport using snorkeling equipment and an American football

Underwater Football
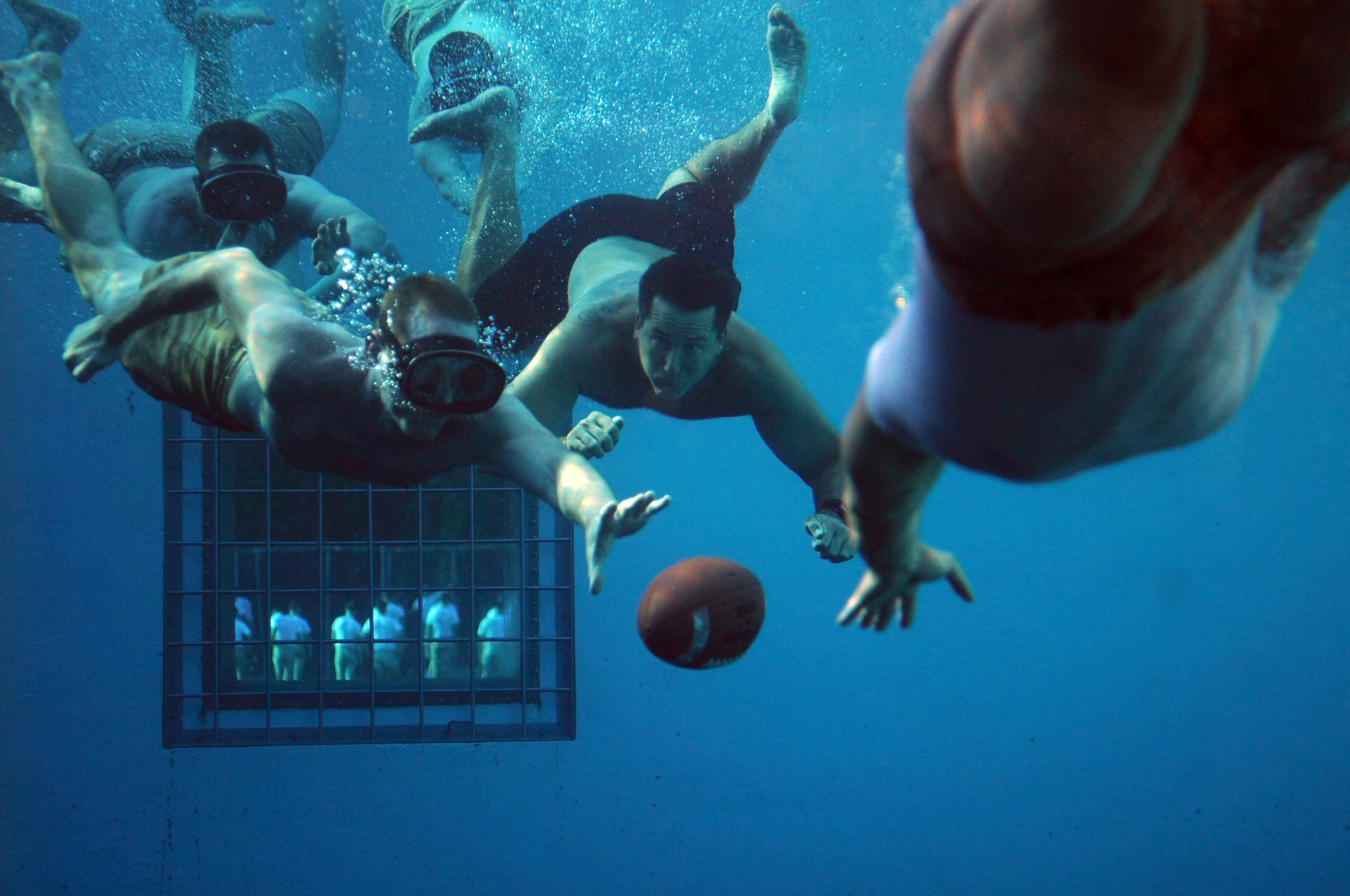
- Underwater football match involving United States Navy personnel in Panama City, Florida on June 3, 2011
- Highest governing body: Manitoba Underwater Council
- First played: 1967, University of Manitoba, Canada

Characteristics
- Contact: yes
- Team members: 13 (5 in play)
- Type: Aquatic
- Equipment: diving mask, snorkel, fins and water polo cap
- Venue: Swimming pool

Underwater football is a two-team underwater sport that shares common elements with underwater hockey and underwater rugby. As with both of those games, it is played in a swimming pool with snorkeling equipment (mask, snorkel, and fins).

The goal of the game is to manoeuvre (by carrying and passing) a slightly negatively buoyant ball from one side of a pool to the other by players who are completely submerged underwater. Scoring is achieved by placing the ball (under control) in the gutter on the side of the pool. Variations include using a toy rubber torpedo as the ball, and weighing down buckets to rest on the bottom and serve as goals.

It is played in the Canadian provinces of Alberta, Manitoba, Newfoundland and Labrador and Saskatchewan.

== Origins ==
Underwater football was developed in the 1960s by Dave Murdoch, a scuba diving instructor who was teaching in the Manitoba's Frank Kennedy Centre. The game developed from a "keep-away" training exercise that used a pool brick to develop the students snorkelling skills. It is still played there today.

== Rules ==
Several ball types have been used throughout the game's history. These include a 10-pound pool brick, a junior sized NFL-style football, and a junior sized basketball, all with negative buoyancy. Pneumatic balls (such as the football or basketball) can be made negatively buoyant by filling them with a liquid that is denser (heavier) than water instead of air, e.g. a strong saline solution or corn syrup.

The sport is similar to water polo, but it is played most of the time underwater. Each player can go up to the surface to take air as many times needed, except when he has the football in his hand.

Like the traditional football, one player from each team manoeuvre the ball past their opponents to get to the ball to goal. Each team has 13 players, but only five players are on the court at same time. The player with the ball can swim with it or pass the ball to his team players. Meanwhile, the opponents will try to take the ball from the other player or intercept a pass. And at last the team which has the maximum scores will win.

The court is 10 metres wide (32 ft), 15 metres (49 feet) long, and 4 metres (13 feet) deep.

A match has two 20-minute rounds, and a half-time of 5 minutes.

== Governing body ==
The governing body is the Manitoba Underwater Council, which supports competition by providing insurance required for the hire of swimming pools as well as sponsoring the cost of hire.

== See also ==
- Underwater rugby – Underwater team sport
- Underwater hockey – Underwater sport of pushing a puck into the opposing goal
