= Military diving =

Underwater diving in a military context by members of an armed force

Underwater divers may be employed in any branch of an armed force, including the navy, army, marines, air force and coast guard. The scope of operations includes: search and recovery, search and rescue, hydrographic survey, explosive ordnance disposal, demolition, underwater engineering, salvage, ships husbandry, reconnaissance, infiltration, sabotage, counterifiltration, underwater combat and security.

== History of military diving ==
Military divers are essential to many missions and campaigns. Combat and demolition work, underwater and coastal reconnaissance, ordnance disposal, search and rescue, salvage operations, construction, ship maintenance and underwater engineering. Every branch of the U.S. military employs divers, and more than 40 nations have military diving units. Military diving is an occupation that has risks and responsibilities beyond those of other professional diving. Research and development in military diving equipment and procedures often eventually contributes to recreational and technical diving practice.

Military diving development was influenced by the development of submarine technology in the early 20th century. There were several serious accidents following the widespread deployment of submarines, and the main application for military diving at that time was salvage and later rescue and recovery operations. Submarine escape equipment development helped with early scuba development.

Combat diving.

Fleet and engineering diving.

== Application of diving by branches of the military ==
- Navy divers are used in ships husbandry, marine construction and salvage, demolition and mine clearance and special forces.
- Army divers may be used in engineering activities such as bridge construction and demolition, and by special forces units.
- Marine divers may be used for reconnaissance, preparation for amphibious operations, coastal demolition, disposal of explosives and special operations
- Air forces frequently use divers for search and rescue missions.
- In some countries the coastguard is considered to be a military force, and there are several applications for coastguard diving operations both operationally and for ships husbandry purposes.

== Scope of operations ==
=== Clearance diving ===
Clearance divers are specialists in underwater demolition, explosive ordnance disposal and improvised explosive device disposal. They are tasked with locating and destroying or recovering underwater ordnance at sea in ships, in the approaches to ports and anchorages, in port facilities and installations and in the coastal environment of amphibious operations.

=== Ships husbandry ===
Ships husbandry or ship husbandry is all aspects of maintenance, cleaning, and general upkeep of the hull, rigging, and equipment of a ship. It may also be used to refer to aspects of maintenance which are not specifically covered by the technical departments. The term is used in both naval and merchant shipping, but naval vessel husbandry may also be used for specific reference to naval vessels. Underwater ships husbandry includes hull cleaning, inspection, and some kinds of repair work.

=== Search and recovery ===
Underwater search and recovery is the process of locating and recovering underwater objects, often by divers. but also by the use of submersibles, remotely operated vehicles and electronic equipment on surface vessels.

Recovery techniques depend upon the type and size of the object. Smaller objects, can simply be carried up by the diver. Heavier objects represent a material change to the diver's buoyancy control, and may put the diver at risk from an uncontrolled ascent if contact with the object is lost during ascent. Medium-sized objects are normally recovered using a lifting bag. Lift bags can be rated up to several tons, but these require an independent supply of inflation gas. Large objects usually require specialised commercial lifting equipment.

=== Military diver training ===
U.S. Naval combat underwater demolition team training manual (1944)

== See also ==
- Anti-frogman techniques – Methods of protection from incursions by divers and swimmers
- Frogman – Tactical scuba diver
