= In-water surface cleaning =

Methods of removing contaminants from underwater surfaces

In-water cleaning, also known as in-water surface cleaning, is a collection of methods for removing unwanted material in-situ from the underwater surface of a structure. This often refers to removing marine fouling growth from ship hulls, but also has applications on civil engineering structures, pipeline intakes and similar components which are impossible or inconvenient to remove from the water for maintenance. It does not generally refer to cleaning the inside of underwater or other pipelines, a process known as pigging. Many applications require the intervention of a diver, either to provide the power, or to direct a powered tool.

== Applications ==
- Removal of marine fouling for ship performance improvement.
- Removal of marine organisms to prevent infestation by alien species. Fouling of ships' bottoms by marine organisms is recognised as a major vector for the introduction of invasive alien species, which can have significant economic and environmental impacts. The risk can be mitigated by maintenance of the immersed surfaces to kill or remove fouling organisms before entry into the protected areas. The usual primary method is the use of anti-fouling coatings, which are themselves an environmental hazard due to toxicity. In-water cleaning is an adjunct to anti-fouling in cases where the coating has not been completely effective, and also carries a biosecurity risk due to the potential release of the removed organisms and toxins from the coatings.
- Removal of fouling and contaminants in preparation for inspection, maintenance or repair work.

== Methods ==
Manual methods:

- Removal of organisms by hand
- Cleaning using scrapers, hand brushes and scouring pads

Mechanical methods:

- Brushing – the use of a tool with bristles to scrape off the contaminants.
  - Brush cart – a device which transports powered brushes along the surface to be cleaned. Brush carts do not usually include a system for removal or treatment of waste, but it can be done if there is sufficient demand. Brushes that do not directly contact the surface coating can remove fouling without damaging the coating itself. The standoff can be controlled when the cart rolls over the surface on wheels. Some removal of the surface of some anti-fouling coatings may actually improve the performance by exposing a fresh layer with more concentrated active materials.
  - Rotary brush
- Water jetting
  - High pressure water jetting – when correctly applied, high pressure water jetting can provide acceptable levels of cleaning without damaging anti-fouling coatings or releasing toxins to the environment, but this requires fairly accurate control of jet angle and distance from the surface, and duration of impingement. In other circumstances water jetting can be used to remove paint. Water jetting can be applied manually by divers, by diver-operated carts, or by ROVs. Pressures of between 200 and 600 bar may be used in high-pressure water jetting. Cleaning rates are generally lower underwater than with the ship in dry dock, where rates of 200 m^{2} per hour are possible. Exceptionally heavy fouling may reduce the rate to 20 m^{2} per hour. With sufficient pressure, (around 750 bar), damaged concrete coating can be removed from steel pipelines without damage to the steel. Special nozzles are available for jetting between parallel surfaces and inside pipes. Jet geometry affects cleaning rate. A round jet has the maximum impact on the contamination, but the area affected is relatively small. A fan jet impinges on a much wider swath, but with less impact, and the width and impact of a fan jet are strongly affected by the distance between the nozzle and the surface. Where a fan jet is effective, the optimum distance and angle can be discovered by experiment, and will often vary across the surface. Soft or resilient deposits may peel off in coherent sheets if jetted at an angle of around 30 to 60° to the surface. More brittle deposits will tend to break up as they are detached, and may need a jetting angle nearer to perpendicular to the surface.
  - Abrasive water jetting – this system is intended to remove contaminants, coatings, and corrosion products down to the substrate. Abrasive grit is entrained in the jet of water and the impact of the grit has an aggressive cleaning action.
  - Cavitation water jet – this system uses jets of water containing cavitation voids of water vapour, generated ultrasonically in the nozzle, which develop high localised impact pressures on hard surfaces when the bubbles implode at the surface to be cleaned. This is claimed to do less damage to surface coatings than high pressure jetting, and reduce the hazard to the operator. The cavitation jet can remove fouling, loose paint and rust, without damage to sound paint when used correctly, but can erode ablative and self-polishing paint coatings if applied too closely or for too long. Tools include hand-held pistols, diver and self-propelled carts and potentially, also robotic systems. Suction systems to recover waste are available, and the waste can be treated or filtered.

== Capture and treatment of waste products ==
Depending on the reason for bottom cleaning, it may be desirable to capture and treat the waste dislodged from the surface. If the purpose is to remove potentially invasive alien species, then they must be removed from the water or killed. If the organisms are not a problem, it may be necessary to contain released toxins from the anti-fouling coating.

== Environmental impact ==
In-water cleaning of structures and vessels may distribute the surface contaminants in an area where they could be harmful. There are two main concerns:

- Release of potentially invasive alien organisms. This is mainly a problem when the fouled surface is on a vessel which has traveled from a different ecological region, and is covered with species alien to the region where it is cleaned.
- Release of toxins which may degrade the local environment. This is a concern where the surface has a layer of antifouling paint under the fouling layer.

== Effects on substrate ==
Some cleaning technologies can cause significant damage or degradation of the substrate, particularly removal or excessive abrasion of protective or biologically active surface coatings. In some cases removal of the upper layer of an anti-fouling paint can expose paint which has a stronger concentration of active biocides, which can reactivate the paint.
