= Wood–epoxy resin artifacts =

Objects made from a composite of wood and epoxy resin

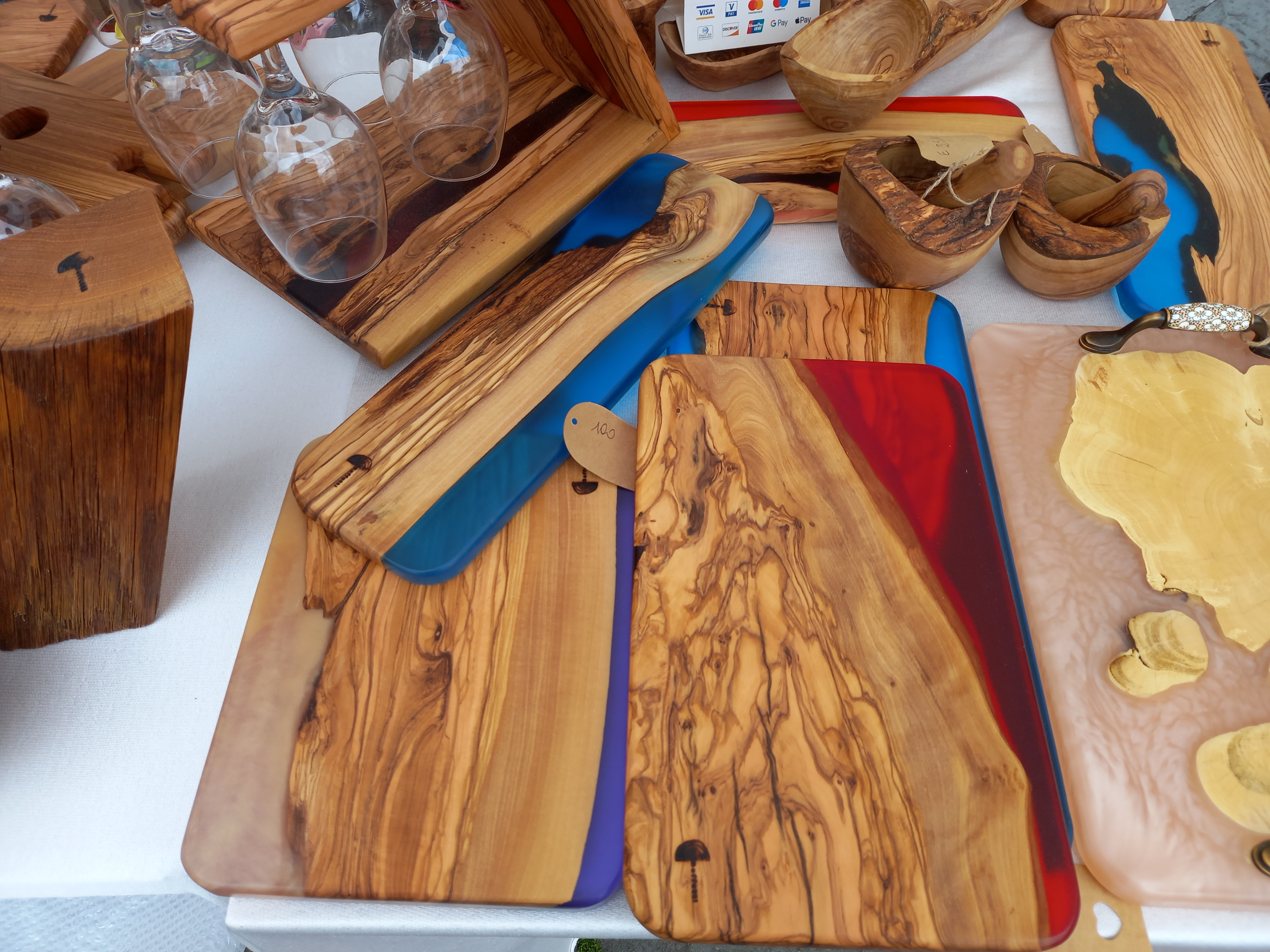
Wooden plates made of genuine olive wood and epoxy resin.

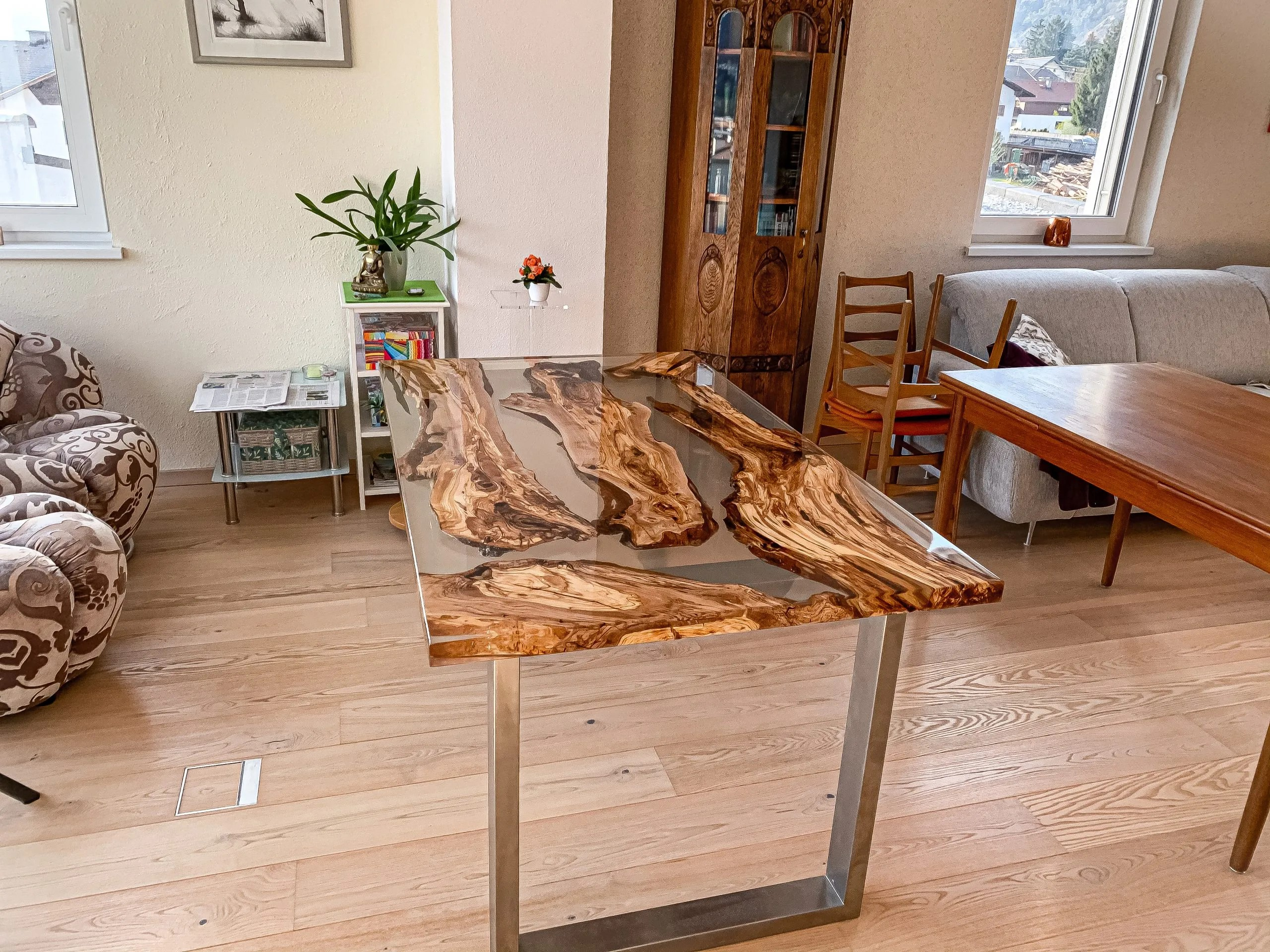
A decorative table made of wood and epoxy resin.

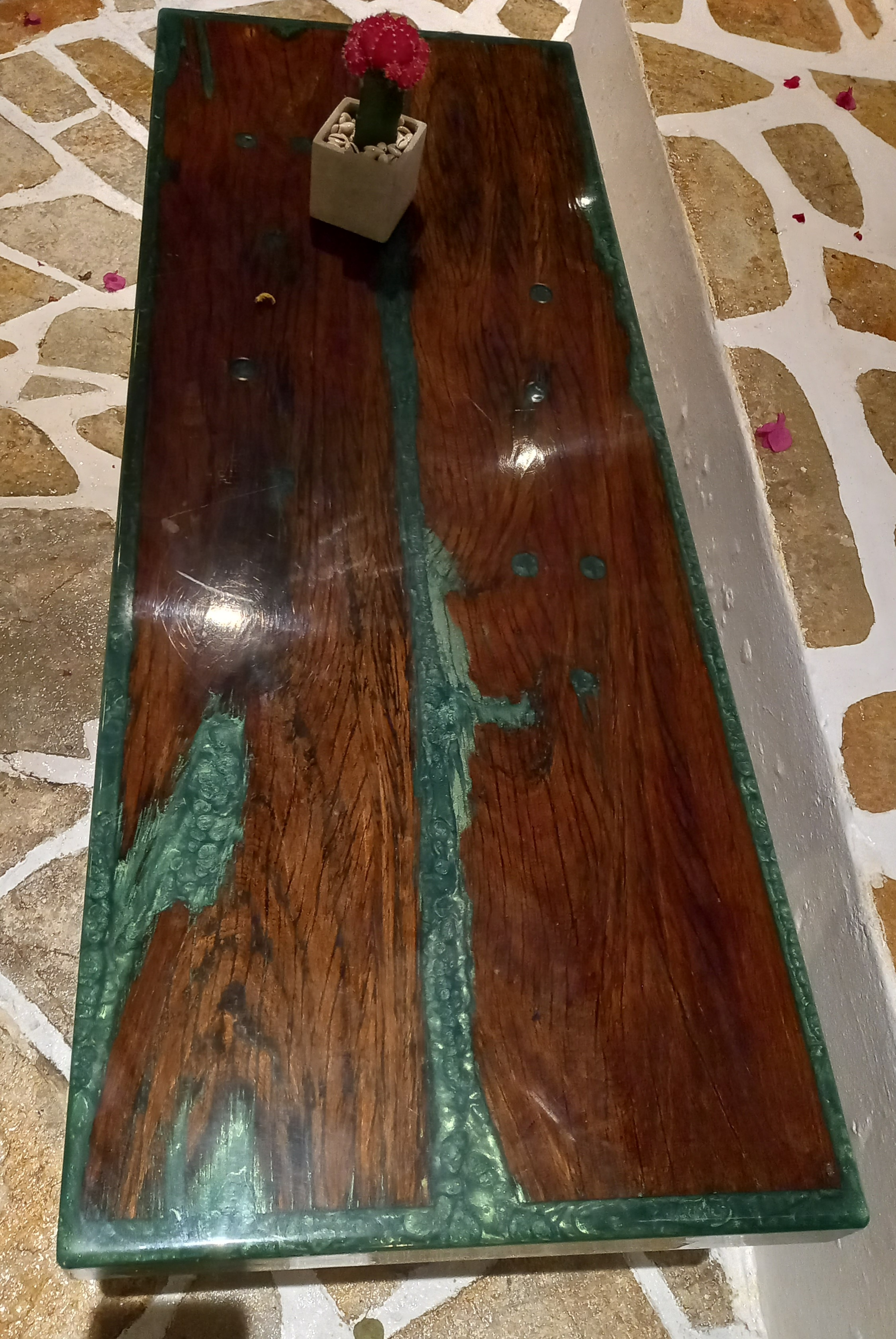
Table made of old treated Ipe sleepers and epoxy resin

Wood–epoxy resin artifacts are objects which were created by combining wood with epoxy resins to produce decorative or functional pieces. These pieces are typically used in woodworking, furniture design, sculpture, and crafts, and characterised by high aesthetics of the wood grain and/or translucent and colored resins. The combination is known for its artistic appeal, durability, and versatility, although, some health concerns for the artists have been raised in the media.

== Overview ==
Epoxy resin is a synthetic polymer that cures to form a strong, stable plastic. When used in combination with solid wood (mostly, olive, walnut and beech), it can enhance the physical properties of the product and also increase its strength and resistance to moisture. This combination has led to a rise in popularity of wood–epoxy resin items, especially in high-end and custom-made applications.

The typical forms of wood–epoxy artifacts usually include among others:

- Tables, usually "river tables", where the resin fills up the gap between wood slabs, resembling a river.
- Cutting boards and trays, in which the resin is used for mostly for decorative inlays.
- Art pieces which combine some aesthetic patterns, while colour-dye is added into the resins.
- Jewelry and small accessories – miniature resin-wood designs popular in boutique craftsmanship.

== Materials and techniques ==
The choice of wood and resin type greatly influences the final appearance and structural integrity of the artifact. Hardwood species such as walnut, maple, and oak are commonly used due to their strength and visual grain. By this way/technique, also wood specimens with defects or cracks, or even rotted ones, can be utilised in a very efficient way.

The epoxy resin may be clear, but in most cases is pigmented, allowing for creative freedom in the design process. Modern techniques often include:

- Casting: Pouring liquid resin into a mold or void within the wood.
- Embedding: Placing objects (e.g., stones, leaves, pigments) into resin layers.
- Turning: Shaping hardened resin-wood blanks on a lathe for bowls and pens.

== Applications ==
Originally utilized in marine construction and aerospace composites, wood–epoxy combinations now dominate niche markets in home décor and custom interiors.

The appeal of these items is due to the visual aesthetics and also in the repairable nature of the materials. The market for such artifacts has grown in the recent years, and has become polular in online platforms and social media. Also, in touristic areas, local makers can showcase and sell sevefral unique wood-epoxy creations.

== Environmental considerations ==
The use of synthetic resins raises serious concerns about sustainability and recyclability.

== See also ==
- Epoxy
- Composite material
- Woodworking
- Furniture design
- Resin casting
