= Underwater cutting and welding =

Metalworking techniques used by underwater divers

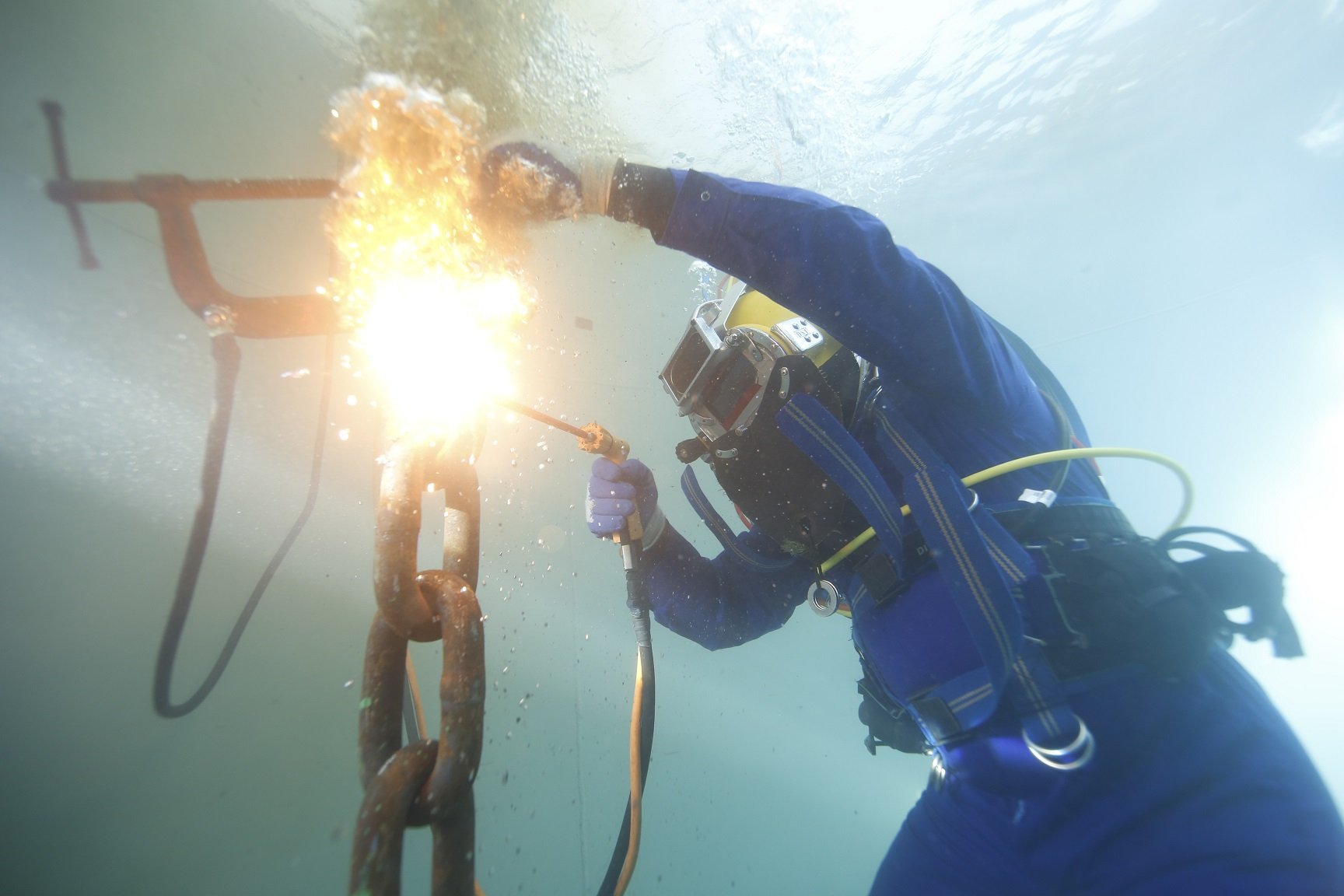
Underwater oxy-arc cutting

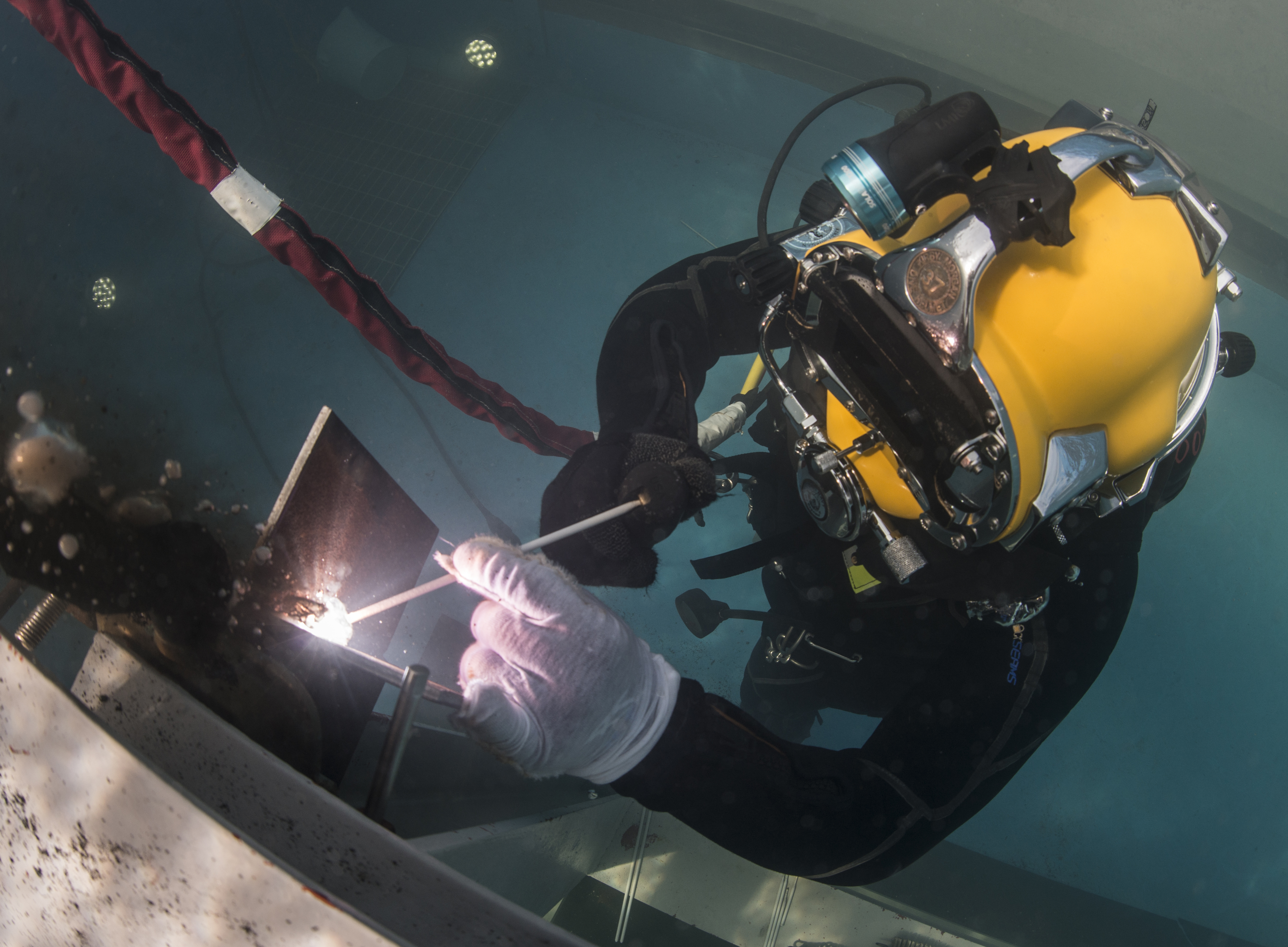
Underwater fillet weld in a training pool

Underwater cutting and welding are metalworking techniques used by underwater divers in underwater construction, marine salvage and clearance diving applications. Most underwater welding is direct current wet stick welding, and most underwater metal cutting is immersed oxygen-arc and shielded metal-arc cutting, though other technologies are available and sometimes used. These processes are mostly applied to steel structures as that is the most common arc-weldable material used in the underwater environment.

== Scope ==
Oxygen arc cutting and arc welding underwater requires greater skill and stamina than working in a dry and stable environment. The underwater environment imposes several limitations and restrictions on both the equipment and the operator, and the restriction of short bottom times at greater depths for surface-oriented divers makes efficient working important to getting the job done in a reasonable time.

The diving equipment encumbers the diver, water movement, unstable footing, and restricted visibility make it worse. The rapid cooling of water makes good weld quality difficult to achieve, so when practicable solutions using cutting are preferred to solutions requiring welding in salvage operations.

== Applications ==
Underwater construction is industrial construction in an underwater environment. There is often, but not necessarily, a significant component of commercial diving involved. It is a part of the marine construction industry. Underwater welding may be used, and for repair work cutting of steel or concrete may be necessary.

Marine salvage is the process of recovering a ship and its cargo after a shipwreck or maritime accident. Salvage may encompass towing, re-floating a vessel, or effecting repairs to a ship. Protecting the coastal environment from spillage of oil or other contaminants is also a high priority. Before the invention of radio, salvage services would be given to a stricken vessel by any ship that happened to be passing by. Most salvage is carried out by specialist salvage firms with dedicated crew and equipment.

The techniques applied in marine salvage are largely a matter of adapting available materials and equipment to the situation, which is often constrained by urgency, weather and sea conditions, accessibility of the site, and financial considerations. Diving is slow, labor-intensive, dangerous, expensive, constrained by conditions, and often inefficient, but may be the only, or most efficient, way to do some tasks.

Ships husbandry is all aspects of maintenance, cleaning, and general upkeep of the hull, rigging, and equipment of a ship. It may also be used to refer to aspects of maintenance which are not specifically covered by the technical departments. The term is used in both naval and merchant shipping, but naval vessel husbandry may also be used for specific reference to naval vessels.

== Underwater cutting ==
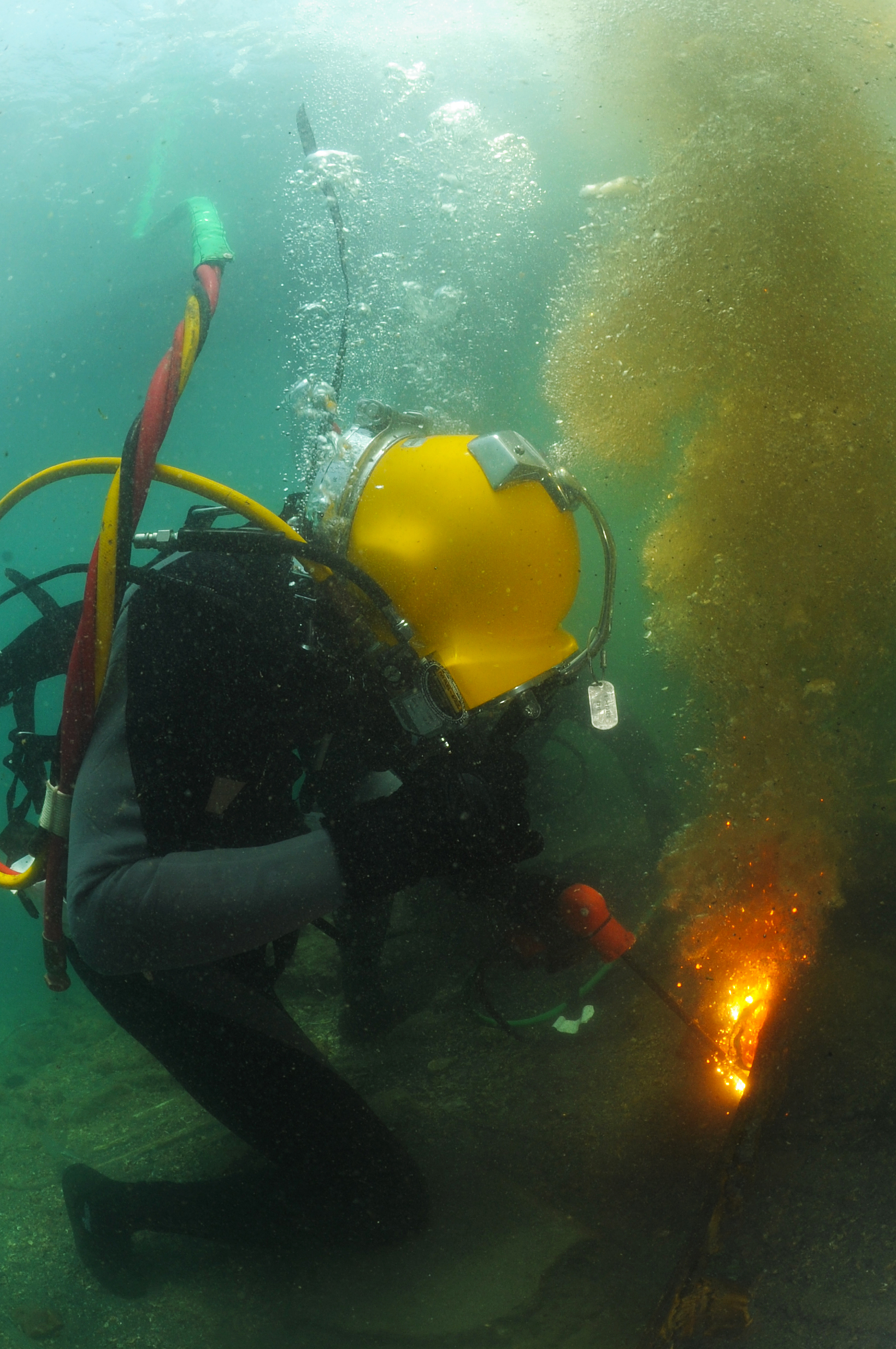
Diver cutting through a steel beam during welding operations

The most commonly used of the available technologies are oxygen-arc cutting and shielded metal arc cutting. For arc cutting and welding, the workpiece must be cleaned and grounded before an arc can be struck, and the quality of the cut will depend on the surface condition of the workpiece. The ground clamp must be firmly attached to bare clean metal.

It is easier to cut clean metal than corroded or growth-encrusted metal. Steel covered with ordinary mill scale and one or two thin coats of paint may be cut easily. Thick scale, thick paint, barnacles and similar marine growth make cutting difficult and should be removed first. An ordinary paint scrapper is useful in removing light scale and paint, but for heavier growths, a high-pressure water jet cleaning tool may be additionally used. If possible, both sides of the metal should be cleaned before cutting. Fouling and heavy corrosion on the back of the metal can clog the cut and prevent the cutting jet from blowing through. If inaccessible, striking the area to be cut with a heavy sledgehammer may sufficiently loosen scale on the opposite side.

=== Oxygen-arc cutting ===
Oxygen-arc cutting, also referred to as burning, is a process in which the metal is cut by oxidizing the heated metal, which is then blown away by the gas, it can use steel tubular electrodes or exothermic electrodes, which continue to burn independently of the arc once ignited and the oxygen is flowing. Oxygen-arc is preferred where practicable because it cuts plain and low carbon steel well. It is usually used with a constant current DC welding generator set on straight polarity, and the arc should ignite as the electrode touches the work. The tip of the electrode is consumed and must be replaced frequently as it burns down to a stub.

The tubular steel electrode consists of a steel tube with a waterproofed flux coating which is applied during manufacture. A typical electrode is 14 inches long with a 5/16-inch outer diameter and a bore diameter of slightly less than 1/8 inch. The waterproof flux coating is similar to the coating on welding electrodes, and both promotes easy striking and maintenance of the arc and the gases it produces form a bubble around the arc which keeps the water off for long enough to burn the heated metal under the arc. The flux is also an electrical insulator, which protects the diver in case of accidentally touching the electrode, and it prevents side arcing in tight spaces.

Exothermic electrodes will continue to burn once ignited as long as the oxygen flows, so the diver may have the current switched off after starting the cut, although the system will cut metals faster if the power remains on as the arc produces additional heat. The exothermic electrodes can melt or burn through almost any materials after they have been ignited.

Exothermic electrode cutting is simple and easy to learn, and can be used to cut thin metal when the power is off. Cutting speed is fast and ferrous and non-ferrous metals of any thickness, and a wide range of non-conductive materials like concrete and rock can be cut. They do not require a high operating current, and can be ignited from a 12 volt automotive starter battery.

=== Shielded metal arc cutting ===
Shielded metal arc cutting cuts the metal by melting it with the intense heat of the arc, without burning it with oxygen, which works better for carbon steel plate less than 6mm thick and for non-ferrous and corrosion resistant metals of any thickness.

Underwater shielded metal arc cutting is a simple process. Almost any waterproofed mild steel stick-type electrode can be used and can cut corrosion resistant steels and non-ferrous metals of any thickness. No oxygen is required, and the heat of the arc simply melts the metal which either drains away by gravity pushed out of the kerf by the diver using the electrode tip. Relying on gravity is not preferred because the water cools down the molten metal too fast.

== Underwater welding ==
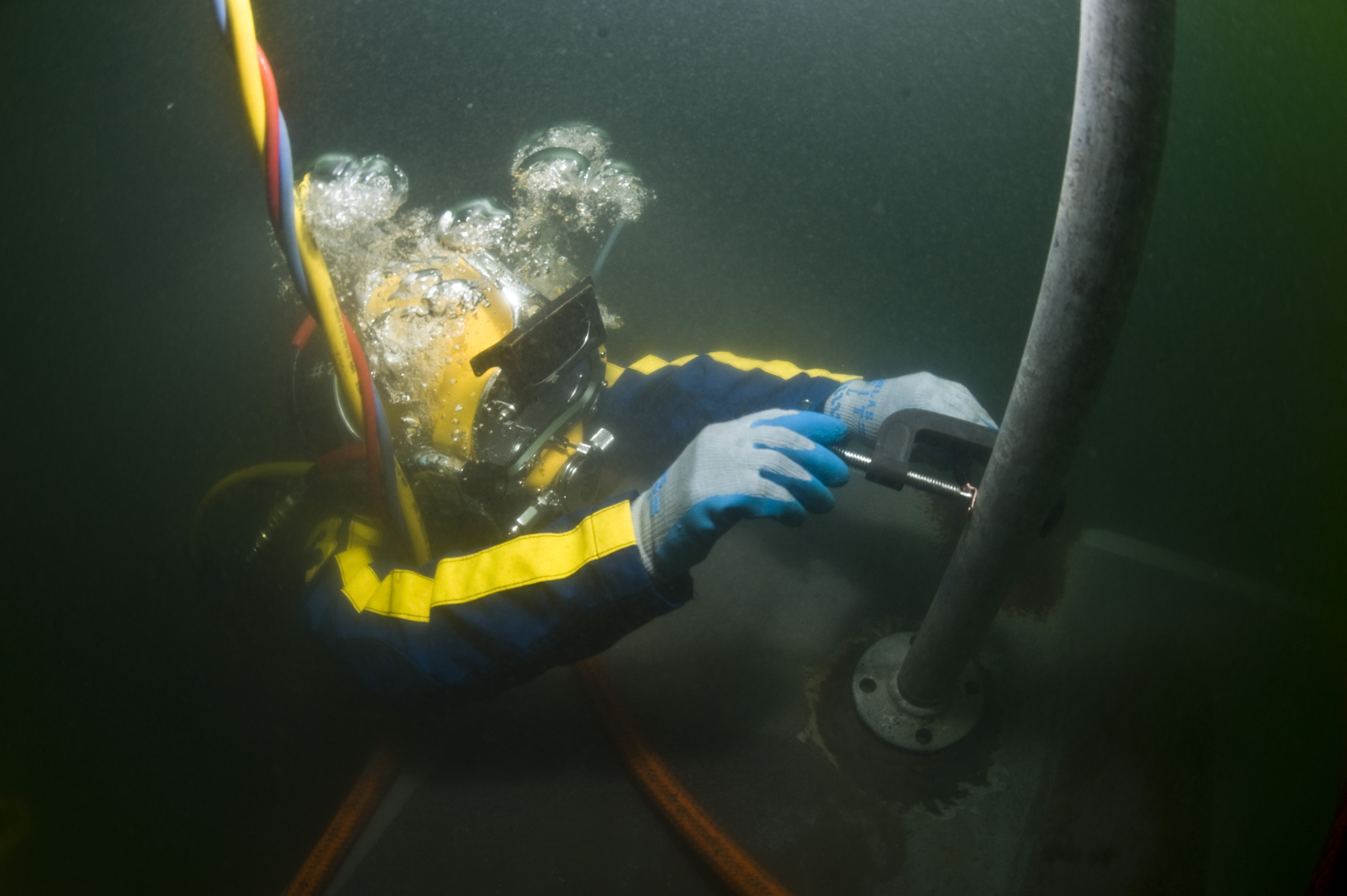
Attaching a grounding cable with a clamp

Wet welding is done with both the diver and the workpiece completely submerged, where shielded metal arc welding is the most widely used process. Most wet welding is done using direct current (DC) with the electrode negative, also known as straight polarity, as the electrode holder lasts longer with this polarity, but sometimes better results can be achieved with DC electrode positive, also called reverse polarity. Alternating current is not used for safety reasons.

=== Shielded metal arc welding ===
Shielded metal arc welding is produced by heating with an electric arc created between a flux-covered metal electrode and the work. The arc creates intense heat, generally between 7,000 to 11,000 °F (3,900 to 6,100 °C), concentrated in a very small area. It results in melting of the parent metal parts, the core wire and some of the flux covering. Other elements of the flux covering decompose to form a gaseous shield around the arc. This shield protects the molten metals from contamination by the surrounding atmosphere, in this case mainly superheated steam. As the electrode melts, small drops or globules of molten metal are formed, forced across the arc and deposited on the work into a molten pool which solidifies, forming a bead of weld metal. The drops or globules do not simply fall into the pool by gravity but are forced by the electric current flow. Otherwise, overhead welding would not be possible.

The wet welding process used for salvage operations is usually a simple underwater joining technique. The equipment used is commercially manufactured shielded metal arc equipment and waterproofed electrodes. Minimal ancillary devices are needed. These include lighting, staging and hand tools. The advantages to wet welding are that the underwater welder can work freely on any portion of complex structures or on sections with restricted access, whereas other underwater welding techniques may encounter access difficulties. Patching can be done faster and at less cost because no time is lost in construction and installation of enclosures. Standard welding power sources and equipment are used, so a wet welding job can be easily initiated at remote job sites. Wet welding also allows more freedom of patch design and size of patch sections.

== Equipment ==
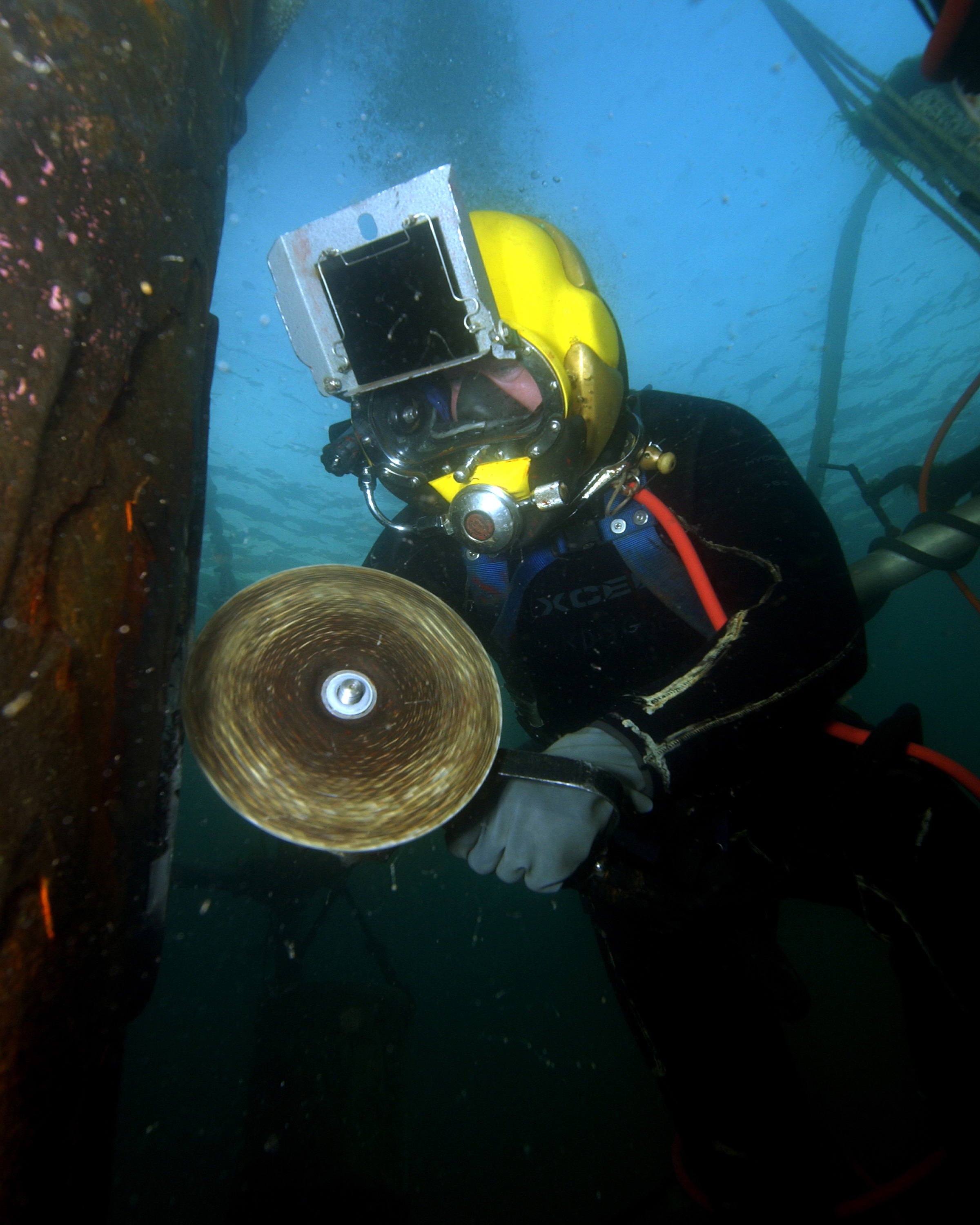
Diver uses a grinder to trim down a repair patch

Underwater oxygen arc cutting, shielded metal arc cutting, and wet welding are performed with essentially the same high current DC welding equipment, to which special electrode holders and an oxygen supply are added for oxygen-arc cutting. A knife type safety switch is recommended for making and breaking the welding circuit as it is immediately evident whether it is closed or open. Additional accessories include scrapers, grinders, and wire brushes high pressure waterjetting and abrasive waterjetting equipment which are used for surface preparation for both underwater cutting and welding operations.

The diving equipment used is basic surface-supplied diving equipment with voice communications, fitted with welding shields that can be hinged down over the faceplate to protect the diver's vision. Suitable heavy duty rubber gloves and overalls may be used in addition to a diving suit appropriate to the general underwater conditions.

Rigging and access equipment may be needed appropriate to the specific task.

== Safety ==
Serious injury or death may result if adequate precautions are not followed during underwater cutting or welding operations.

The life-threatening hazards of underwater cutting and welding are associated with the electrical current and gases used or generated during the process:

- If the diver passes between the position of the ground connection and the electrode, they will become part of the electrical circuit, which can cause electrical shock injury. Electrical shock produced by alternating current can prevent voluntary relaxation of the muscles controlling the hand. Consequently, the diver may be unable to let go of their body or equipment accidentally becomes part of an AC electrical circuit, so AC power is not used for underwater cutting or welding. DC shock is less dangerous, but still unpleasant at the least. Keeping out of the circuit requires continual attention and awareness by the diver.
- Extremely hot electrodes and workpieces can burn the diver through protective clothing and do severe damage to diving equipment, such as umbilical hoses.
- The welding current generates explosive gas mixtures, which may be trapped in adjacent structure and accumulate, and if detonated could harm the diver and other equipment and structure.
- Welding currents may cause accelerated galvanic corrosion.
- Oxygen partial pressure increases with water depth, thereby creating a fire hazard in habitat environments. At depths greater than 60 FSW, gas filled welding habitats should be filled with an inert gas.

== See also ==
- Marine salvage – Recovering a ship or cargo after a maritime casualty
- Underwater work – Work done underwater during diving operations
- Clearance diver – Navy diver specialised in explosives
- Commercial diving – Professional diving on industrial projects
- Offshore diving – Diving outside the territorial waters of a country
- Underwater construction – Industrial construction in an underwater environment
