= Underwater construction =

Industrial construction in an underwater environment

Underwater construction is industrial construction in an underwater environment. It is a part of the marine construction industry. It can involve the use of a variety of building materials, mainly concrete and steel. There is often, but not necessarily, a significant component of commercial diving involved. Some underwater work can be done by divers, but they are limited by depth and site conditions. And it is hazardous work, with expensive risk reduction and mitigation, and a limited range of suitable equipment. Remotely operated underwater vehicles are an alternative for some classes of work, but are also limited and expensive. When reasonably practicable, the bulk of the work is done out of the water, with underwater work restricted to installation, modification and repair, and inspection.

== Scope and applications ==
Underwater construction is common in the civil engineering, coastal engineering, energy, and petroleum extraction industries.

=== Civil engineering ===
- Construction below the water table is mostly managed by using cofferdams or pressurised caissons to exclude water sufficiently to work above the local water level within the enclosure, though it may also be possible to keep the water level down by pumping it out as fast as it seeps in, thereby artificially lowering the water table at the worksite.
- Dams, reservoirs, canals, locks
- Bridges and causeways over bodies of water often require foundation structure below water level. Usually this is done using coffer dams and caissons, which themselves may involve underwater work.

=== Coastal engineering ===
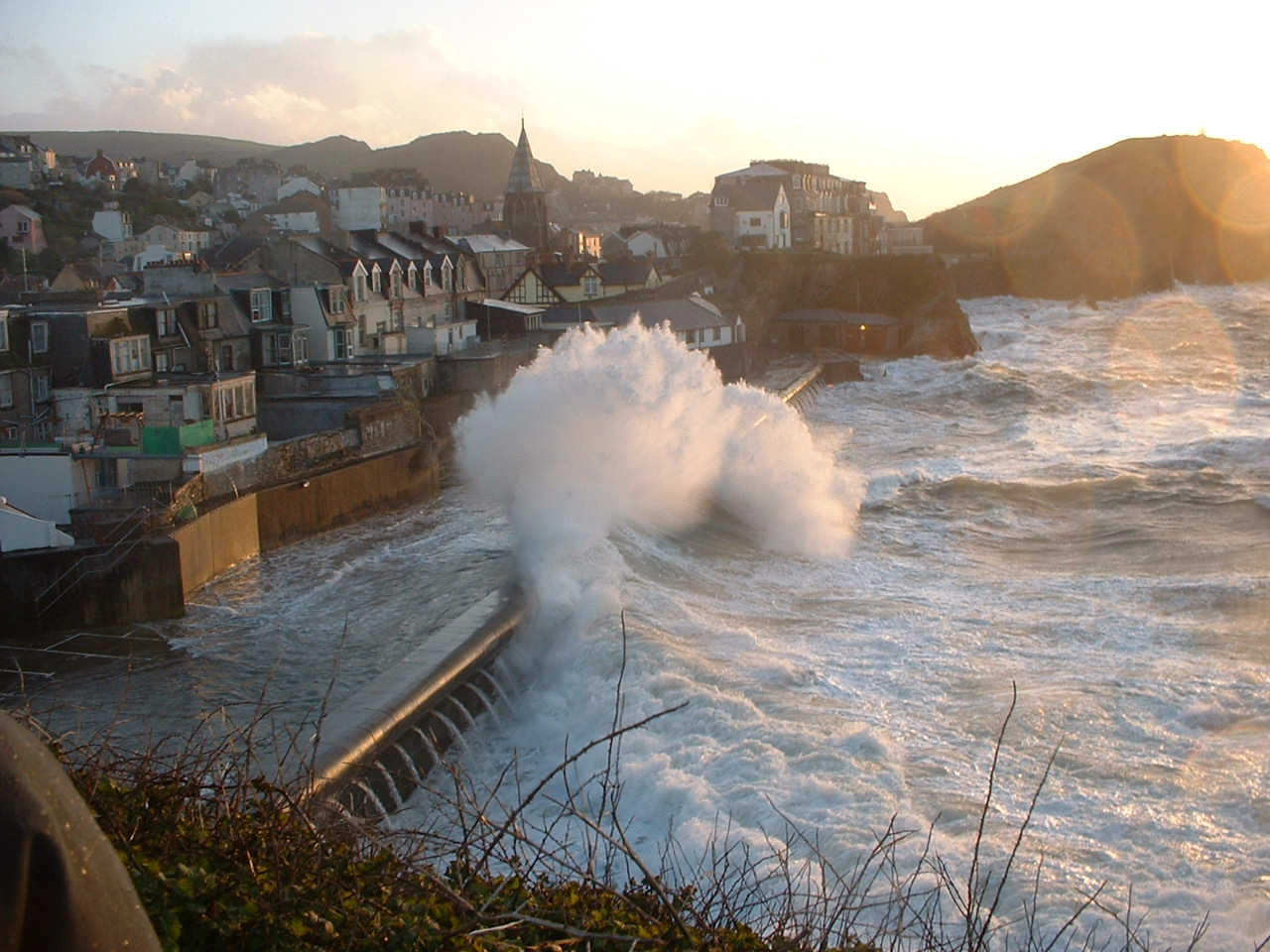
Wave attack on Ilfracombe's sea walls during a storm.

Coastal engineering is a branch of civil engineering concerned with the specific demands posed by constructing at or near the coast, as well as the development of the coast itself.

Harbours, docks, breakwaters, jetties, piers, wharfs and similar structures are all immediately adjacent to, or project into coastal waters, and are supported in part by seabed.

Stormwater and sewer outfalls require pipelines to be laid underwater.

Dykes, levees, navigation channels, canals, locks.

=== Energy infrastructure ===
- Inshore and offshore wind farms
- Tidal power and wave power generation
- Hydroelectric plant
- Power station cooling system intakes and outfalls

=== Offshore petroleum extraction ===
- Marine wellhead completions
- Offshore moorings
- Submarine pipelines

== Relevant technology ==
- Civil engineering is a professional engineering discipline that deals with the design, construction, and maintenance of the physical and naturally built environment, including public works such as roads, bridges, canals, dams, airports, sewage systems, pipelines, structural components of buildings, and railways.
- Coastal engineering is the branch of civil engineering concerned with construction at or near the coast, and the development of the coast itself.
- Structural engineering is a sub-discipline of civil engineering relating to the form and shape of structures, and the stability, strength, rigidity and response to external loads of built structures.
- Underwater concrete placement, by Tremie, skip, Pumped concrete, toggle bags, bagwork, usually to build foundations or coastal structures, and grouted aggregate.
- Underwater rock blasting, or dredging of softer sediments, to clear an area of a navigational hazard, to excavate a canal or basin, or to prepare for foundations.
- Piling, including piles driven to serve directly as the support member, and sheet piles, which may be used as formwork for cast concrete, or for constructing cofferdams, to allow the enclosed area to be dewatered.
- Caissons and cofferdams may be used to allow unimmersed work below the surface level of the water. In closed caissons the internal pressure may be raised to keep water out. Occupants need to use an airlock for access, and may require decompression stops when exiting.
- Underwater demolition, for removal of damaged structure in repair work, or to prepare an area for new construction.
- Underwater surveying: site surveys and geological surveys
- Underwater inspection of underwater structures, installations, and sites is a common diving activity, applicable to planning, installation, and maintenance phases, but the required skills are often specific to the application. Much use is made of video and still photographic evidence, and live video to allow direction of the inspection work by the supervisor and topside specialists. Inspections may also involve surface preparation, often by cleaning, and non-destructive testing. Tactile inspection may be appropriate where visibility is poor. Inspection can also be done using remotely controlled underwater vehicles.
- Underwater cutting and welding, may be necessary, though in most cases it can be avoided in new construction.
- Commercial diving, is used when necessary or when it is an economical alternative, when work must be done by a human operator at an underwater worksite.
- Hyperbaric work may be appropriate in a pressurised caisson.
- Hyperbaric welding, when necessary in new construction, may be done in a dry habitat designed to provide a dry enclosure at ambient pressure around the area to be welded.
- Corrosion protection may be necessary for exposed metal structural components.

== Materials ==
The most commonly used materials in marine construction are concrete and steel.

== Role of divers ==
- Inspection of underwater site and work
- Setting of explosives for clearance
- Underwater rigging
- Erection and dismantling of underwater formwork and underwater concrete placement activities.

== Occupational safety and health issues ==
Underwater work by divers on construction sites is generally within the scope of diving regulations. The work may also come within the scope of other occupational heath and safety related regulations.

== Organisations ==
=== Military ===
- US Navy Underwater Construction Teams

== See also ==
- Underground construction – Field of engineering for the design and construction of structures below the ground
- Offshore construction – Installation of structures and facilities in a marine environment
- Planetary surface construction – Construction of structures on planetary surface
- Space architecture – Architecture of off-planet habitable structures
- Underwater habitat – Human habitable underwater enclosure filled with breathable gas
