= Marine construction =

Building structures in or adjacent to large bodies of water

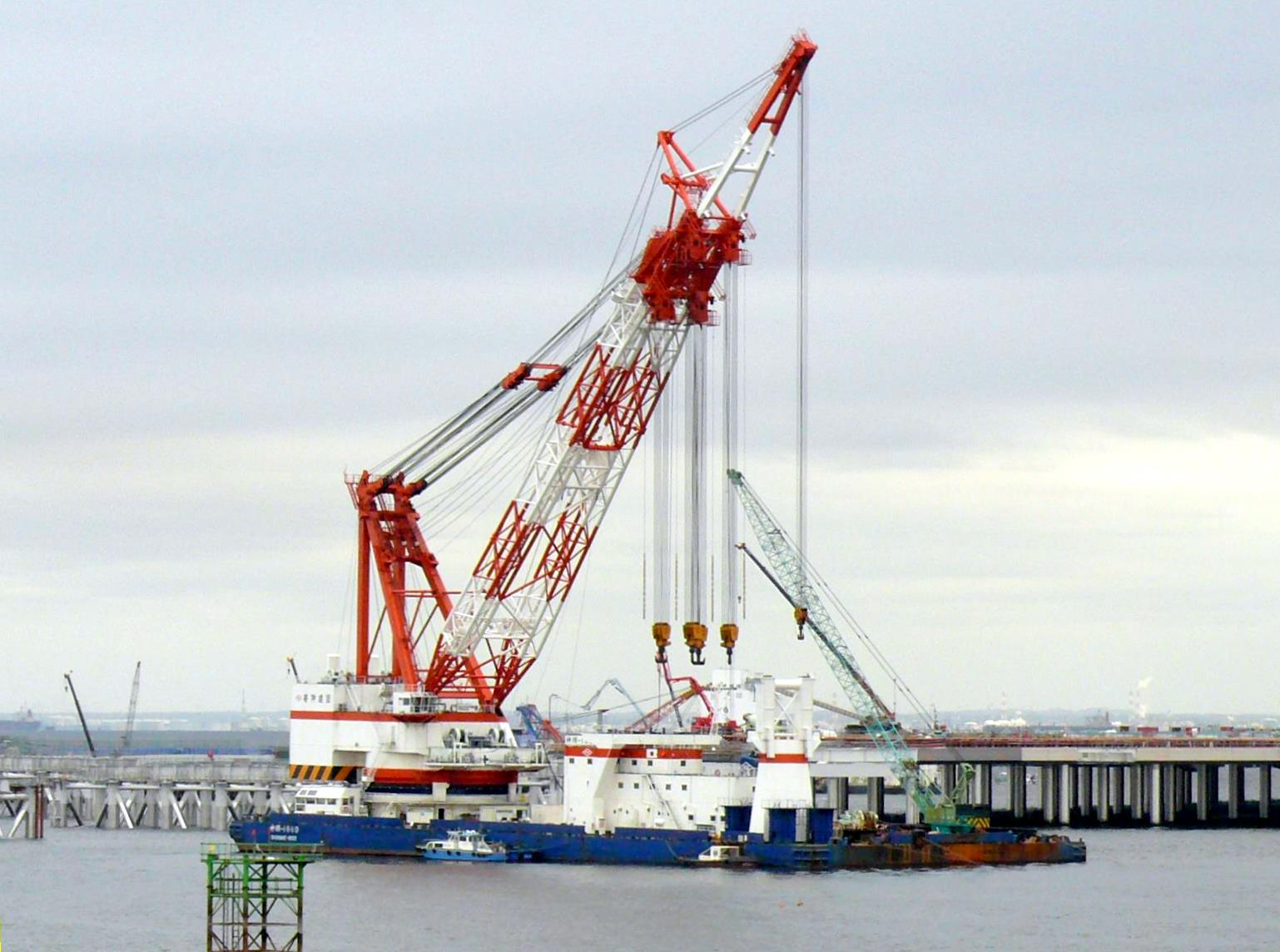
Barge outfitted with Cranes is towed into position.

Marine construction is the process of building structures in or adjacent to large bodies of water, usually the sea. These structures can be built for a variety of purposes, including transportation, energy production, and recreation. Marine construction can involve the use of a variety of building materials, predominantly steel and concrete. Some examples of marine structures include ships, offshore platforms, moorings, pipelines, cables, wharves, bridges, tunnels, breakwaters and docks. Marine construction may require diving work, but professional diving is expensive and dangerous, and may involve relatively high risk, and the types of tools and equipment that can both function underwater and be safely used by divers are limited. Remotely operated underwater vehicles (ROVs) and other types of submersible equipment are a lower risk alternative, but they are also expensive and limited in applications, so when reasonably practicable, most underwater construction involves either removing the water from the building site by dewatering behind a cofferdam or inside a caisson, or prefabrication of structural units off-site with mainly assembly and installation done on-site.

== Environmental influences ==
Some aspects of the marine environment that complicate construction:

- Distance from permanent facilities causes logistical problems for provision of materials, equipment, power supplies, and accommodation.
- Hydrostatic pressure due to depth in the water column. Hydrostatic pressure is linear with depth and increases at approximately 1 bar for every ten metres of depth.
- Temperature of the water and the air above it. Sea surface temperature can vary from a minimum of −2 °C (28 °F) to a maximum of about 32 °C (90 °F). Higher surface temperatures decrease rapidly with depth, and generally reach a steady-state of about 2 °C (36 °F) by about 1,000 metres (3,300 ft), though on Australia's Northwest Shelf, water and seabed temperature may exceed 30 °C (86 °F) at a depth of 250 metres (820 ft). Air temperatures may vary much more, and though the water has a moderating effect, the air temperature more variable and may be much more extreme.
- Seawater and splash zone chemistry
- Biofouling
- Currents cause drag loading on structures and equipment. There are several different types of currents in the seas. Categorised by their cause, these include geostrophic, tidal, wind-driven, oceanic circulation and density, as well as those caused by river discharge. River currents are driven mainly by gravity, but differ laterally and vertically. The highest velocity in river currents is usually near the outer bank in a bend, and hey also locally increase around obstructions to their flow. Current may also spin off eddies, and their lateral boundaries may vary considerably over the short term. There may also be short or long term vertical components in some areas, the upwellings and downwellings often associated with bottom topography and winds in coastal areas. Currents may be stratified vertically, even to the extent that they may flow in opposing directions at the surface and at the bottom. Their influence on underwater construction is a consequence of the drag forces induced and the transport of unconsolidated sediment, particularly by scour, both during and after construction. Water passing over an immersed surface can also cause lift forces, proportional to the square of the velocity, which can complicate operations, so the variations of instantaneous velocity induced by waves can further complicate matters.
- Waves are a further environmental influence near the surface, which cause perturbations in all six degrees of freedom on a floating object, and can exert large forces on a fixed object. They are a major cause of delays and reduced operating efficiency, and may be the major design criterion for fixed structures. Tsunamis are a class of wave which occur relatively seldom but can have a devastating effect due to the large amounts of energy they can carry over long distances at high speeds. The depth to which a wave has significant motion is a function of wave length, and to a lesser extent, on wave height.
- Wind
- Tides and storm surges
- Rain, snow and fog reduce visibility, but with radar and precision positioning systems they are not as serious a hazard as in the past. Nevertheless, they may cause delays in some operations. In heavy rainfall appreciable quantities of water may enter unprotected openings, and must be removed before it has adverse effects on stability due to free-surface. Fog may be of the summer fog type which forms some distance above the water and may leave a narrow band of clear air just above the water, or winter type, where there mat be dense fog just above the water but clear skies a short distance up. Rain, fog and snow may prevent helicopter operations, which generally require good visibility for landing. Snow may present the additional problem of removal to prevent accumulation. Spray caused by wind and waves can also dump large amounts of water which must be drained, and in colder conditions may freeze and build up a burden of ice. Severe spray may prevent people from working on deck. Atmospheric icing, also known as black ice can occur in sub-Arctic regions, when the air is humid and the temperature is low. Ice forms directly on cold surfaces and can accumulate rapidly, adding topside weight and increasing wind drag. Icing and frozen spray may occur in the same regions and in similar conditions. Lightning is generally not a major problem to steel and concrete structure with adequate lightning protection, but is a hazard to personnel working in high exposed areas.
- Sea ice and icebergs
- Earthquakes and tsunamis
- Scour
- Siltation

== Geotechnical aspects ==
The geology of the seabed has a strong influence on almost any marine structure. The seabed is the substrate on which the structure must stand, and both the morphology and the material affect the design and construction. It is therefore necessary for accurate and reliable geological surveys to be made before a construction project can be started. There have been developments in sampling of seabeds but some soils remain difficult to analyse and sampling may not produce results as accurate as would be desired. In-place strength may be greater than conventional sampling methods indicate, and sampling methods may not recover and identify critical constituents due to insufficient sampling. Failure to identify potential problems can lead to delays and cost overruns. Many marine structures cover extensive areas, and the soil properties may vary considerably. Cost and time constraints may make it difficult to gather sufficient samples from borings to fully describe the substrate. Other methods for remote substrate analysis may identify potential variations for closer examination.

Bottom material is often sedimentary, and in deeper water, may range from extremely fine, low density silts to loose gravels, to dense, highly compacted sands. Granular sediments may be subject to liquefaction if strongly disturbed, as by earthquakes, cyclic impact of storm waves, or crushing by sea ice. When this occurs the soil can behave like a dense liquid. This can also happen during some construction processes, such as piledriving. The presence of large boulders in glacial till deposits can give a misleading impression of bedrock, hiding the further extent of softer sediment below.

In arctic regions, permafrost can form an unreliable foundation, and deeply buried clathrates can be a problem when drilling, but are usually too deep to be a problem for construction.

Methane can occur at shallow depths in delta sediments with significant quantities of organic matter, and in arctic silts. These can reduce the shear strength of silty and clay soils. A sudden, large release may temporarily reduce water density sufficiently to cause vessels or drill rigs to sink, and can cause an explosion or fire at the surface.

Clays may initially support a steep slope when excavated, but are subject to creep and sudden large-scale collapse when subjected to shock loads or vibration.

Unconsolidated sand – seasonal shifts.

Underwater sand dunes can form where there are strong currents, which may move with the currents, as sand is lifted by flow over the back of the dune, and dropped at the front. This can be a problem when laying pipelines, and may require deeper than usual burial.

== Ecological and societal impact ==
Topics of concern:

- Oil and petroleum products
- Toxic chemicals
- Contaminated soils
- Construction wastes
- Turbidity
- Sediment transport, scour, and erosion
- Air pollution
- Disturbance and destruction of marine habitats
- Noise
- Impact on traffic
- Protection of existing structures
- Liquefaction of soils
- Third party safety
- Archaeological impact. Early civilisations often left traces of their presence in coastal areas and along river banks, which may be found during construction work. Legislation will generally provide guidance on how to manage such sites when they are discovered.

== Materials and fabrication ==
Marine construction materials subjected to coarse conditions including corrosion and temperature change. Fabrication can also be complicated by the large scale of some structures, and the need to transport them to the site for modular installation, and possible thermal differences between components and the fabrication and installation sites. The most commonly used materials in marine construction are concrete and steel.

=== Steel ===
Durability in the marine environment is affected by corrosion, both inside and outside of hollow structures, and can be particularly severe in crevices and cracks. The interior surfaces of steel tanks may also be corroded by liquids and other substances stored in them. The rate of corrosion may be increased by abrasion or erosion, and also by higher temperature, higher oxygen concentration, and the presence of chloride ions. Corrosion is therefore usually most severe in the splash zone.

==== Materials ====
Steels are measured by the following material properties:

- Minimum yield strength
- Minimum ultimate strength
- Minimum elongation at rupture
- Notch toughness at low temperatures
- Properties in the thickness direction (properties on the z-axis)
- Weldability
- Fatigue endurance
- Alloy composition
- Corrosion resistance

==== Fabrication and Welding ====
For major projects, coded welders (approved welder, tested against a particular standard) may be stipulated, and non-destructive and mechanical testing may be specified. Design of joints and fabrication methods should take stress raisers and ambient conditions into consideration to minimise the risk of fatigue cracking, and weld preparation and finishing processes should also take this into consideration.

==== Coatings and corrosion protection ====
Steel is subject atmospheric corrosion, splash zone corrosion, crevice corrosion, and other causes, including corrosion due aerobic and anaerobic bacteria interacting. Seawater rates are twice that of freshwater. Coatings may delay the start of corrosion by 10 to 20 years.

When reasonably practicable, workshop conditions of suitable humidity and protection from hazardous weather should be used when painting and coating steel structures, and keeping joint surfaces clean for welding. This may require temporary shelter to be erected, and heating or dehumidification may be required.

Sacrificial anodes or impressed current cathodic protection are used to protect steel in immersed areas. Anodes must be secured to prevent damage during transport. Effective connection are required between anodes and structures. It is prohibited in en closed spaces or where gas may be trapped because hydrogen may be generated and may produce an explosive atmosphere.

Steel coatings may be applied to steel that will primarily be underwater if the coating has the required resistance to cathodic disbondment. Additional protection may be provided by materials like copper nickel or by usage of additional steel to thicken the area allowed for corrosion. Allowances of 0.1 to 0.3 mm per year are typical.

=== Structural concrete ===
Prestressed and reinforced concrete have been used for several decades for the construction of large offshore platforms, mostly in the North Sea. Concrete is also used together with steel structure in hybrid and composite designs, and cement grout is used on steel platforms to bond piles to the skirts and jacket legs.

The component materials must be well matched to work effectively. It must be durable when exposes to the sea and air. Careful design and quality control during fabrication help to provide long service with low maintenance. The splash zone is most vulnerable to seawater damage, while the immersed zone and areas below the mudline have few problems. The atmospheric and splash zones have high susceptibility to chloride and carbon dioxide corrosion of the reinforcing steel.

==== Mixes and properties ====
- High-performance concrete
- Ultra-high performance concrete
- Low-density structural concrete

=== Combined steel–concrete structures ===
Two forms of combined steel and concrete construction have been used to advantage:

The hybrid approach:

- Structural steel superstructures supported by concrete substructures,
- Structural steel frames supporting exterior concrete walls and slabs,
- Steel hinge providing an articulated connection between a concrete base and a steel or concrete column.

For these structures, the main problem is the working of the joint under cyclic-dynamic loads, which can frequently be managed by pre-stressing the connection. Care must be taken to ensure that the stresses set up by this method are of the correct type to suit each material, and that the bearing loads are evenly distributed to avoid bursting stresses.

The composite approach:

Typical examples include:

- A concrete deck is connected to a steel beam by casting it over studs welded to the beam top surface. The concrete takes compression, and the steel carries tension and transverse shear. This system is commonly used in bridge construction.
- Special shear connectors in the form of transverse bars or perforated vertical plates, are welded to the steel.
- Two steel plates, spaced apart and tied together by steel webs, bars, or bolts, are filled with concrete. The concrete distributes local loads and carries out of plane shear loads.

This type of composite construction appears to have advantages where offshore structures must withstand high local impact forces, such as ice or ship collision, and for the walls of concrete structures where cracks and leakage are unacceptable and difficult or impossible to repair.

=== Titanium ===
Titanium has high strength and is very resistant to corrosion, but is also very expensive, so it tends to be used in highly-corrosive environments or as cladding.

== Equipment ==
Some classes of major equipment frequently used in marine construction:

- Barges
  - Crane barges
  - Revolving derrick barges
  - Semi-submersible barges
  - Jack-up barges
  - Launch barges
  - Catamaran barges
- Pipe-laying ships and barges
- Dredgers and hopper barges
- Platform supply vessels
- Anchor handling vessels
- Heavy-lift ships
- Towboats
- Drilling vessels
- Crew boats
- Floating concrete plant
- Tower cranes
- Diving support vessels

Other equipment typically used in land-based civil and structural engineering appropriate to the materials in use is also used, sometimes without modification, and sometimes modified or specially adapted to suit the working environment.

== Marine operations ==
Commonly marine and offshore operations include towing, mooring, ballasting, lifting and lowering heavy loads, personnel transfer, surveying, inspection, and diving.

- Towing
- Moorings and Anchors
- Lifting and setting heavy loads
- Personnel transfer at sea
- Underwater interventions, diving, underwater work systems, remotely operated underwater vehicles and remote manipulators
- Underwater concreting and grouting
- Surveying and navigation
- Temporary buoyancy augmentation

=== Seafloor modifications ===
The seafloor may be covered with level sediments that have been consolidated over the years and provide a stable platform, but this is often not the case, and the construction site may be uneven, covered with unconsolidated, weak sediment, lie on a slope, or be irregular, with rock outcroppings or scattered boulders.

There two ways to manage an unsuitable substrate. In the past, most cases of offshore construction adapted the structure to suit the substrate, but the second method is often used for major land structures and can and has been used for shallow water harbor and coastal structures. Seafloor preparation can also have significant potential advantages for deep water. There is normally time available to prepare the site during the lead time for procurement and fabrication of the structure before installation.

Seafloor modifications to improve performance of foundations are intended to provide a stable base of sufficient strength to support the structure and to resist failure and degradation for both a single extreme event and repetitive dynamic loads. In some cases, extensions to the foundations may be placed to protect the structure moving ice or ship collision. These operations may include:

The site may be prepared by dredging, levelling and removal of obstructions. Soft material may be removed, consolidated or reinforced, and high areas of hard material and rock removed. Granular material such as crushed rock, gravel, and sand can be placed and leveled as a practicable and economical fill for a reasonably level and uniform support for structures, either across the whole site, in low areas, or as a replacement for previously removed soft materials.

Sand piles and stone columns can be used to provide better bearing strength for weak soils like silts and clays, and are installed by drilling or driving a mandrel into the soil into which the coarser material is fed before forcing it out under pressure and removing the mandrel. The process is rapid where only small areas need to be improved. This method increases both bearing and shear resistance and can prevent liquefaction. Injection of cementitious material, following land-based grouting procedures, can be used to displace pore water and give a stronger substrate. The cementing pressures must displace the water yet not cause fracturing of the formation by channelization. Cement particles must be small enough to penetrate the interstices, and a wetting agent can be added to the grout to reduce viscosity.

- Measures to prevent liquefaction of the substrate
- Protection from scour

=== Installation of piles ===
A pile or piling is a vertical or near vertical structural element of a deep foundation, driven or drilled deep into the ground at the building site. There are many reasons why a deep foundation may be preferred, such as large design loads, a poor soil at shallow depth, There are different terms used to describe different types of deep foundations including the pile (which is analogous to a pole), the pier (which is analogous to a column), drilled shafts, and caissons. Piles are generally driven into the ground in situ, and can be made out of timber, steel, reinforced concrete or prestressed concrete.

=== Harbour, river and estuary structures ===
The most common type of harbour structure is the quay or marginal wharf intended for loading and unloading containers. Finger piers are commonly used for transfer of petroleum products, and trestle supports are provided for access to loading platforms and wharves.

Pile-supported structures consist of steel or concrete piles, driven into soft clays and sands of the seafloor, and usually carry a deck of reinforced concrete. The piles are spaced from 7 to 10 m apart for economy, with a load bearing capacity of 100 to 250 tons each.

Steel piles are either H-section or tubular, with diameters from 400 to 600 mm. Tubular piles are easier to protect from corrosion. Water depths for container and cargo ships are about 16 m, with a designed pile capacity of about 200 to 400 tons, so in most cases the pile length will be between 30 and 40 m. Larger container ships may need 20 m of water alongside, and may need piles of 40 to 50 m long to adequately support vertical crane load, and 1 m diameter for lateral stiffness. Petroleum terminals need more depth, usually about 23 m, so the piles are larger and more heavily loaded.

River structures include locks, low-level dams, overflow structures, and flood walls. Historically, these have usually been constructed behind sheet pile cofferdams to allow the worksite to be dewatered, so that conventional civil engineering construction methods can be used.

=== Coastal structures ===
- Mole (architecture)
- Seawall
- Causeway
- Dyke (embankment)
- Groyne

=== Offshore platforms ===
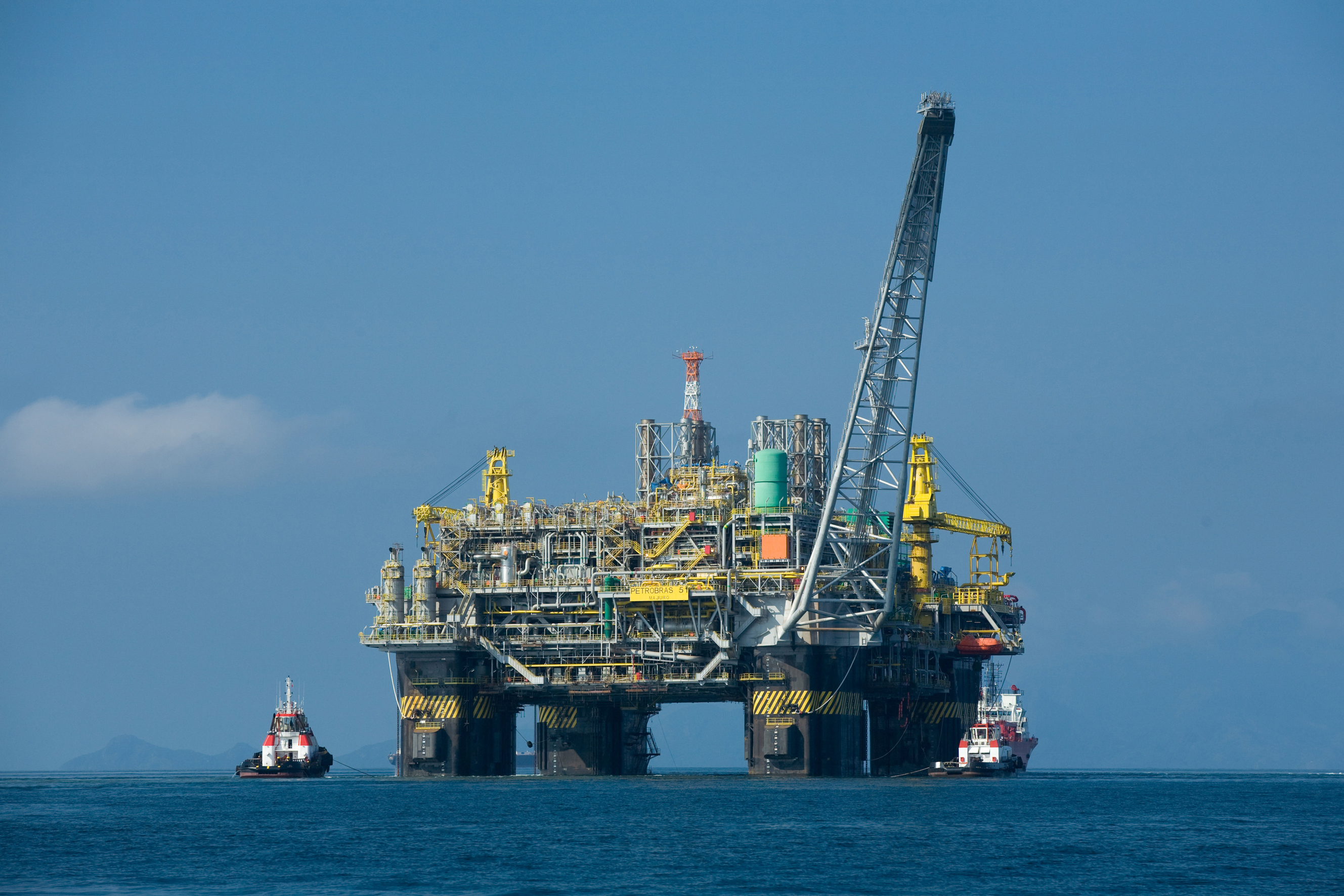
Oil platform P-51 off the Brazilian coast is a semi-submersible platform.

Diagram showing the operation of a typical oil platform: 1. Drilling rig; 2. Rock layers; 3. Oil rigs; 4. Oil and natural gas.

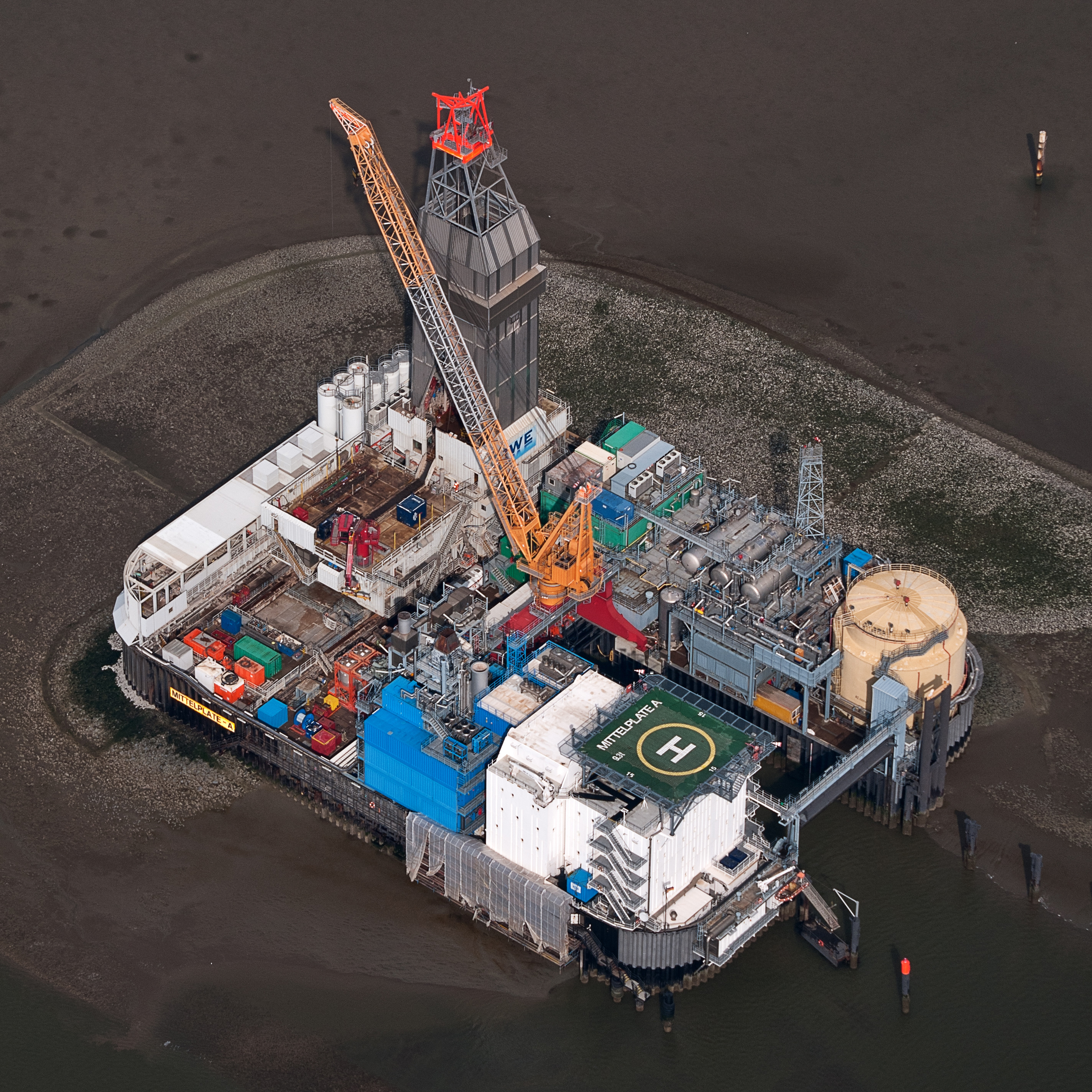
Oil platform Mittelplate in the North Sea

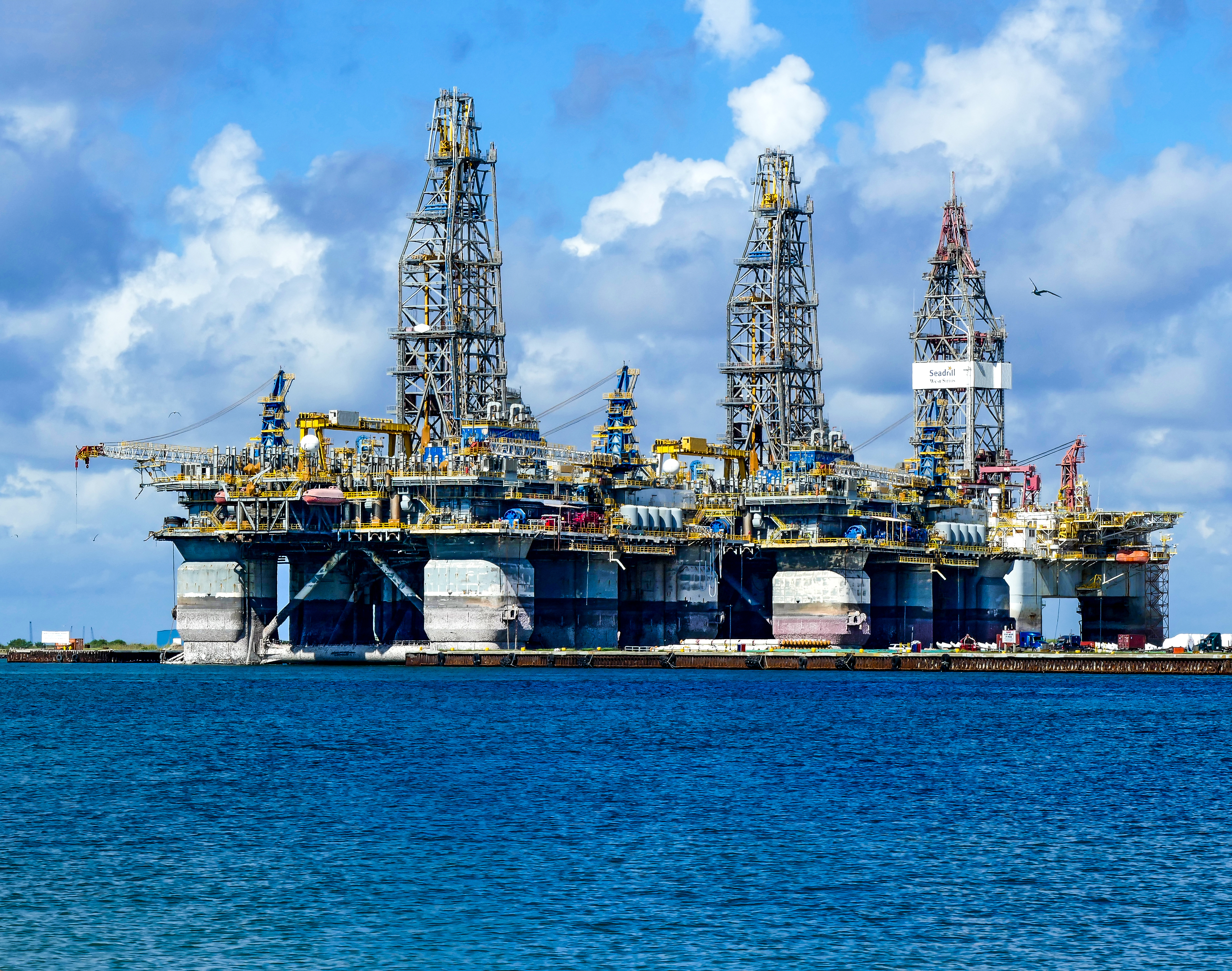
Refurbishment Station for Drilling Rigs – Corpus Christi Bay

An offshore platform is usually a large structure with facilities to extract and process petroleum and natural gas that lie in rock formations beneath the seabed. Many platforms also have facilities to accommodate the workers, although it is also common to have a separate accommodation platform bridge linked to the production platform. Most platforms engage in activities on the continental shelf, though they can also be used in lakes, inshore waters, and inland seas. Depending on the circumstances, the platform may be fixed to the ocean floor, consist of an artificial island, or float. In some arrangements the main facility may have storage facilities for the processed oil. Remote subsea wells may also be connected to a platform by flow lines and by umbilical connections. These sub-sea facilities may include of one or more subsea wells or manifold centres for multiple wells.

== Other applications ==
=== Submarine pipelines and cables ===
A submarine pipeline is a pipeline that is laid on the seabed or below it in a trench. Some of the pipeline may also be on land. Submarine pipelines are used primarily to carry oil or gas, but transportation of water is also important. A distinction is sometimes made between a flowline and a pipeline. The former is an intrafield pipeline, in the sense that it is used to connect subsea wellheads, manifolds and the platform within a particular development field. The latter, sometimes referred to as an export pipeline, is used to bring the resource to shore. Sizeable pipeline construction projects need to take into account many factors, such as the offshore ecology, geohazards and environmental loading.

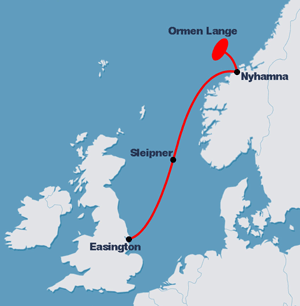
Example of a submarine pipeline route: the Langeled pipeline.

Submarine cable is communications or electrical power cable that is laid on or under the seabed.

== Removal and salvage ==
At the end of their useful working life, marine structures may need to be removed or rehabilitated.

== History ==
- Harbour construction in antiquity
- Dykes and land reclamation#History

== See also ==
- Ampelmann system – Offshore personnel transfer system
- Coastal engineering – Branch of civil engineering
- Commercial diving – Professional diving on industrial projects
- Dock – Human-made structure involved in the handling of boats or ships
- Land reclamation – Creating new land from oceans, seas, riverbeds or lakes
- Marine engineering – Engineering and design of shipboard systems
- Offshore concrete structure – Concrete structures used in offshore marine environments
- Offshore diving – Diving outside the territorial waters of a country
- Slipway – Shore ramp from which boats or ships can be lowered into or raised out of the water
- Types of concrete – Building material consisting of aggregates cemented by a binder
- Underwater construction – Industrial construction in an underwater environment
- Underwater environment – Aquatic or submarine environment
- Underwater survey – Inspection or measurement in or of an underwater environment
