= Underwater work =

Work done underwater during diving operations

Underwater work is work done underwater, generally by divers during diving operations, but includes work done underwater by remotely operated underwater vehicles and crewed submersibles.

Underwater work is the activity required to achieve the purpose of the diving operation additional to the activities required for safe diving in the specific underwater environment of the worksite, including finding and identifying the workplace, and where necessary, making it safe to do the planned work. Some of these activities have a wide range of applications in work suitable for a given diving mode, and are likely to be considered basic skills and learned during professional diver training programmes for the relevant mode. Others are specialist skils and are more likely to be learned on the job or on skills training programmes not directly related to diving.

== Occupational diving fields ==
There are several occupational specialty fields in occupational diving, and the work done in them may overlap.

- Aquaculture diving – Underwater diving in support of aquaculture installations
- Aquarium diving – Occupational diving in large aquariums
- Combat diving – Tactical military scuba diving
- Commercial offshore diving, also known as Offshore diving – Professional diving in support of the oil and gas industry
- Recreational dive guiding, also known as Dive leader – Underwater tour guide
- Diver training – Processes to develop the skills and knowledge to dive safely underwater
- Hazmat diving – Underwater diving in a known hazardous materials environment
- Media diving – Underwater diving in support of the media industries
- Nuclear diving – Diving in an environment where there is a risk of exposure to radioactive materials
- Pearl diving, also known as Pearl hunting – Collecting pearls from wild molluscs
- Police diving – A branch of professional diving carried out by police services
- Potable water diving – Underwater diving in potable water systems
- Public safety diving – Underwater work done by law enforcement, rescue and search and recovery teams
- Reconnaissance diving
- Rescue diving – Rescue of a distressed or incapacitated diver
- Salvage diving – Diving work associated with the recovery of vehicles, cargo and structures
- Sewer diving – Diving for maintenance work in sewers
- Scientific diving – Use of diving techniques in the pursuit of scientific knowledge
- Seaweed harvesting
- Shellfish harvesting (such as abalone, scallops, lobster)
- Ships husbandry diving – Diving related to the maintenance and upkeep of ships
- Sponge diving – Diving to gather natural sponges
- Underwater archaeology – Study of human activity via evidence found underwater
- Underwater construction diving, also known as Civil engineering diving, or "Civils" – Diving in support of underwater construction work
- Underwater demolition, also known as clearance diving – Deliberate destruction of underwater obstacles
- Underwater mineral extraction – Mining minerals from underwater

== Work skills commonly used in professional diving occupations ==
There are several kinds of skill that may be needed in underwater work by occupational divers in various fields, and are often learned during entry level training.

=== Underwater navigation ===
- Pilotage involves navigation by naturally observable landmarks and phenomena, such as sunlight, water movement, bottom composition (for example, sand ripples run parallel to the direction of the wave front, which tends to run parallel to the shore), bottom contour and noise. Although natural navigation is taught on courses, developing the skills is generally more a matter of experience.
- Compass navigation is a matter of training, practice and familiarity with the use of underwater compasses, combined with various techniques for reckoning distance underwater, including kick cycles (one complete upward and downward sweep of a kick), time, and occasionally by actual measurement, which may involve the length of umbilical deployed. Kick cycles depend on the diver's finning technique and equipment, but are generally more reliable than time, which is critically dependent on speed. Techniques for direct measurement also vary, from the use of calibrated distance lines or surveyor's tape measures, to a mechanism like an impeller log, to pacing off the distance along the bottom with the arms.
- Use of a guide line or jackstay. A guide line may be laid to facilitate navigation to and from the underwater workplace. This allows divers to travel to and from the workplace with minimal delay, even in poor visibility. A jackstay serves the same purpose in heavy duty format.

=== Underwater searches ===
Underwater searches are procedures to find a known or suspected target object or objects in a specified search area under water. They may be carried out underwater by divers, crewed submersibles, remotely operated underwater vehicles, or autonomous underwater vehicles, or from the surface by other agents, including surface vessels, aircraft and cadaver dogs.

A search method attempts to provide full coverage of the search area. This is greatly influenced by the width of the sweep which largely depends on the method used to detect the target. For divers in conditions of zero visibility this is as far as the diver can feel with his hands while proceeding along the pattern. When visibility is better, it depends on the distance at which the target can be seen from the pattern, or detected by sonar or magnetic field anomalies. In all cases the search pattern should completely cover the search area without excessive redundancy or missed areas. Overlap is needed to compensate for inaccuracy and sensor error, and may be necessary to avoid gaps in some patterns.

- Diver searches:
  - Circular search – Procedure for finding underwater targets
  - Pendulum search – Diver search pattern
  - Jackstay search – Underwater search along a laid down line
    - Snag-line search – Use of a taut line towed across the search area to catch on the target
  - Compass search – Search patterns controlled by compass directions
    - Spiral box search
    - Compass grid search
    - Ladder search
    - Swim-line search
  - Directed search – Underwater search directed from the surface
  - Towed search
  - Searches using hand held submersible sonar transponders
  - Current drift search
  - Depth contour search
- Searches by submersibles, remotely operated vehicles and autonomous underwater vehicles
- Searches by surface vessels
- Searches by aircraft
- Searches from the shore

=== Rigging and lifting ===
Most underwater rigging uses equipment and techniques common to rigging in other environments, except for the common use of buoyant lifting underwater, and the equipment designed and used specifically for that purpose.

- Basic ropework, knots and splices, tackle
- Rigging slings cargo nets and spreaders, lifting hooks and shackles
- Lifting bags (variable buoyancy lifting equipment)
- Chain blocks, tirfors and pullers

=== Inspection, measuring and recording ===
- Underwater photography – Genre of photography
- Underwater videography – Electronic underwater photography concerned with capturing moving images
- Surveyor's measuring tape – Flexible ruler used to measure size or distance
- Vernier calipers – Moderate precision linear measuring tool
- Spirit level – Tool to indicate whether a surface is level or plumb
- Clinometer – Instrument to measure the inclination of a surface relative to local gravity
- Compass – Instrument used for navigation and orientation

=== Use of basic hand tools ===
- Hacksaws
- Hammers
- Cold chisels
- Pliers
- levers, wedges and crowbars
- Screwdrivers and wrenches
- Pipecutters and bolt cutters

== Underwater inspection ==
Inspection of underwater structures, installations, and sites is a common diving activity, applicable to planning, installation, and maintenance phases, but the required skills are often specific to the application. Much use is made of video and still photographic evidence, and live video to allow direction of the inspection work by the supervisor and topside specialists. Inspections may also involve surface preparation, often by cleaning, and non-destructive testing. Tactile inspection may be appropriate where visibility is poor.

== Typed of underwater work and the related specialist occupations ==
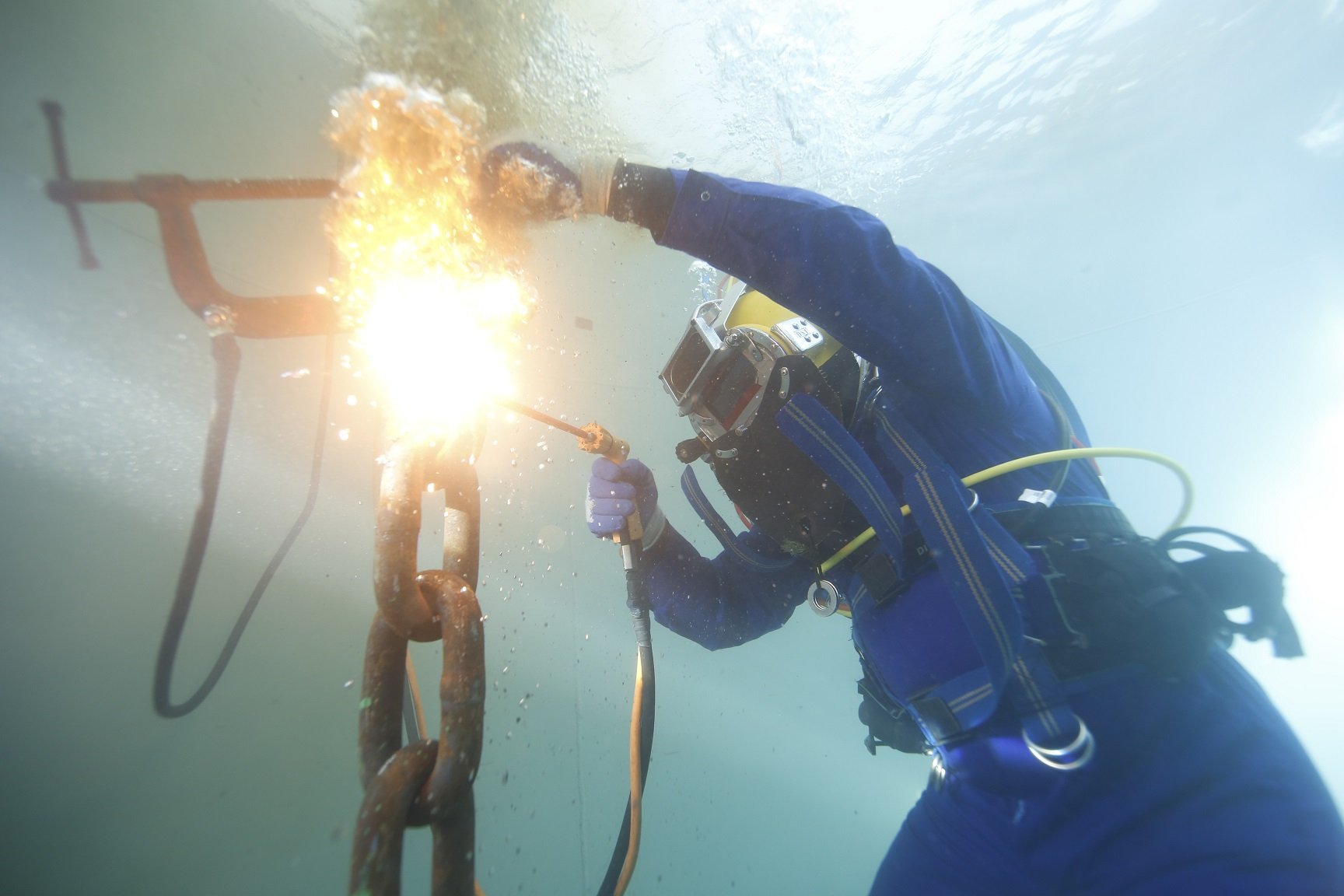
Underwater oxy-arc cutting

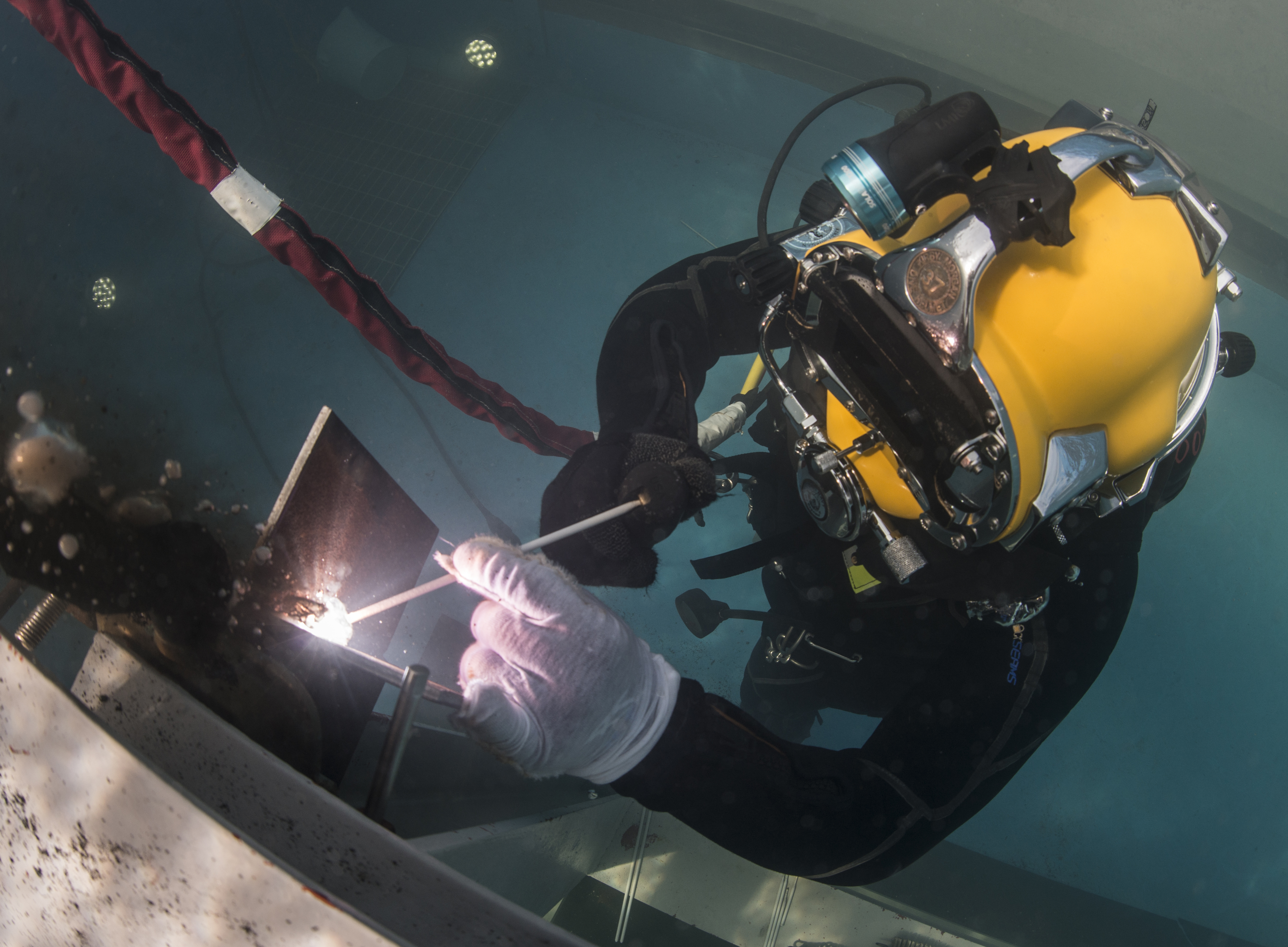
Underwater fillet weld in a training pool

- Erecting formwork (shuttering) and reinforcing steel for casting concrete. (civils)
- Underwater concrete placement using a tremie, concrete pump, skip, bagwork or toggle bags (civils)
- Oxy-arc cutting (salvage, ships husbandry, offshore)
- Underwater welding (salvage, ships husbandry, offshore)
- Use of pneumatic and hydraulic power tools (ships husbandry, civils, offshore, salvage}
- High pressure jetting (ships husbandry, civils, offshore)
- Hydraulic bolt-tensioning (offshore oil and gas)
- Fitting and maintenance of wellhead components (offshore oil and gas)
- Hull cleaning and inspection (ships husbandry)
- Mooring inspection and maintenance (ships husbandry, offshore)
- Pipeline inspection (offshore oil and gas)
- Propeller polishing (ships husbandry)
- Inspection and replacement of cathodic protection anodes (ships husbandry, offshore)
- Underwater demolition (clearance, civils)
- Bomb disposal (military, public safety)
- Archaeological excavation (archaeology)
- Search and recovery (public safety)
- Forensic evidence collection and preservation (police)
- Search and rescue (public safety, police)
- Site surveys and mapping (scientific, archaeology)
- Biological sampling and tagging (scientific)
- Geological and chemical sampling and specimen collection (scientific).
- Core drilling (scientific)
- Setting up and recovery of instrumentation (scientific)
- Transect and quadrat surveys (scientific)
- Photography and videography (media, scientific, archaeology, inspection)

== Gallery ==
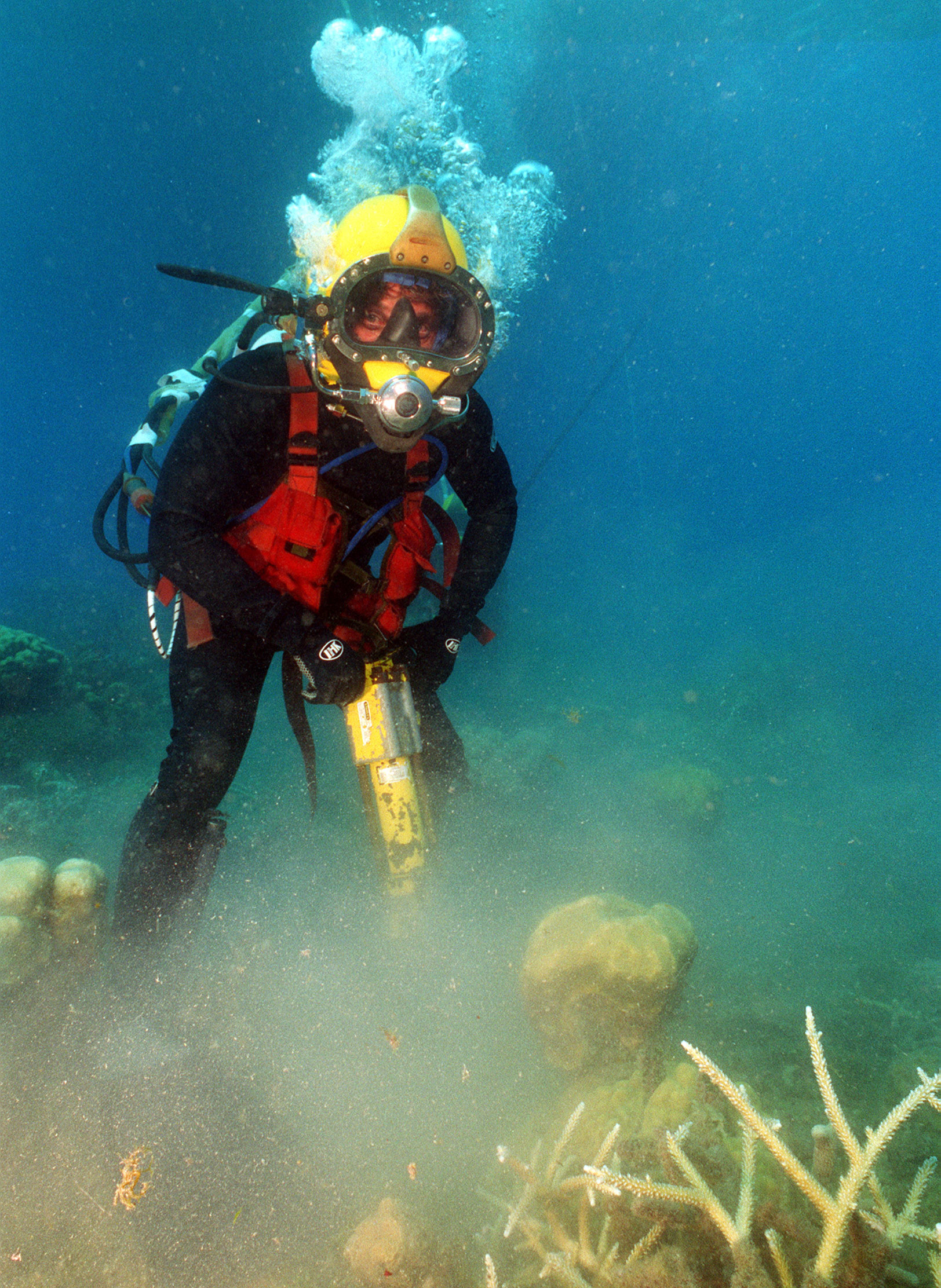
Underwater construction training

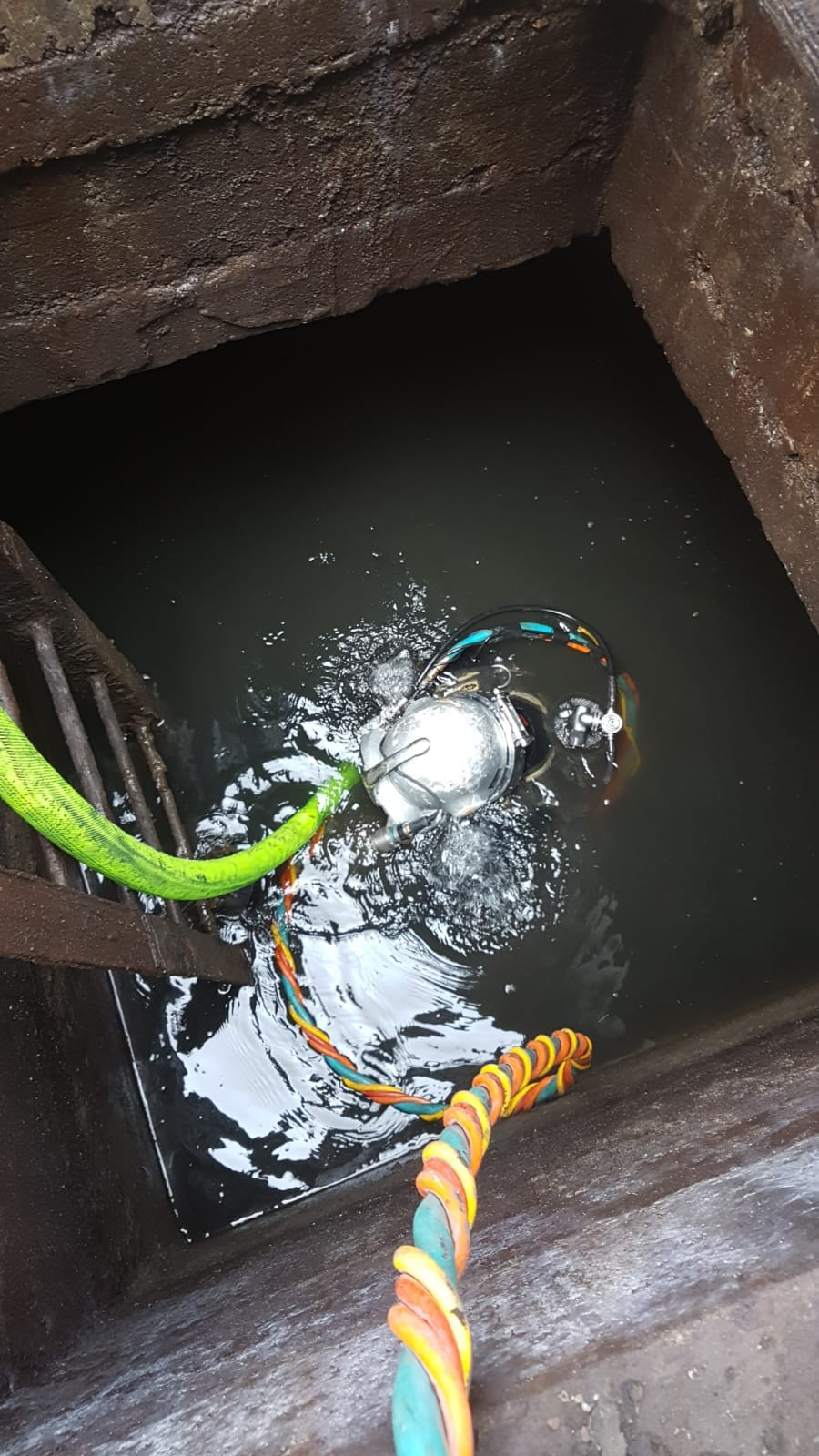
Industrial inspection

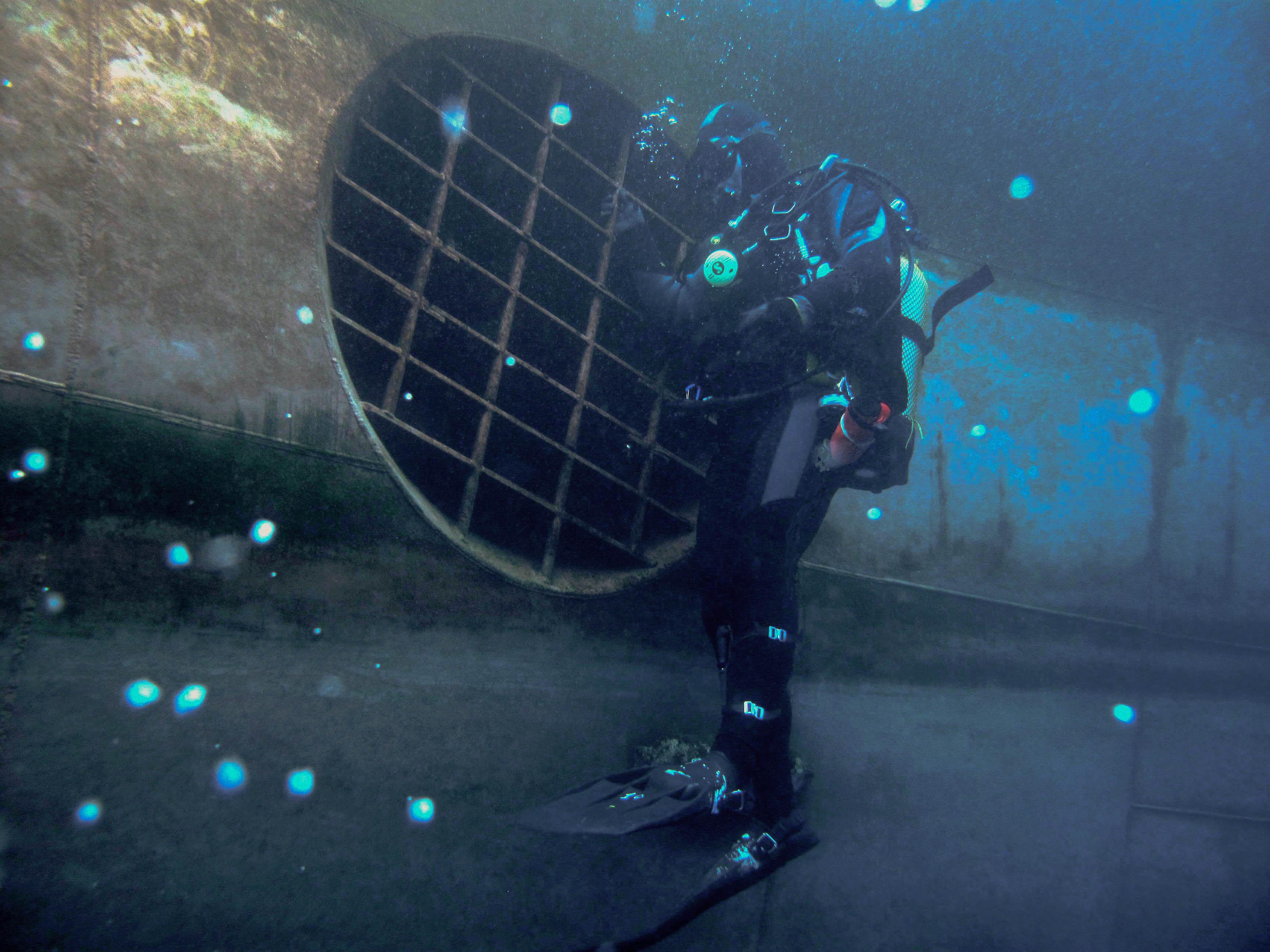
Inspecting a thruster grating

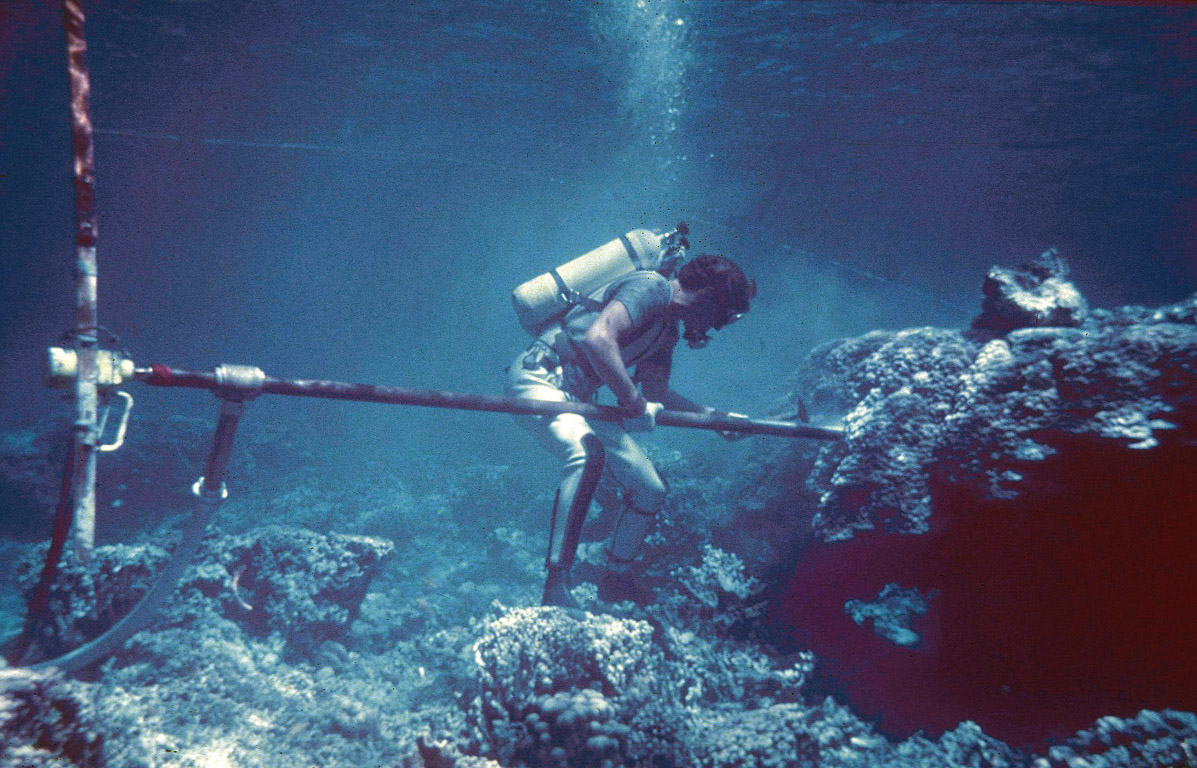
Core-drilling coral

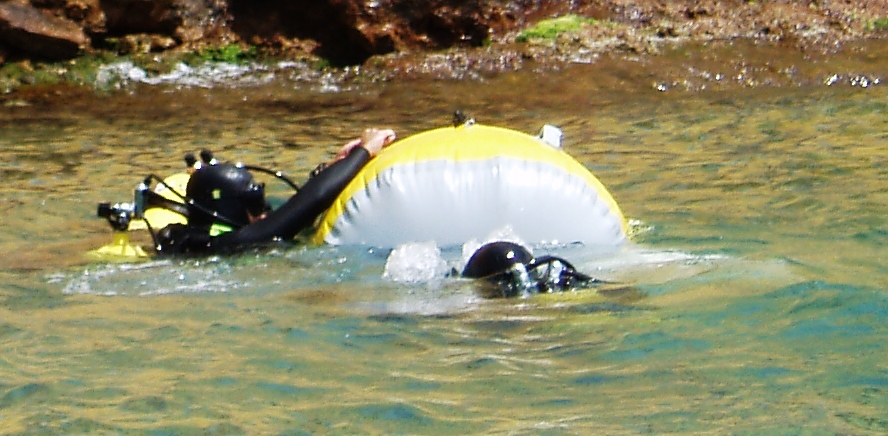
Lifting bags

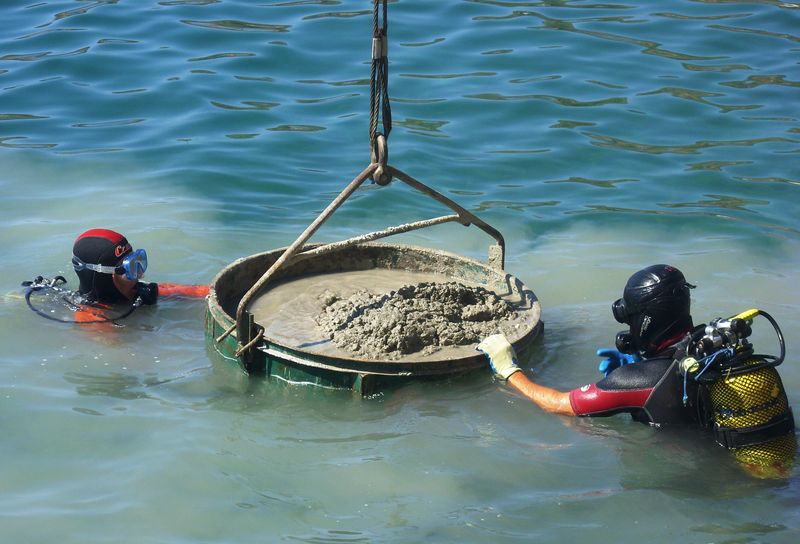
Placing concrete underwater

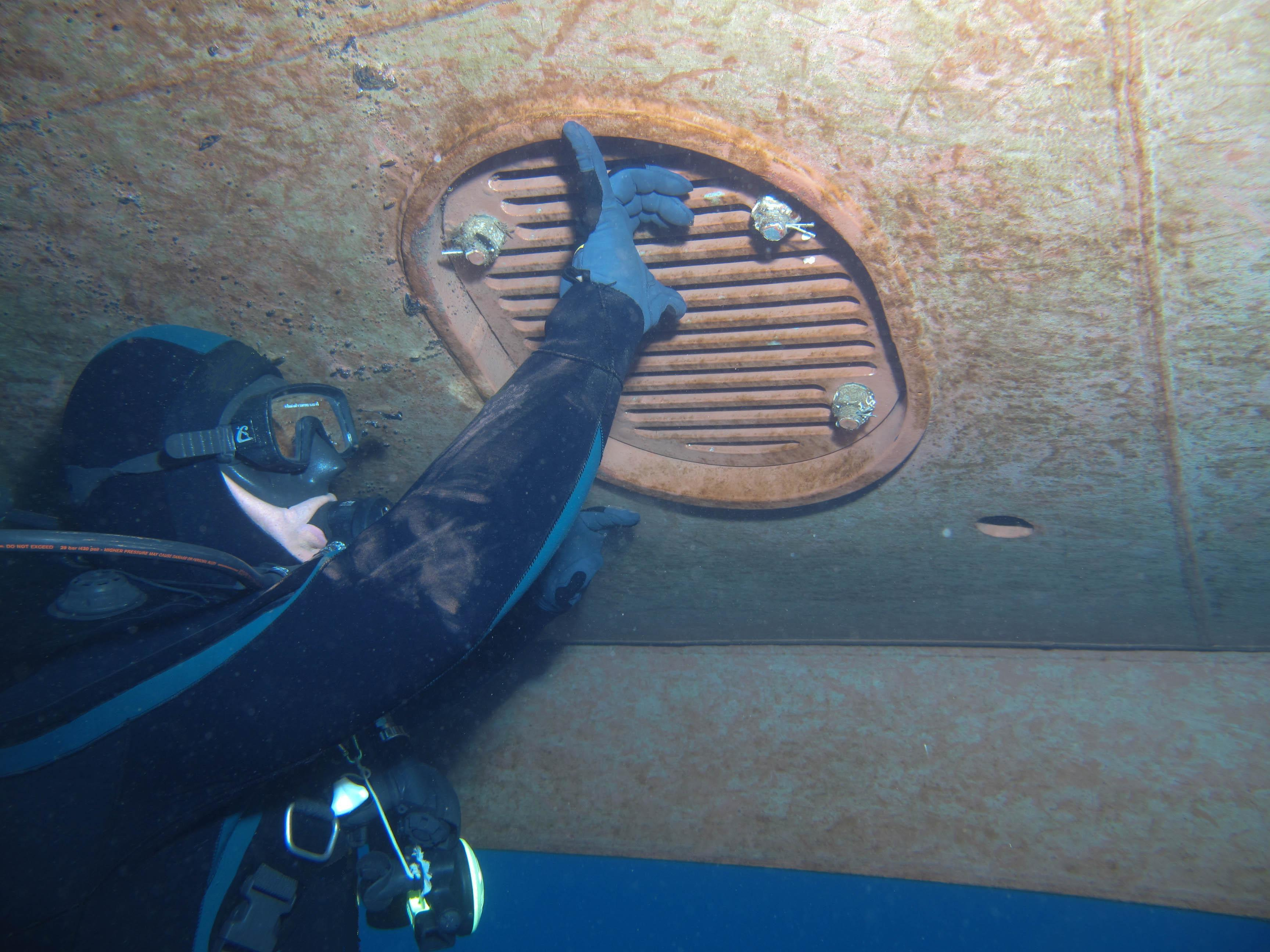
Inspecting an intake grating

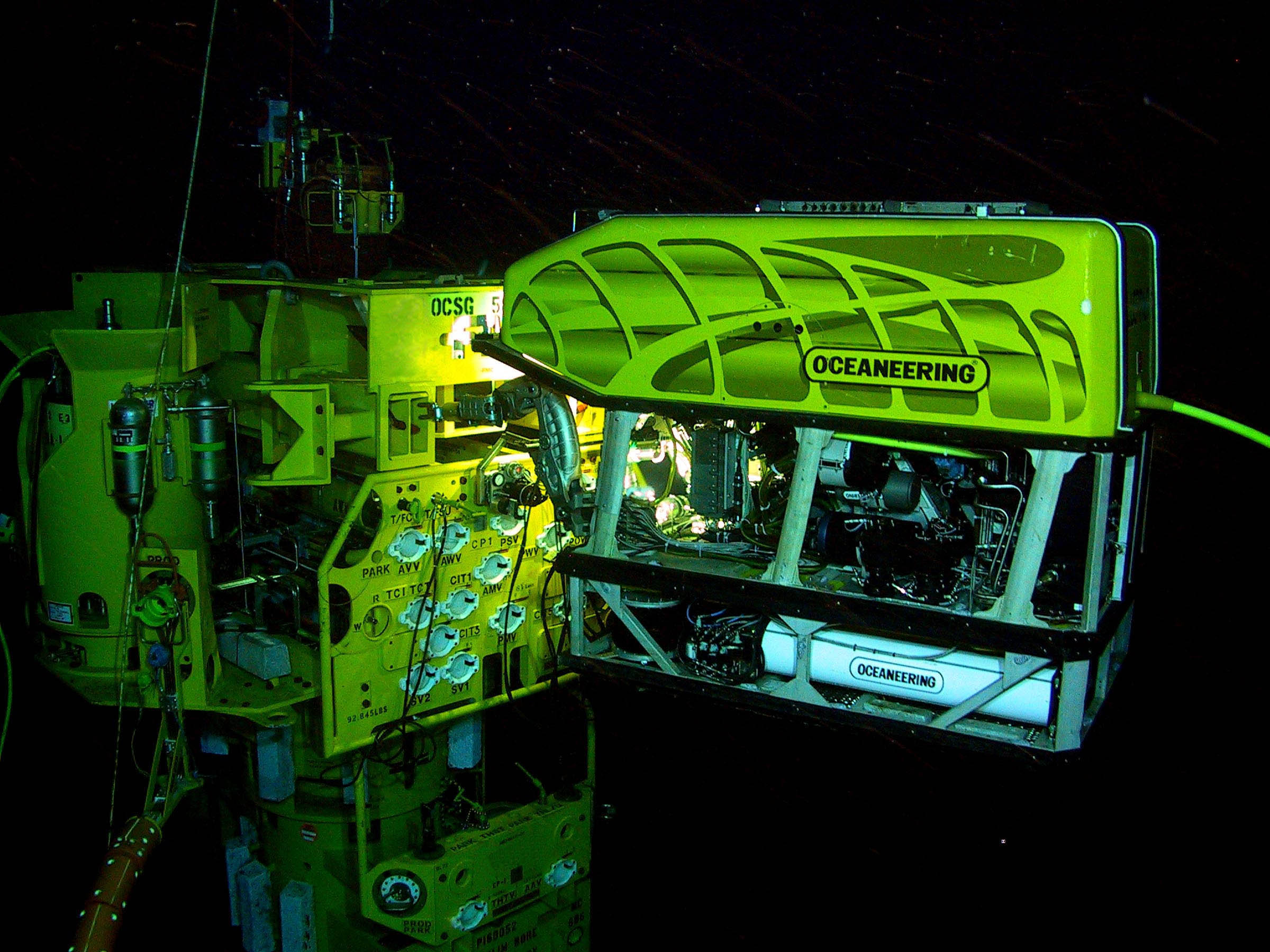
ROV working on a subsea structure

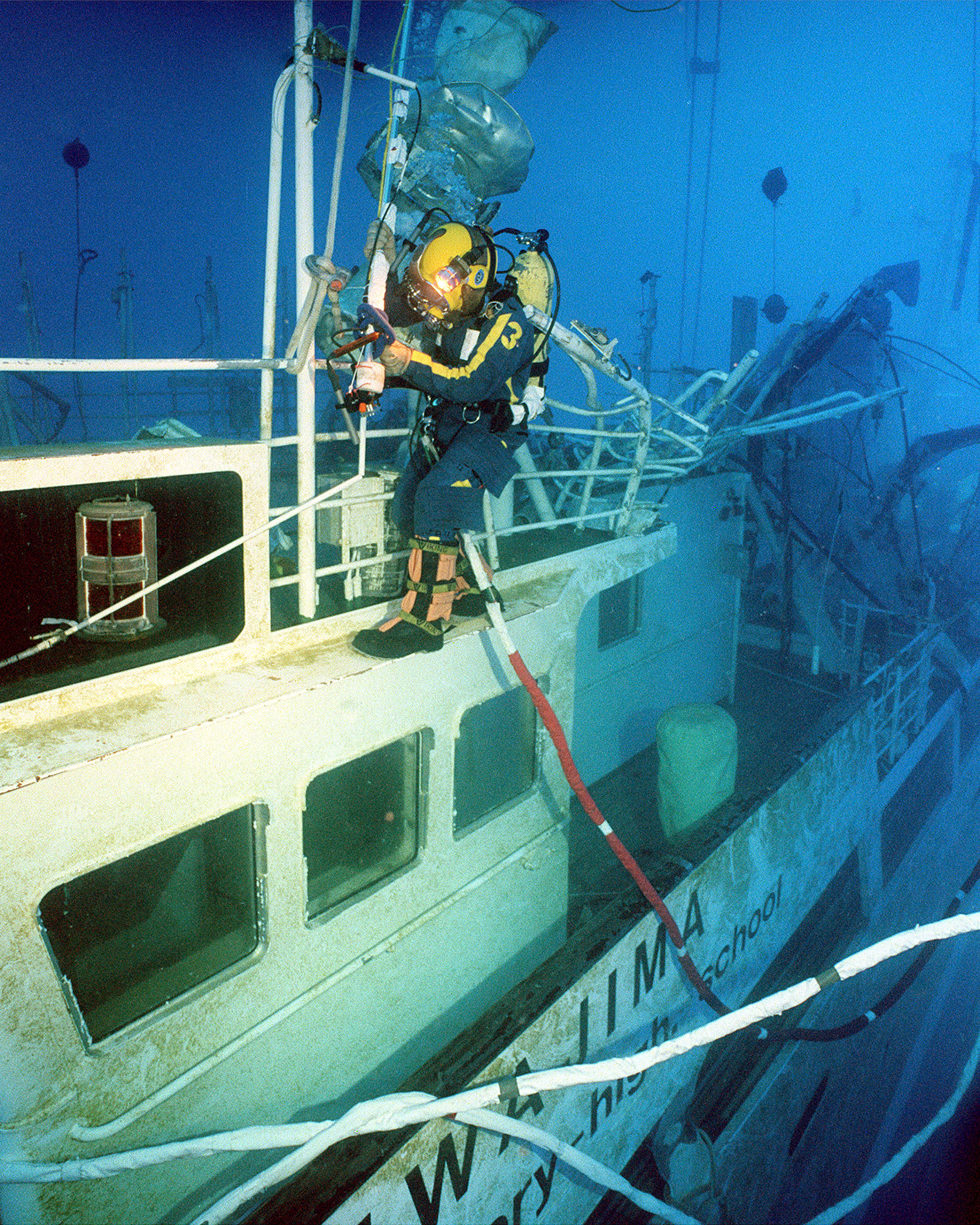
Salvage work

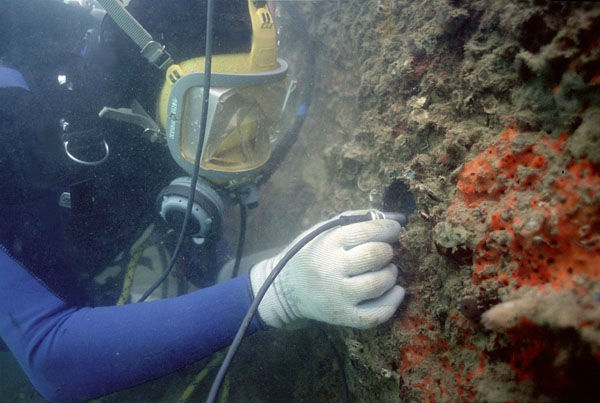
Ultrasonic testing

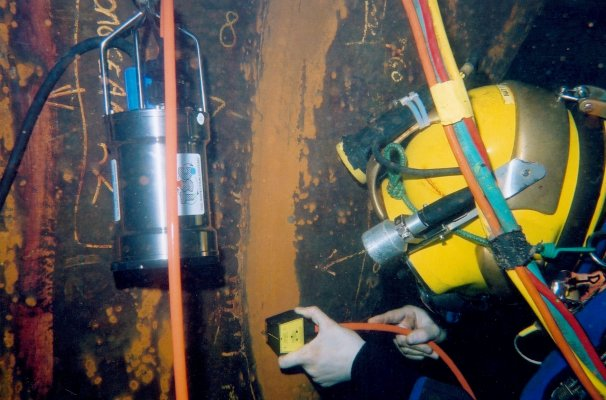
Non-destructive testing by measuring electrical current

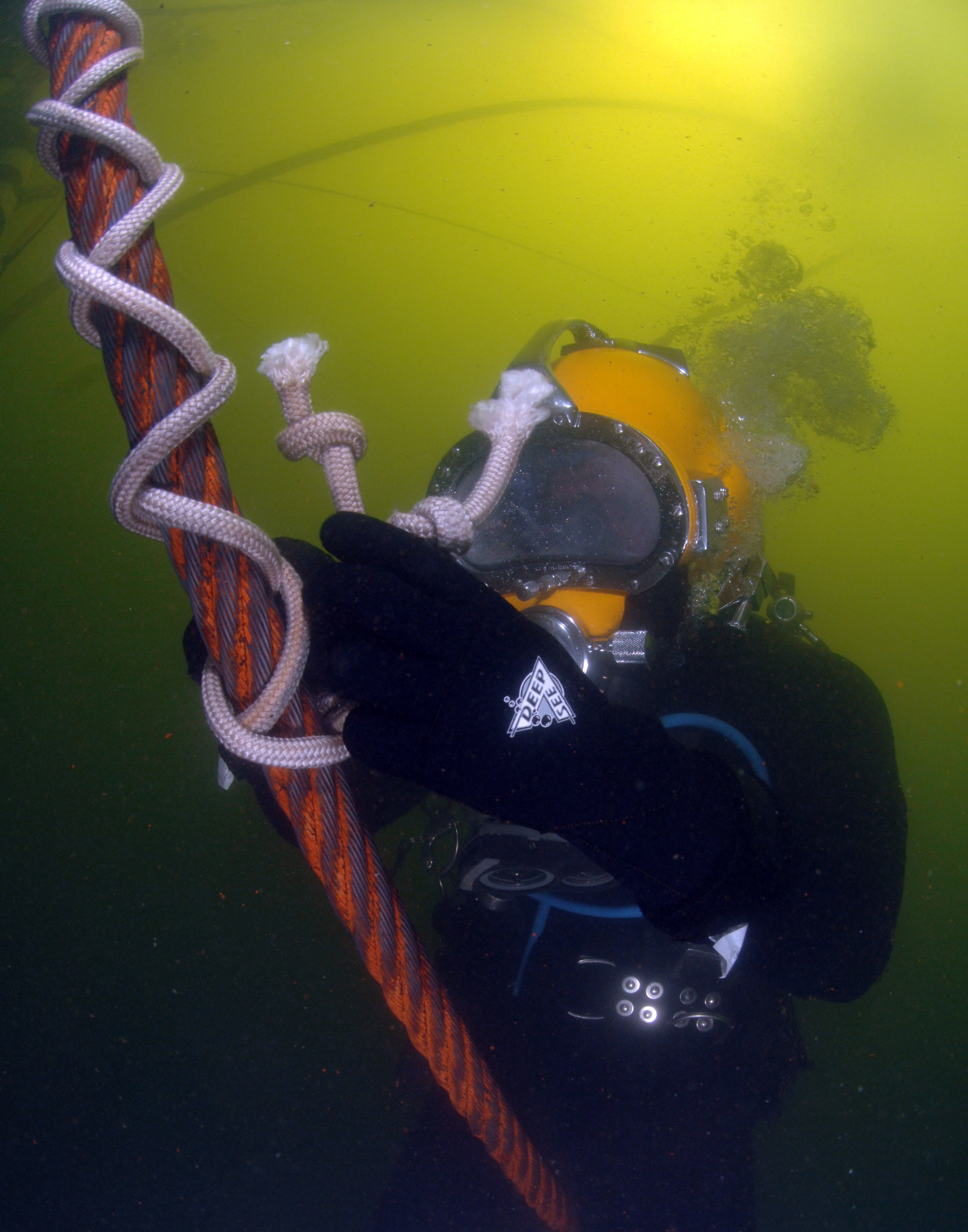
Rigging

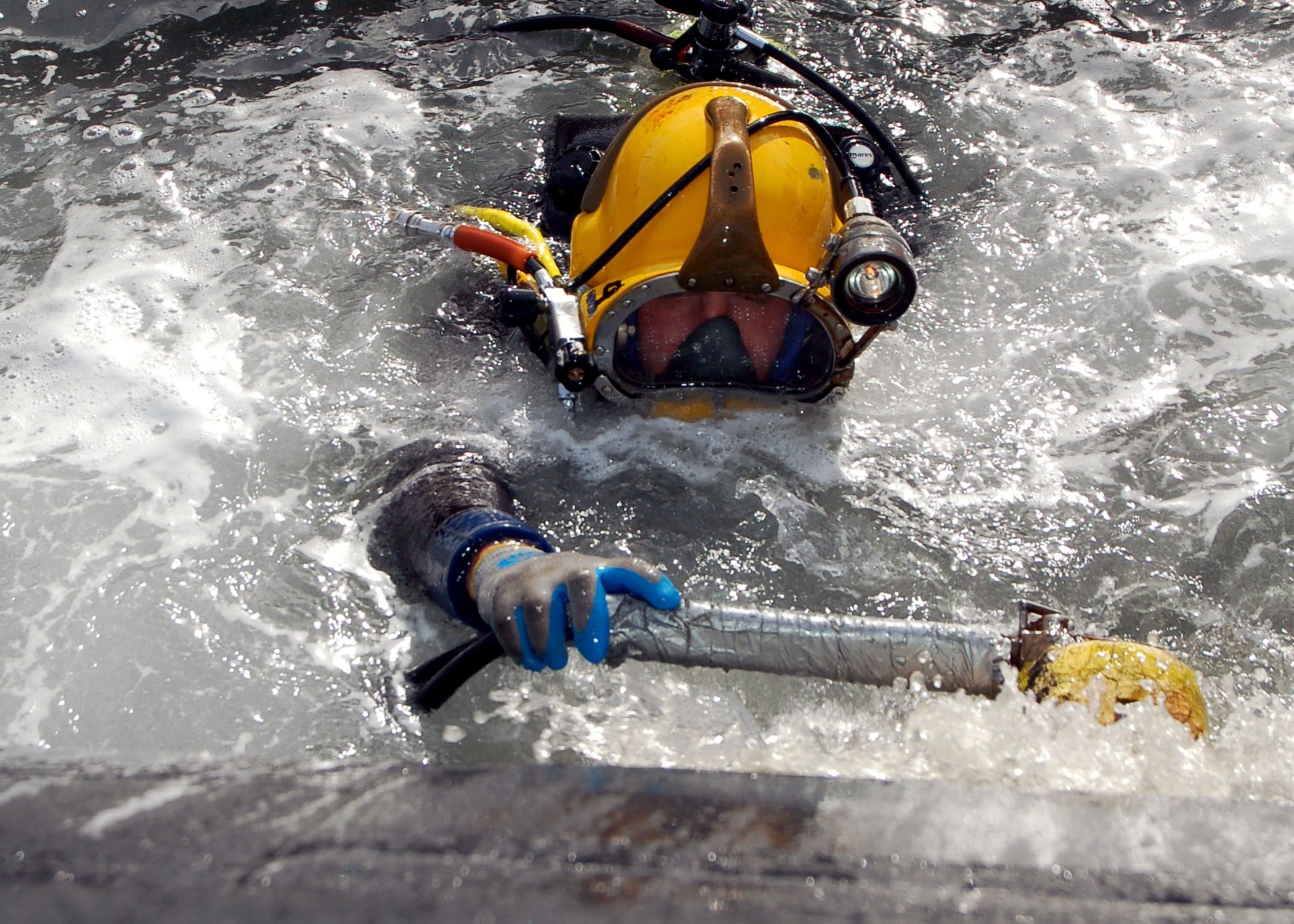
Hull scrubbing

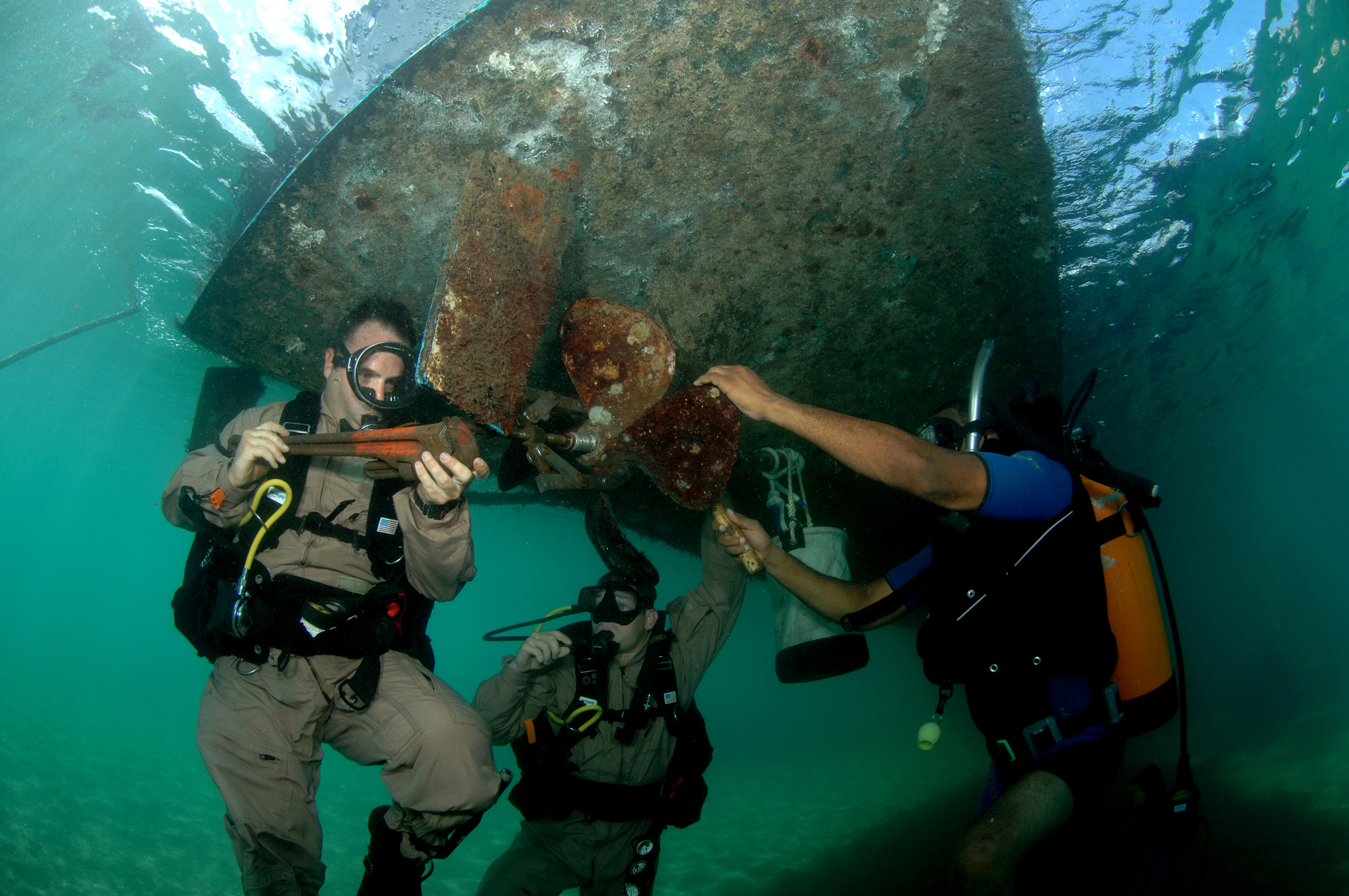
Removing a small propeller

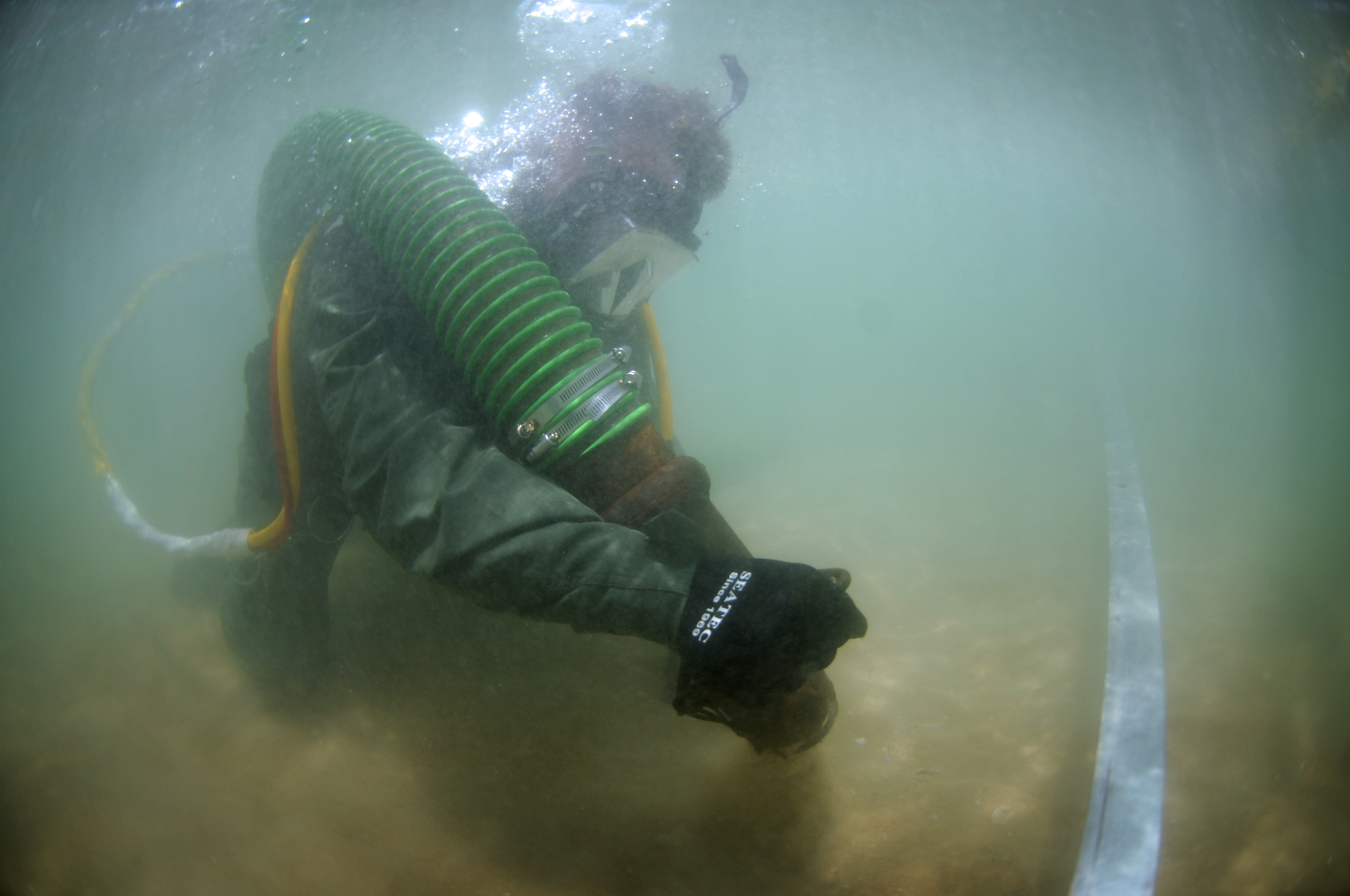
Removing sediment with a suction pump

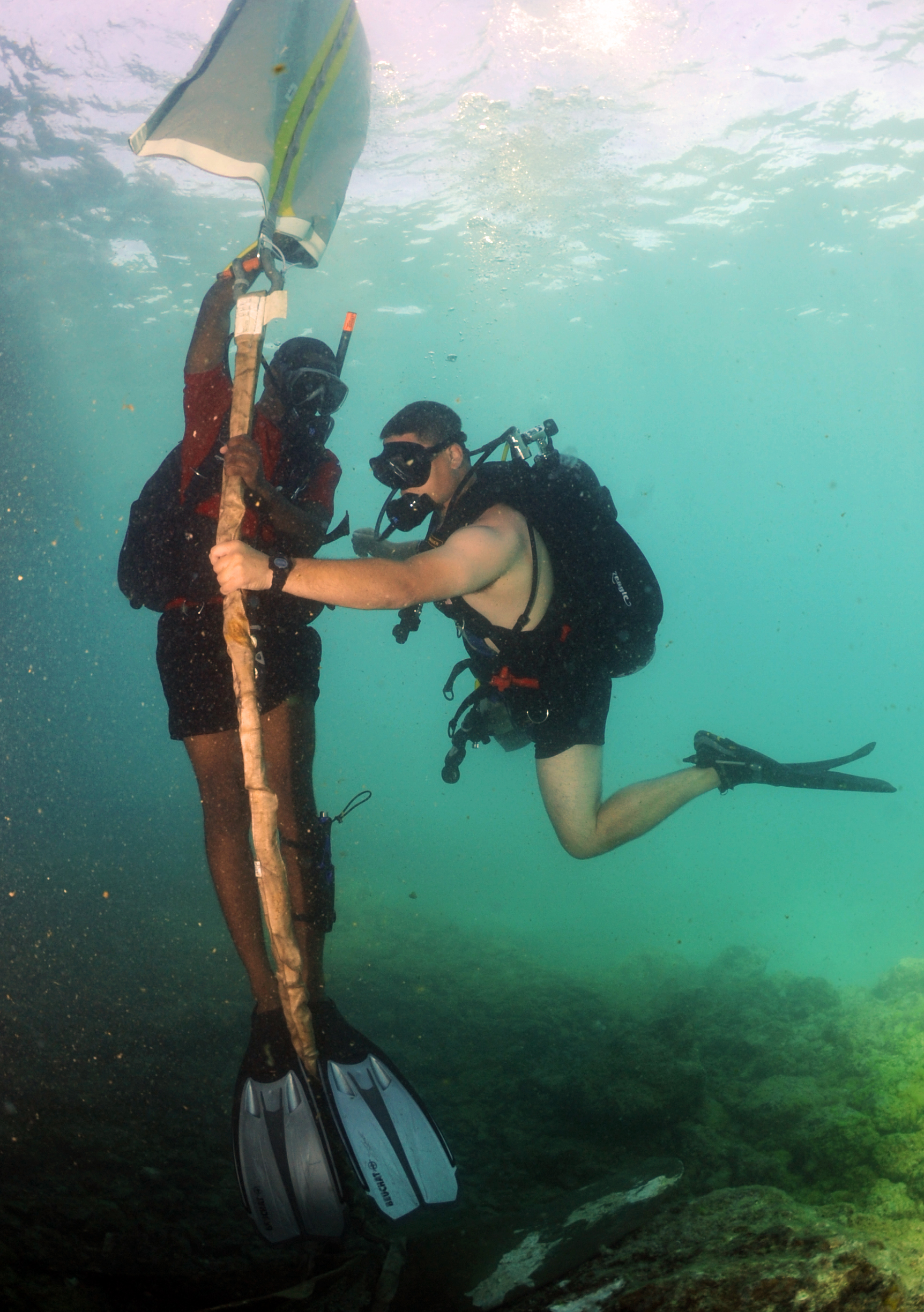
Filling a lift bag
