= Reasonable =

Reasonable may refer to:

- Reason, the capacity for rational thinking
- Reasonable accommodation, An adjustment made in a system to accommodate an individual's need
- Reasonable and non-discriminatory licensing, a licensing requirement set by standards organizations
- Reasonable Blackman, a silk weaver in sixteenth-century England
- Reasonable doubt, a legal standard of proof in most adversarial criminal systems
- Reasonable person, a person who exercises care, skill, and appropriate judgment
  - Reasonableness, the quality of a government action that is reasonable
  - Subjective and objective standard of reasonableness, legal standards of reasonableness
- Reasonable person model, a psychological model of environments/actions that foster reasonableness
- Reasonable suspicion, a legal standard of proof in United States law
- Reasonable time, amount of time which is in fairness necessary to do something

== See also ==
- Reason (disambiguation)
- Reasonable doubt (disambiguation)
