= Reason (disambiguation) =

Reason is the analytic faculty of the human mind that maintains objectivity unto inspecting and organizing perceptions.

Reason may also refer to:

- The cause of something
- Rationality, the quality or state of being reasonable, based on facts or reason
- Reason (argument), a factor which justifies or explains

== Computing ==
- Reason (programming language), an alternative OCaml syntax and toolchain created at Facebook
- Reason (software), a digital audio workstation

== Literature ==
- Reason (magazine), a monthly libertarian magazine published by the Reason Foundation
- "Reason" (short story), a 1941 science fiction short story by Isaac Asimov
- Reason: Why Liberals Will Win the Battle for America, a 2010 book by Robert Reich
- Reason: the Only Oracle of Man, a 1785 book by Ethan Allen
- Reason, a fictional weapon system from Neal Stephenson's novel Snow Crash

== Music ==
=== People ===
- Reason (American rapper), an American hip hop artist
- Reason (Australian rapper), an Australian hip hop artist
- Reason (British rapper) (born 1970), a British hip hop artist, former member of Love City Groove
- Reason (South African rapper), a South African rapper

=== Albums and EPs ===
- Reason (The Fray EP), a 2003 EP by The Fray
- Reason (Melanie C album), a 2003 album by singer Melanie C
- Reason (Monsta X EP), a 2023 EP by Monsta X
- Reason (Officium Triste album), a 2004 album by doom metal band Officium Triste
- Reason (Selah Sue album), 2015
- Reason (Shaman album), a 2005 album by Brazilian power metal band Shamaan
- Reason (Violent Apathy album), 1995

=== Songs ===
- "Reason", a 2004 song by American rapper Nas from Street's Disciple
- "Reason", a 2004 song by German dance act Diamond, re-released in 2015 as Cascada
- "Reason", a 2018 song by South Korean singer Song I-han
- "Reason", a 2021 song by Indian rapper and singer Abhi the Nomad, from Abhi vs the Universe
- "Reason", a 2023 song by South Korean girl group Dreamcatcher
- "Reason", a bonus track on the Cranberries' album Everybody Else Is Doing It, So Why Can't We?
- Reason (Nami Tamaki song), a 2004 song by Nami Tamaki
- Reason (No Angels song), a 2003 song by German pop band No Angels
- Reason (Yuzu song) a 2012 song by Yuzu

== Other ==
- The Reason Foundation, a public policy think tank based in Los Angeles, California, U.S.
- Order of the Reason, a medieval military order native to Spain
- Reason (surname)
- Radar for Europa Assessment and Sounding: Ocean to Near-surface (REASON), a radar system on board NASA's Europa Clipper mission to Jupiter's moon Europa
- Reason Australia, a political party in Australia

== See also ==
- Age of reason (disambiguation)
- No Reason (disambiguation)
- Reasons (disambiguation)
- The Reason (disambiguation)
