= The Reason =

The Reason may refer to:

- The Reason (Hoobastank album)
  - "The Reason" (Hoobastank song)
- "The Reason" (Celine Dion song)
- The Reason (Beanie Sigel album)
- The Reason (Diamond Rio album)
- The Reason (Lemar album)
- The Reason (X Ambassadors EP)
- The Reason (band)
- "The Reason", a song by the Blizzards, from Domino Effect (album)
- "The Reason", a song by Lower Than Atlantis from Lower Than Atlantis (album)
- "The Reason", a song by Skrillex on Leaving (EP) (2013)

== See also ==
- Reason (disambiguation)
