= Reasons (disambiguation) =

Reasons may also refer to:

- Reasons (argument), considerations which count in favor of an argument's conclusion or a belief
- Reasons (Angelit album), 2003
- Reasons, a 1996 film starring LisaRaye McCoy
- "Reasons" (Earth, Wind & Fire song), 1975
- "Reasons" (John Farnham song), 1986
- "Reasons", a 1994 song by Built to Spill from There's Nothing Wrong with Love
- "Reasons", a 1984 song by Chris Rea from Wired to the Moon
- "Reasons", a 2004 song by Kotipelto from Coldness
- "Reasons", a 2009 song by New Found Glory from Not Without a Fight
- "Reasons", a 1973 song by Roger Daltrey from Daltrey
- "Reasons", a 2020 song by San Cisco from Flaws
- "Reasons", a 2005 song by UB40 from Who You Fighting For?
- Gary Reasons, former NFL linebacker

== See also ==
- Reason (disambiguation)
