= Jacques Francis =

African salvage diver (born c. 1527)

- Born: c. 1527; Arguin Island, Mauritania
- Other name: Jaques Frauncys
- Occupation: Salvage diver
- Years active: 1546–48
- Known for: Being the first African to give evidence before a court in England

Jacques Francis, also known as Jaques Frauncys, (c. 1527 – after February 1548) was an African salvage diver who led the expedition to salvage King Henry VIII's guns from the Mary Rose. He was the first African to give evidence in 1548 before a court. He was accused of being a "slave" and an "infidel" in an attempt to discredit his evidence, but he was paid wages so he was not a slave and furthermore, "slaves were not allowed to give evidence in court".

== Origins ==
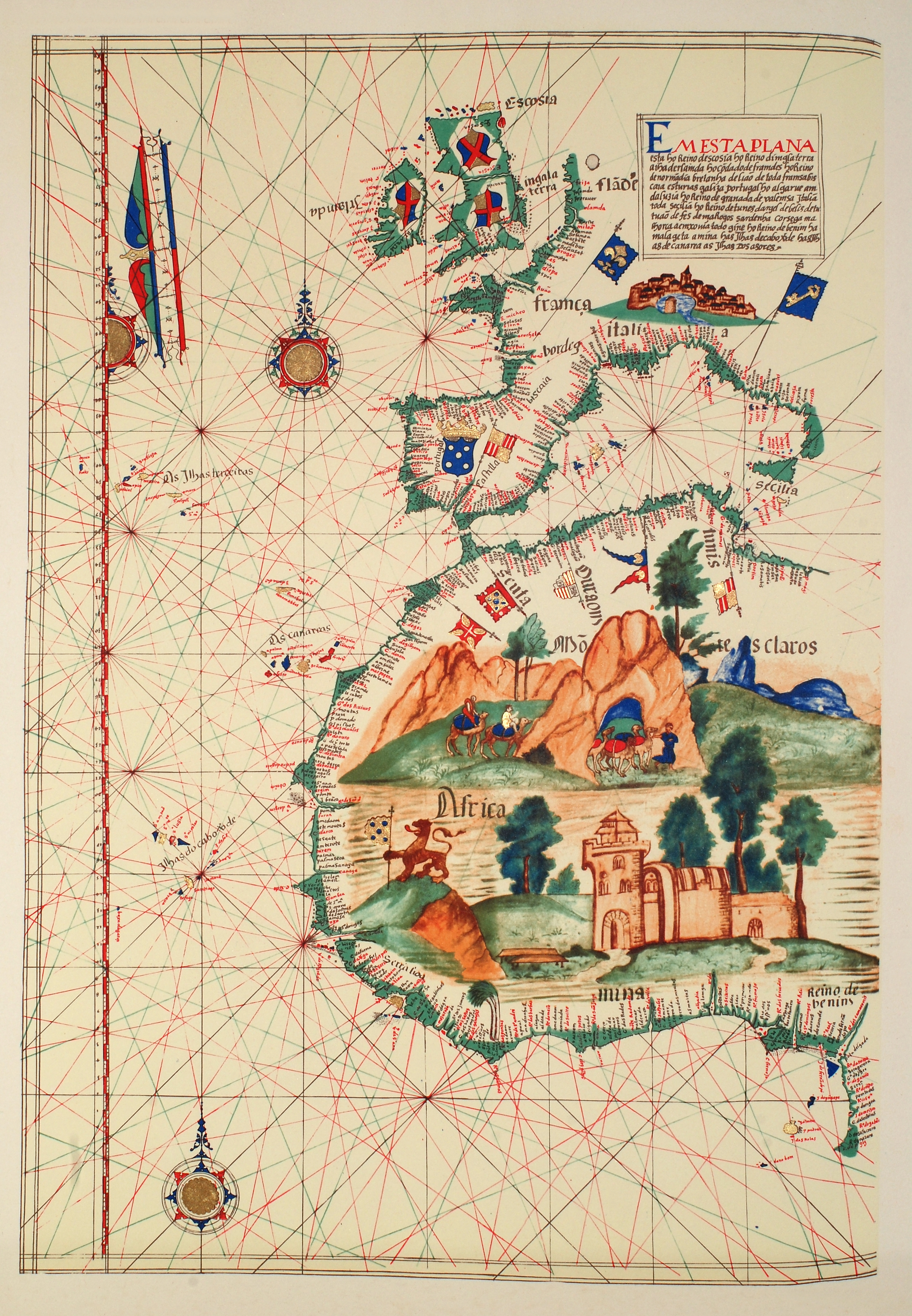
1563 Portuguese portolan chart: southeast of Fernando Pó; along the West African coast the Cape Verde islands and farther north Arguin Island; at the top the British Isles with Southampton in the southwest.

Jacques Francis was born around 1527 or 1528. He stated during the trial at which he testified that he was 20 years old in 1548. His family origins are unknown. He claimed to be from the "Island of Guinea." This term could refer to most islands off the coast of West Africa, from the Cape Verde islands to Fernando Pó. However, it most likely refers to the island of Arguin, where the Portuguese had established one of their first trading posts (feitoria), an area referred to as "Guinea" by the English. The waters around Arguin, notoriously dangerous for navigation, were the site of frequent shipwrecks. He may also have been a pearl diver. What is certain is that such skills are acquired only after years of training to master breath-holding and depth.

Jacques Francis's swimming and diving skills were all the more important and essential because of the highly ambivalent attitude towards swimming in Britain at the time. The English, like other humans, struggled to resist the temptation to bathe, but the question of learning to swim remained a subject of debate. On one hand, learning to swim could prevent drowning; on the other, it was thought to increase the risk of drowning according to the adage that a person who knows how to swim is more tempted to take risks. In 1571, the vice-chancellor of the University of Cambridge, John Whitgift, even issued a regulation prohibiting members of the university (both students and teachers) from bathing, swimming, or entering any body of water, under penalty of flogging for a first offense and expulsion for a repeat offense.

During the 1548 trial, Jacques Francis stated that he entered the service of Piero Paolo Corsi two years earlier, around 1546. It is likely that when Corsi obtained the contract to salvage the Mary Rose that year, he sought to recruit a qualified diver—Jacques Francis, in this case. His journey between leaving Arguin and arriving in Britain and Southampton is difficult to trace. Various hypotheses can be put forward. His employer, Piero Paolo Corsi, may have directly recruited him in Africa or used a Portuguese intermediary. He might also have recruited him in Venice itself or elsewhere in the Italian peninsula, where the population of African origin was significant. Most Africans working in Italy had been imported by Portuguese merchants active since the 1440s, often with Italian financing. However, not all were slaves, especially those with significant qualifications. Gustav Ungerer, in his 2005 article, suggests instead that Corsi may have purchased Francis from an Italian merchant in Southampton itself.

== The Mary Rose ==
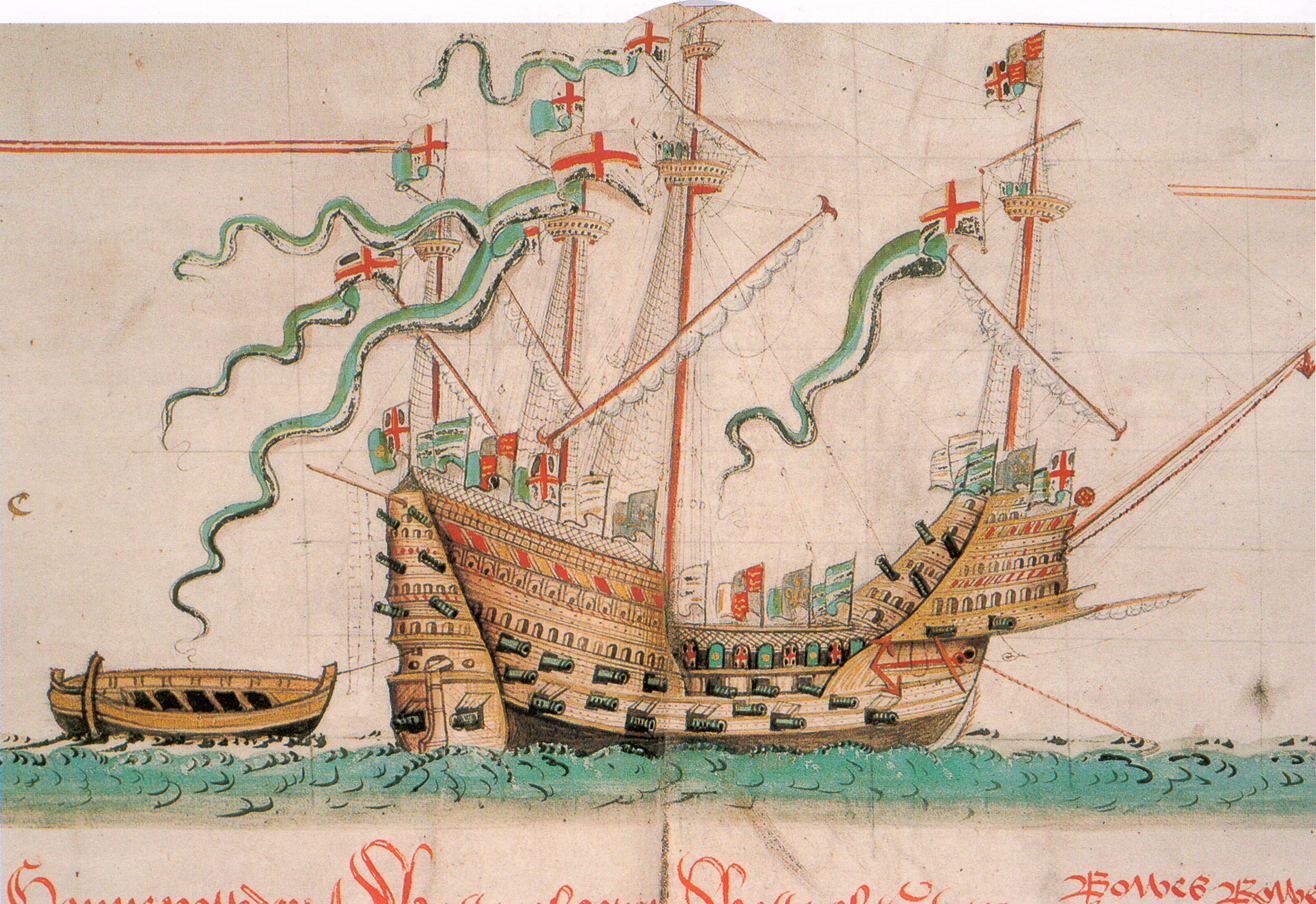
The Mary Rose as depicted in the Anthony Roll.

The Venetian Piero Paolo Corsi was part of a significant community of Italian merchants (primarily Venetians, Genoese, and Florentines) long established in English ports. Corsi had arrived in Southampton around 1539. The port was then in decline compared to London, and most Italian merchants had even left for the English capital. Relations among those still based in Southampton were marked by fierce competition. It appears that upon his arrival in the port, Corsi contacted the city's Italian merchants to offer the services of his wreck divers.

In July 1545, during the Battle of the Solent, the Mary Rose, the flagship of Admiral George Carew, took on water through its open gunports and sank in about ten meters of water, for reasons not entirely determined (combat or a mishap). While the ship itself was of great value, that of its cannons was enormous, to the point that recovering them could justify the expenses incurred.

In August 1545, a first recovery attempt, involving around thirty Venetians and sixty English sailors, led by Piero de Andreasi and Simone de Marini, had failed. In 1546 the Admiralty contracted Corsi, hired Piero Paolo Corsi to recover the most important items (primarily the cannons) from the wreck. Corsi, being less ambitious, employed a total of only eight men, including Jacques Francis. He described him as originating from "Guinea" and, above all, as his best diver. Jacques Francis led his own team of four divers, at least two of whom, John Ito and George Blake (or Blacke), were also of African origin.

However, the operations proved more complicated than expected. In 1547, the Admiralty, with the agreement of the Privy Council, paid Corsi, according to sources, £37, 11 shillings, and 5 pence for an initial recovery of anchors and various other objects, or an initial payment of £20 followed by £57, 11 shillings, and 5 pence. In total, according to Miranda Kaufmann, Corsi would have received around a hundred pounds from the Admiralty, via royal treasurer Wymond Carew, between 1547 and 1549. For Gustav Ungerer, in addition to the £77 in 1547, Corsi would have received a further £70 in 1549. By then, the divers had also recovered cannons.

== The Sancta Maria et Sanctus Edwardus ==
1730 chart of the Solent region: center Isle of Wight with The Needles at its western tip; across the channel northeast Portsmouth, north up the Southampton Water estuary Southampton; far east Arundel.

The Mary Rose was not the only sunken ship on which Corsi and his divers worked. According to Gustav Ungerer on July 4, 1546, or to Miranda Kaufmann on November 11, 1546, a merchant ship, the Sancta Maria et Sanctus Edwardus, left Southampton for Livorno, laden mainly with cloth, bales of wool, and Cornish tin ingots. The ship caught fire shortly after setting sail and sank less than three kilometers from the coast. The ship was owned by the Venetian Francesco Bernardi and chartered by various Italian merchants: the Consul of the Venetians in London Domenico Erizzo; the Florentine Bartolomeo Fortini, one of the principal merchants in the English capital; and the Genoese-born Englishman Niccolo de Marini. They wished to recover at least part of their investment and hired Corsi and his divers, including Jacques Francis.

The diving campaign could not begin immediately due to winter. It was therefore only in the summer of 1547 that salvage operations could take place. Corsi and his divers were paid 2 shillings and 4 pence per day, and their living expenses (food and drink) at Southampton's Dolphin Inn were also covered. At the end of October 1547, the Italian merchants terminated the contract with Corsi's diving team due to a complete lack of results.

On September 29, 1547, Piero Paolo Corsi was arrested and brought before Thomas Beckingham, the mayor of Southampton. He was accused by Domenico Erizzo and Bartolomeo Fortini of stealing part of the cargo of the Sancta Maria et Sanctus Edwardus that he was supposed to recover. His divers were alleged to have visited the wreck at night to retrieve two tin ingots, one belonging to Erizzo and the other to Fortini (the ingots were marked with their owners' initials). Each ingot was valued at £20. According to Niccolo de Marini, another investor, Corsi had hidden one of the ingots under the bed of a man named Pope, a resident of Gosport, a port between Southampton and Portsmouth. De Marini then sent one of his servants to retrieve the ingot and deliver it to the port captain of Portsmouth, Edward Vaughan. The latter questioned Corsi about the origin of the ingot, and Corsi replied that it had been found on the seabed. Vaughan took Corsi at his word, but the two men were acquainted, as it was Vaughan who, on behalf of the Admiralty, paid Corsi for his work on the Mary Rose. Having recovered the ingot, Corsi approached another Florentine merchant, Angelo de Milanese, to inquire what reward Fortini would be willing to offer for its return. Corsi was disappointed with the mere 20 shillings offered; he demanded more. Fortini and Erizzo then had him arrested. Before Beckingham, Corsi did not deny possessing an ingot marked "DE" (for Domenico Erizzo) but explained that he and his men were not paid well enough and that he had kept the ingot as compensation. He believed his and his divers' efforts were worth at least three or four ingots.

Nevertheless, Corsi was not imprisoned. It was even Angelo de Milanese who secured his immediate release. It appears that the merchant community could scarcely do without Corsi's and his divers' services. Soon after, Corsi even obtained letters from the Lord High Admiral Thomas Seymour demanding that he not be troubled, as his work on the Mary Rose was essential to the state.

It appears that Corsi himself worked in the water: witnesses at the trial reported seeing him swim and even dive, using instruments to descend. It is difficult to determine whether his Venetian origins played a role and if he knew techniques for pressure equalization, enabling him to dive as deep as Jacques Francis and his employees. It is impossible to know what type of equipment they used to descend and retrieve objects. Rudimentary diving bells already existed, but it is unknown if Corsi and his divers employed them. It is certain, however, that tin ingots were brought to the surface after being attached with a rope.

== Testimony before the High Court of Admiralty ==
Despite having recovered his tin, Domenico Erizzo still wanted Piero Paolo Corsi punished. He therefore brought the matter before the High Court of Admiralty in December 1547. Fortini apparently did not. On the other hand, it appears that Bartolomeo Fortini did not pursue legal action against Corsi. The trial lasted two years, with testimony from numerous merchants and sailors from various parts of England and Italy. Jacques Francis was also called to testify. The fact that he was the only one of Corsi's divers summoned as a witness might indicate a position of authority held by Jacques Francis over the others. This raised two questions: the color of his skin and his legal status.

Jacques Francis appeared in court on February 8, 1548, dressed "in the English style." He responded not only to the accusations against his employer but also to the criticisms directed at himself. His travel expenses from Southampton, his accommodation costs in London, and his clothing were covered by Corsi, as Francis was, in any case, too poor. Moreover, the "English-style" attire appears to have been a requirement of decorum for appearing before the court of justice. However, an interpreter, John Tyrart, a wine merchant from Blackfriars, had to be used. He translated from either Portuguese or the "fala da Guiné," a Portuguese-derived language used in the region of Africa from which Francis originated for communication between local populations and Portuguese merchants. Thus, Jacques Francis became the first person of African origin whose "voice" was heard in an English courtroom. He spoke in a composed and confident manner.

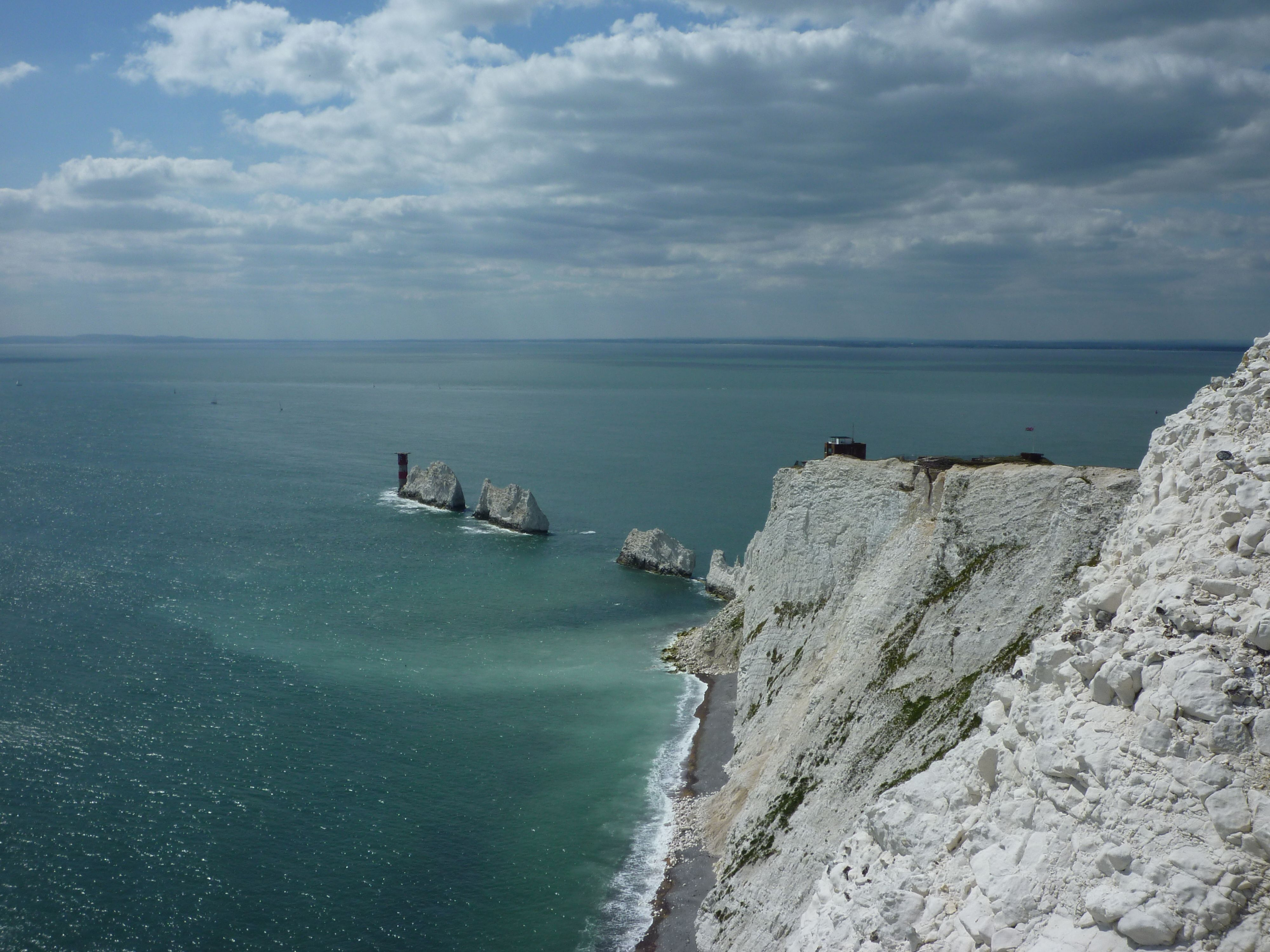
The Needles, where Francis claimed the tin was found.

In his testimony, Jacques Francis explained that Corsi was innocent. He stated that, with the other divers, he had discovered 200 tin ingots, a bell, and some lead at the bottom of the sea near the western tip of the Isle of Wight, close to the rocks called The Needles off western Isle of Wight. Given that this was the site of many shipwrecks, the discovery was plausible. To recover these items, whose value was probably exaggerated at around £700, Corsi would have purchased various instruments for £75, which could not be used during the prime diving season because Erizzo allegedly had Corsi imprisoned for the entire month of May 1547 (contradicting the previously mentioned arrest in early September).

== Legal status ==
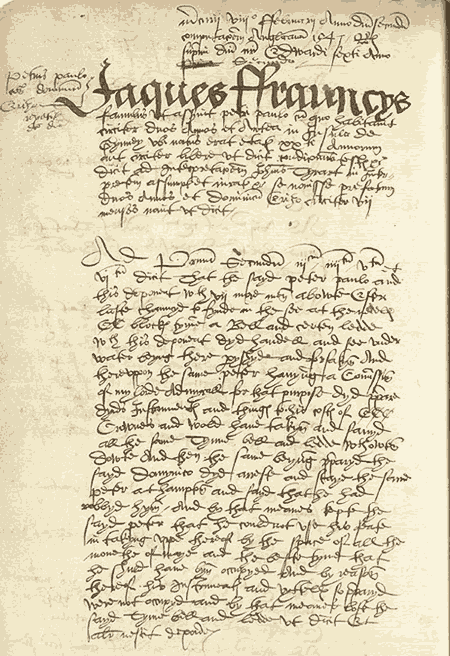
First page of Jacques Francis's testimony, High Court of Admiralty, 8 February 1548.

Before Jacques Francis was called to testify, Domenico Erizzo had objected to his being heard by the court, arguing that he was a "slave," an "infidel," a "black man," and an "uncivilized savage". The Admiralty, however, considered that Francis had been in the best possible position to know what had truly happened and whether ingots had indeed been stolen.

Subsequently, to discredit Jacques Francis's testimony, various witnesses were heard up until May and June 1549: Antonio de Nicolao, a 32-year-old Venetian sailor living in Southampton who claimed to have known Jacques Francis for three years; Niccolo de Marini, aged 40, one of the investors in the Sancta Maria et Sanctus Edwardus; and Domenico Milanese (perhaps a relative of Angelo de Milanese?), aged 32, who claimed to have known Francis for two years. All declared that Francis was a "Moor" ("Morisco"), "born where they are not baptized," and a slave of Corsi. Therefore, he could not be trusted.

The fact of considering Jacques Francis a "Morisco," a term then used to refer to a person from Morocco, may not be a simple geographical error but could be a slip of the tongue by the prosecution witnesses. The use of the term "Morisco" is indeed attested in Reconquista Spain to designate Muslims converted to Catholicism. The term appears in Tudor England as well. Furthermore, the "Christian" first and last name of Jacques Francis might suggest precisely that he had been baptized, either in Arguin by Portuguese missionaries perhaps, or during his travels to or within Europe by one or another of the Christians in whose service he found himself. Finally, the High Court of Admiralty would not have heard him if he had not been a Christian and sworn on the Bible. The remaining issue is that Jacques Francis was more likely Catholic in a Reformed England.

In his testimony, Antonio de Nicolao claimed that Corsi had once tried, unsuccessfully, to sell Jacques Francis. As for Niccolo de Marini, he stated that "everyone knew Francis was a slave." According to the English laws in force at the time, not only would it have been illegal for Corsi to sell Francis, as the slave trade was prohibited, but slavery itself was illegal. Jacques Francis could not legally be a slave. Various measures, gradually accumulating in British common law, had effectively outlawed slavery. Nevertheless, it happened that foreign merchants, primarily Italian, Spanish, or Portuguese, originating from regions where slavery was practiced, continued to believe they owned their slaves, even though they were "freed" by their arrival in England—at least as long as they did not draw attention. As soon as the situation became known, things changed. Subsequent legal rulings inform us that "the air of England is so pure that it cannot suffer slavery," to quote a later legal judgment concerning a Russian slave in 1569. In the 1470s, in Southampton itself, a Venetian merchant had tried to sell one of his "slaves" to a Genoese colleague. She had taken the matter to court, proof that she knew the legislation.

Moreover, numerous testimonies during this trial were very clear regarding the fact that Jacques Francis was paid, and thus was not a slave. Antonio de Nicolao himself had compared Corsi's divers to poor laborers forced to work where they could to survive. He even claimed to have seen them working on the Southampton docks during the off-season for diving (winter). Domenico Erizzo, to discredit Corsi, recounted encountering him in the street arguing with one of his employees about wages. Piero Paolo Corsi's own argument for his "theft" of the tin ingots was that he and his men were not paid enough.

The very fact that Jacques Francis was permitted to testify confirms his legal status as a free man: villeins (English serfs with very few rights) did not even have that right. In his testimony, Francis describes himself as Corsi's "famulus." For Miranda Kaufmann, he would thus have considered himself a "familiar," a "member of the entourage," and not at all a "servus," a "slave." He would therefore have been well aware that he was a free man. However, this does not preclude the possibility that he may have been a slave upon arriving in England; or even that Corsi, like other Italian merchants who believed their own legislation applied elsewhere, genuinely tried, without success, to sell Francis on the Southampton docks. It may have even been on that occasion that Jacques Francis could have understood that the air of Britain had made him free. Gustav Ungerer, for his part, translates "famulus" not as a "captive slave," but as a "domestic slave," working alongside free servants. It could also be a matter of translation from the "fala da Guine" into a Latin term incorporated into English.

In March 1549, one of Domenico Erizzo's lawyers filed a motion with the court requesting that the testimonies of four other employees of Corsi not be heard: those of John Wescott from Devon, William Mussen from Warwickshire, and the two other African divers John Ito and George Blacke. A long list of arguments was invoked: they were, among other things, "vagabonds," "poor, corrupt," "faithless," "infidels," or "pagans." Yet, Jacques Francis is not mentioned in the motion, perhaps further proof that he was neither pagan nor a slave.

Jacques Francis's testimony before the High Court of Admiralty set a number of legal and social precedents. First, it represented a legal recognition of the presence of Black Africans in England. Second, skin color or ethnic origin would no longer make a difference in the application of common law. Finally, Jacques Francis was, perhaps for the first time, the very example that an African was not an inferior "uncivilized savage," but an individual with qualifications essential to the country, capable of speaking intelligently and with composure.

== Later years ==
Only conjectures can be made about the subsequent life of Jacques Francis.

According to Miranda Kaufmann, the verdict of the trial before the High Court of Admiralty is not known. Nevertheless, Piero Paolo Corsi made another mistake. In September 1549, he abandoned operations on the Mary Rose to enter the service of Henry FitzAlan, 12th Earl of Arundel, and recover objects from the sea near Arundel Castle. This "dereliction of duty" was also considered a betrayal by the Admiralty, and Corsi spent six months in the Tower of London. Gustav Ungerer, for his part, considers that Corsi's six months in the Tower of London from October 1549 to March 1550 were the sentence handed down by the court. Upon his release, it is uncertain whether he was still able to employ Jacques Francis's services.

Jacques Francis's qualifications, not to mention the apparently high number of wrecks in English waters, certainly allowed him to find employment quickly and easily, perhaps even to earn a decent living. At the end of the 16th century, a tax was levied on all foreigners living in England. Tax rolls show that at that time, ten people of African origin lived in Southampton.

== Bibliography ==
- Costello, Ray (2019). Francis, Jacques [also known as Jaques Frauncys]. Oxford Dictionary of National Biography.
- Orme, Nicholas (1983). Early British Swimming 55 BC - AD 1719 : with the First Swimming Treatise in English, 1595. University of Exeter Press. ISBN 0-85989-134-8.
- Kaufmann, Miranda (2018). Black Tudors : The Untold Story. Oneworld. ISBN 978-1-78607-396-9.
- Nubia, Onyeka (2019). England's Other Countrymen : Black Tudor Society. Zed. ISBN 978-1-78699-421-9.
- Ungerer, Gustav (2005). Recovering a black African's voice in an English lawsuit: Jacques Francis and the salvage operations of the Mary Rose and the Sancta Maria and Sanctus Edwardus, 1545–ca 1550. Medieval and Renaissance Drama in England.
