= Reason (surname) =

Reason is an English surname. It originates as a nickname for "a man of reason, good judgement, or wise words" and the word ultimately comes from Old French raisun, raiso(u)n.

Notable people with the surname include:

- Charles L. Reason (1818–1893), American linguist and mathematician
- Dana Reason, 20th/21st-century Canadian musician
- J. Paul Reason (born 1941), American naval officer
- James Reason (1938–2025), British psychology professor
- John Reason, possible alternative name of Reasonable Blackman
- Jumbo Reason (1884–?), English footballer
- Patrick H. Reason (1816–1898), American lithographer and engraver
