= No Reason =

No Reason may refer to:

== Film and television ==
- "No Reason" (House), an episode of the television series House
- No Reason, a 2010 German horror film directed by Olaf Ittenbach

== Music ==
- "No Reason" (Grinspoon song), 2002
- "No Reason" (No Money Enterprise song), 2020
- "No Reason", a song from the 2018 stage musical Beetlejuice
- "No Reason", a song by Big Thief from their 2022 album Dragon New Warm Mountain I Believe in You
- "No Reason", a song by Madness from their 2024 album Theatre of the Absurd Presents C'est la Vie
- "No Reason", a song by Monsta X from their 2019 album Take.2 We Are Here
- "No Reason", a song by the Spencer Davis Group from their 1974 album Living in a Back Street
- "No Reason", a song by Sum 41 from their 2004 album Chuck
- "No Reason", a song by The Chemical Brothers taken from their 2023 album For That Beautiful Feeling

== Others ==
- No Reason (horse), A Japanese thoroughbred racehorse.

== See also ==
- Reason (disambiguation)
