= Black Tudors: The Untold Story =

2017 history book by Miranda Kaufmann

- First edition cover
- Author: Miranda Kaufmann
- Language: English
- Subject: Africans in Tudor and early Stuart England
- Genre: Social history
- Publisher: Oneworld Publications
- Publication date: 2017
- Publication place: United Kingdom
- Media type: Print (hardback, paperback), e-book
- Pages: 384
- ISBN: 978-1-78607-184-2 (hardback); ISBN 978-1-78607-396-9 (paperback, 2018)

Black Tudors: The Untold Story is a 2017 work of history by the British historian Miranda Kaufmann, published by Oneworld Publications. Drawing on parish registers, legal records, letters and other archival sources, the book reconstructs the lives of ten Africans and people of African descent who lived in England in the sixteenth and early seventeenth centuries.

The book was shortlisted for the 2018 Wolfson History Prize and was named a book of the year by the Evening Standard and The Observer.

== Background ==
Black Tudors was published in 2017 as a work of social history. The book was written to challenge the assumption that people of African descent were absent from, or only present as enslaved people in, Tudor England. Despite its title, the book covers the period from the sixteenth century to the 1620s, which is the mid Tudor to early Stuart period. It was published in a paperback edition in 2018.

== Synopsis ==
The book is organised around ten case studies, each given its own chapter. The ten subjects are seven men and three women, whose lives and occupations are reconstructed from fragmentary records, such as parish registers, legal records, letters and other archival sources.

Through these case studies, Kaufmann argues that the belief that all Africans in early modern England were enslaved is mistaken, and that free Africans were part of English society. Noémie Ndiaye, in her review, summarises Kaufmann's conclusion as being that these individuals' lives were hard in the same ways as those of most Tudors. According to Ndiaye, Kaufmann presents their difficulties as arising principally from social status rather than skin colour.

=== John Blanke ===
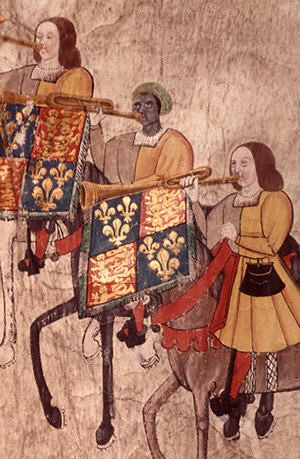
Extract from the 1511 Westminster Tournament Roll almost certainly showing Blanke, wearing a green turban latticed with yellow

John Blanke (also rendered Blancke or Blaaak) (fl. 1501–1511) was a musician of African descent in London from the early Tudor period, who probably came to England as one of the African attendants of Catherine of Aragon in 1501. He is one of the earliest documented Africans in what is now the United Kingdom after the Roman period. His name may refer to his skin colour, derived either from the word "black" or possibly from the French word "blanc", meaning white.

=== Jacques Francis ===
Jacques Francis, also known as Jaques Frauncys, (c. 1527 – after February 1548) was an African salvage diver who led the expedition to salvage King Henry VIII's guns from the Mary Rose. He was the first African to give evidence in 1548 before a court. He was accused of being a "slave" and an "infidel" in an attempt to discredit his evidence, but he was paid wages so he was not a slave and furthermore, "slaves were not allowed to give evidence in court".

=== Edward Swarthye, a porter ===
Edward Swarthye was a black porter in the Gloucestershire household of Sir Edward Wynter. He was most likely brought to England after Francis Drake's Caribbean raid of 1585–86. In 1596, Swarthye publicly administered a whipping of John Guye, Wynter’s ironworks manager and the future governor of Newfoundland, at White Cross Manor. The incident was connected to a feud between the Wynter and Bucke families. Swarthye subsequently testified before the Court of Star Chamber in 1597. Kaufmann points out that the court's acceptance of his testimony was evidence that he was a free man.

=== Reasonable Blackman ===
Reasonable Blackman (fl. 1579–1592) (also possibly known as John Reason, Reasonable Blakemore and Reasonable Blackmore) was an independent silk weaver who lived in Southwark, London, in the late 16th century. Based on his name, a number of sources since the 2010s have suggested he may have been among the earliest African people to live in Britain. If he was of African origin, he may have come to London via the Netherlands, which had a tiny African population at the time from Spanish and Portuguese colonies and also a significant trade in silk.

Blackman's life is only known from a handful of mentions in administrative documents. The first record of Reasonable is dated to 1579 in the Parish records of St Saviour's church (later Southwark Cathedral), looking for a reservation for the Easter Sunday service. Historian Miranda Kaufmann has argued that in these documents he is described specifically as a "blackmor" or "blackmore", a popular term at the time used to denote people of a Sub Saharan African origin, rather than merely having the surname "Blackman" or "Blackmore", which in the 16th century could not be confidently used to indicate African origin, as these surnames were used by local English people, with their usage deriving from having dark hair, an origin in the various settlements named Moore, More, Blackmore, Blackmoor (including the one in Hampshire and Somerset), and Blakemere, or even simply that they lived in the vicinity of a moor. By 1587 Blackman was married and therefore clearly had sufficient means to support a family. It has been suggested that he made costumes for the theatres in the area.

He had at least three children, of whom at least one, Edward, was baptised at St Olave's Church, Southwark in February 1587. A fourth child with a similar surname, John Blakemore, who was also baptised at St Olave's on 26 October 1579, may also have been his. Two of his children, Edmund and Jane, died of bubonic plague in 1592. They were buried with due ritual in St Olave's churchyard.

=== Mary Fillis, a Moroccan convert ===
Mary Fillis (fl. 1599) was a seamstress in Tudor England. She was of Moorish descent, was born to Fillis of Morisco, a Moroccan craftsman specializing in basket weaving and shovel making. Born into a Muslim family, Fillis expressed a desire for baptism to her employer, Porter, signifying her willingness to assimilate into the culture of Britain. The consequent baptism was held at St Botolph's in Aldgate, London, in 1597.

Fillis migrated to London around 1583–4, and first served as a servant to merchant John Barker before becoming a seamstress under Millicent Porter in East Smithfield by 1597.

Following Porter's death in 1599, Fillis's subsequent fate remains unknown. Her residence in London occurred amidst diplomatic negotiations between England and Morocco against their mutual opponent, Spain, influencing the societal context of her life in Tudor England.

=== John Anthony, a mariner of Dover ===
John Anthony was an African mariner living in Dover who, Kaufmann argues, probably arrived in England in the winter of 1615 with the pirate Henry Mainwaring.

In March 1619, he sailed aboard the Silver Falcon on an expedition intended to trade with Virginia and northwards, towards Canada. The ship instead acquired tobacco near Bermuda, possibly through piracy, and docked at Flushing in the Netherlands before returning to Dover. A dispute between the investors who financed the voyage delayed the payment of crew wages, leaving Anthony indebted for food, lodging and washing and forcing him to mortgage his best clothes. He was paide with interest in March 1620. Kaufmann interprets his relatively high earnings as suggesting skilled work, perhaps as a quartermaster, carpenter or gunner, and emphasises that his paid employment and successful pursuit of his wages demonstrate freedom and agency. This would have been in contrast to the experience of African slaves, brought to Virginia in 1619.

=== Anne Cobbie ===
Anne Cobbie worked as a prostitute in the 1620s at a brothel run by John and Jane Bankes in Westminster. Men reportedly would pay her a gold coin worth 22 shillings, rather than the five shillings paid to other women, because of the softness of her skin. She was described by another prostitute, Mary Hall, as a "tawny moore", which Kaufmann suggests indicates North African origins or mixed African and English parentage, although neither is established. Cobbie was among ten women named when the Bankeses were charged with keeping a brothel in 1626; while the couple were briefly imprisoned, the article states that Cobbie escaped punishment.

=== Cattelena of Almondsbury ===
Cattelena (died 1625) was a woman who lived in Almondsbury, England.

She is primarily known from her posthumous inventory dated 1625. Her Hispanic name suggests origins connected to Spanish or Portuguese territories. The term "independent singlewoman" from her inventory indicates she was both unmarried, like about 30 per cent of Tudor women, and self-reliant.

Cattelena's livelihood seemingly derived from her most valuable possession, a cow, suggesting she traded surplus dairy products. Despite this, her means were modest, as evidenced by her shared accommodation and the humble belongings listed in her inventory.

== Critical reception ==
In Shakespeare Quarterly, Noémie Ndiaye praised the book's choice of case studies, noting its attention to gender and to geographic variety beyond London, and said that it provides new data of value to scholars of early modern racial formations. Kirkus Reviews described the book as an account correcting the common perception that Africans in England were all enslaved.

The book was shortlisted for the 2018 Wolfson History Prize, which is awarded for the history book judged to best combine readability with excellence in research. It was also and named a book of the year by the Evening Standard and The Observer.

The book has been used to develop lessons in the English schools Key Stage 3 history curriculum.

== Bibliography ==
- Apps, Kerry (2019). "Widening the early modern world to create a more connected Key Stage 3 curriculum". Teaching History (176). Historical Association: 48–57. ISSN 0040-0610.
- Bakre, Tolu (n.d.). "Unforgotten Black Women: Mary Fillis, A Seamstress Driven By Independence". Refinery29.
- "Africans and their lives in Tudor England". BBC Bitesize.
- Bidisha (30 October 2017). "Tudor, English and black – and not a slave in sight". The Guardian. London, England.
- "BLACK TUDORS...A peek into the lives of ten people of the African Diaspora who lived in Tudor Britain". Black History Month 2023. 16 May 2019.
- "Black Tudors". Black Tudors.
- "Shortlist announced for the 2018 Wolfson History Prize". The British Academy. 16 April 2018.
- Chakravarty, Urvashi (1 December 2022). "Slavery and White Womanhood in Early Modern England". Renaissance Quarterly. 75 (4): 1144–1179. doi:10.1017/rqx.2022.329.
- Habib, Imtiaz; Salkeld, Duncan (3 April 2015). "The Resonables of Boroughside, Southwark: an Elizabethan black family near the Rose Theatre". Shakespeare. 11 (2): 135–156. doi:10.1080/17450918.2013.766633. ISSN 1745-0918.
- "Black faces of Tudor England". HistoryExtra.
- Jackson, Sarah (18 July 2016). "Mary Fillis: Baptised at St Botolph's, Aldgate in 1597". East End Women's Museum.
- Johnston, Katherine (23 November 2017). "London's forgotten black Tudors, including a Southwark-based 16th century silk trader". Southwark News. Southwark, London, England. Archived from the original on 7 June 2025.
- Kaufmann, Miranda (2011). Africans in Britain, 1500-1640 (DPhil thesis). Oxford. doi:10.5287/ora-5jgpnx4jv.
- Kaufmann, Miranda (2017). Black Tudors: the untold story. London, England: Oneworld Publications. ISBN 9781786071842.
- Kaufmann, Miranda (9 November 2017). "The prosperous silk weaver". BBC History Magazine. Archived from the original on 29 July 2019.
- "Black Tudors". Kirkus Reviews. 10 September 2017.
- Ndiaye, Noémie (Winter 2018). "Black Tudors: The Untold Story by Miranda Kaufmann (review)". Shakespeare Quarterly. 69 (4): 263–266.
- Ndiaye, Noémie (2022). Scripts of blackness: early modern performance culture and the making of race (1st ed.). Philadelphia: University of Pennsylvania Press. ISBN 9781512822632.
- Salkeld, Duncan (2018). Shakespeare and London. Oxford University Press. p. 146. ISBN 9780192559784. Archived from the original on 5 August 2025.
- Sattin, Anthony (3 December 2017). "Anthony Sattin's best history books of 2017". The Guardian.
- Shrank, Cathy (31 December 2022). "Making History: Poetry and Prosopopoeia". History in the Humanities and Social Sciences: 286–305. doi:10.1017/9781009231053.013.
- "The best books of 2017". The Standard. 19 September 2018.
- Taylor, Mildred Europa (28 June 2022). "The extraordinary rise of Mary Fillis, a successful seamstress from Morocco who lived in Tudor England in 1500s". Face2Face Africa.
