= Beyond a Reasonable Doubt (disambiguation) =

Beyond a reasonable doubt refers to the legal principle of reasonable doubt, the standard of proof required in most criminal cases.

Beyond (a) Reasonable Doubt may also refer to:

- Beyond a Reasonable Doubt (1956 film), a film directed by Fritz Lang
- Beyond Reasonable Doubt (1980 film), a docudrama based on a book by David Yallop
- Beyond a Reasonable Doubt (2009 film), a remake of the 1956 film
- Beyond Reasonable Doubt, a 1978 book by David Yallop about the murder of Harvey and Jeanette Crewe
- Beyond Reasonable Doubt (play), a play by Jeffrey Archer
- Beyond Reasonable Doubt, an album by Candiria

== See also ==
- Reasonable doubt (disambiguation)
