= Age of reason =

The Age of Reason, or the Enlightenment, was an intellectual and philosophical movement that dominated the world of ideas in Europe during the 17th to 19th centuries.

Age of reason or Age of Reason may also refer to:

- Age of reason (canon law), the age at which children attain the use of reason and begin to have moral responsibility
- The Age of Reason, a theological work by Thomas Paine, published 1794–1807
- The Age of Reason (novel), a 1945 novel by Jean-Paul Sartre
- "The Age of Reason" (Boardwalk Empire), a 2011 episode of the TV series
- Age of Reason, a blog of the National Youth Rights Association
- The Age of Reason (film), final part of the documentary film series The Doon School Quintet
- Age of Reason (film), a 2018 Finnish romantic drama film

== Music ==
- Age of Reason (album), a 1988 album by John Farnham
  - "Age of Reason" (song)
- The Age of Reason, 2017 re-recording of the 1984 album The Age of Consent by Bronski Beat
- "Age of Reason", a song by Black Sabbath from the 2013 album 13

== See also ==
- The Age of Unreason, a series of science fiction novels by Gregory Keyes
- Cult of Reason, a brief time during the French Revolution
- "Rage of Reason", a 2008 song by Vesania from the album Distractive Killusions
