= Reasonable Doubt (disambiguation) =

Reasonable doubt refers to the legal standard of proof required in most criminal cases.

Reasonable Doubt(s) may refer to:

== Films ==
- Reasonable Doubt (1936 film), a British comedy
- Reasonable Doubt (2014 film), a crime thriller starring Samuel L. Jackson

== Television ==
- Reasonable Doubt (TV series), a legal drama series streaming on Hulu (2022–)
- Reasonable Doubts, a 1990s American police drama series
- "Reasonable Doubt" (Doctors), a 2002 episode
- "Reasonable Doubt", an episode of season 7 of Touched by an Angel (2000)
- "Reasonable Doubt", an episode of season 15 of Law & Order: Special Victims Unit (2014)
- Reasonable Doubt, a true-crime series broadcast on Investigation Discovery (2017–2022)

== Other uses ==
- Reasonable Doubt (album), a 1996 album by rapper Jay-Z
- Reasonable Doubt, a 2008 play by Suzie Miller

== See also ==
- Beyond a reasonable doubt (disambiguation)
