= Salvage diving =

Diving work associated with the recovery of vehicles, cargo and structures

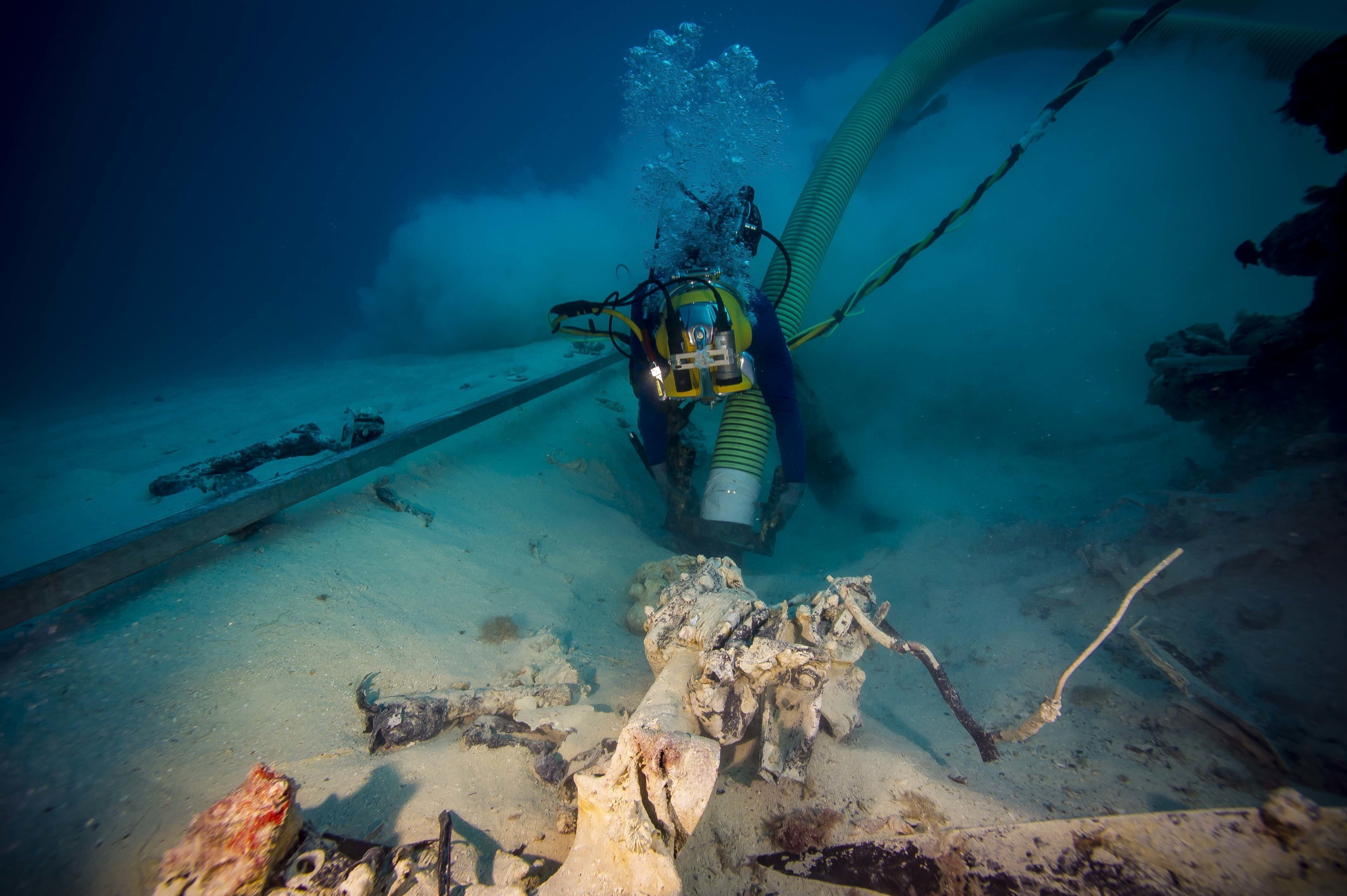
US Navy diver dredging an excavation site during an underwater recovery operation, searching for personnel who went missing during WWII off the coast of Koror

Salvage diving is the diving work associated with the recovery of all or part of ships, their cargoes, aircraft, and other vehicles and structures which have sunk or fallen into water. In the case of ships it may also refer to repair work done to make an abandoned or distressed but still floating vessel more suitable for towing or propulsion under its own power. The recreational/technical activity known as wreck diving is generally not considered salvage work, though some recovery of artifacts may be done by recreational divers.

Most salvage diving is commercial work, or military work, depending on the diving contractor and the purpose for the salvage operation, Similar underwater work may be done by divers as part of forensic investigations into accidents, in which case the procedures may be more closely allied with underwater archaeology than the more basic procedures of advantageous cost/benefit expected in commercial and military operations.

Clearance diving, the removal of obstructions and hazards to navigation, is closely related to salvage diving, but has a different purpose, in that the objects to be removed are not intended to be recovered, just removed or reduced to a condition where they no longer constitute a hazard or obstruction. Many of the techniques and procedures used in clearance diving are also used in salvage work.

== Range of salvage activities ==
The US Navy considers the recovery of sunken or wrecked naval craft, submarines, human remains, critical items of equipment needed to determine the cause of a mishap, including classified and sensitive materials to be within the scope of their salvage and recovery operations. Commercial salvors will generally undertake an operation if it is likely to be sufficiently profitable, taking into account the known hazards and risks.

== Diving work associated with marine salvage operations ==
Where practicable, procedures which minimise the work needed to be done by divers are used, as diving is slow, labour-intensive, dangerous, expensive, often inefficient, and may require other work near the dive site to be interrupted during the dive. However it is the only way some tasks can be done, and for some it is the most efficient way to do them.

=== Survey of underwater damage ===
For stranded and floating vessels, a detailed hull survey includes the parts of the ship that are underwater. These will be external areas below sea level, and any internal areas that are flooded. If sea conditions or access are unsuitable for external survey, internal survey will have to be more comprehensive as the information about one side must be extrapolated to provide needed information about the inaccessible side. The diving survey includes:

- The areas of the hull in contact with the seabed
- A description of the points of contact with the bottom
- The position of any pinnacles in contact with the hull or nearby, that may affect salvage operations
- Position of any penetrations of bottom material into the hull.
- The position, orientation and size of all holes, tears and cracks in immersed parts of the hull and topsides
- The condition of all through hull penetrations such as sea suctions, discharges and valves, and whether they are clear and functional
- The condition and functionality of all underwater appendages
- Signs of leaking pollutants and other fluids
- The type of seabed and the location and extent of scouring or sediment deposition.

The dive team should be briefed on all structural damage found inside the hull so that they can check for underwater damage in the same areas. When practicable the work of the divers should be minimised as diving is slow, labor-intensive, dangerous and expensive work. Tidal flow can change the conditions and limit diving operations, and also affect the condition of the vessel and seabed in the vicinity. Where scouring is likely it should be monitored by regular underwater inspections. Video records allow comparison to estimate the rate of scour or deposition.

=== Patching of damage ===
Underwater patching is almost always done by divers. As much patch fabrication and rigging as possible should be done out of the water to minimise diving time. Small leaks are generally sealed off and made watertight by wooden plugs and wedges, small wooden patches and concrete boxes, small steel plate patches or combinations of these, caulked and sometimes additionally sealed with epoxy resin or fibre-reinforced resins. Small steel patches for minor leaks are usually fitted with gasket material to seal against the damaged hull. Major patching is characterized by extensive diving work and includes detailed underwater surveys, measurements, and major underwater cutting and welding operations to prepare and fit the patch.

=== Reinforcement and shoring ===
If a ship is pumped out while the deck is submerged the top of the deck is loaded by hydrostatic pressure and may require shoring to support the load. This is generally done by divers and is time-consuming and expensive. The load may also be compensated by compressed air in the space if practicable.

=== Installing cofferdams ===
A cofferdam is an enclosure built within a body of water to allow the enclosed area to be pumped out. This pumping creates a dry working environment so that the work can be carried out safely.

When all or part of the main deck of a sunken ship is submerged, flooded spaces cannot be dewatered until all openings are sealed or the effective freeboard is extended above the high water level. In salvage, one method of doing this is to build a temporary watertight extension of the entire hull of the ship, or the space to be dewatered, to the surface. This watertight extension is a cofferdam. Although they are temporary structures, cofferdams have to be strongly built, heavily stiffened, and reinforced to withstand the hydrostatic and other loads that they will have to withstand. Large cofferdams, are normally confined to harbor operations.

Complete cofferdams cover most or all of the sunken vessel and are equivalent to extensions of the ship's sides to above the water surface.

Partial cofferdams are constructed around moderate-sized openings or areas such as a cargo hatch or small deckhouse. They can often usually be prefabricated and installed as a unit, or prefabricated panels can be joined during erection. When partial cofferdams are used, it may be necessary to compensate for hydrostatic pressure on the deck by shoring the decks. With both complete and partial cofferdams, there is usually a large free surface in the spaces being pumped.

Small cofferdams are used for pumping or to allow salvors access to spaces that are covered by water at some stage of the tide. They are usually prefabricated and fitted around minor openings.

Diving work on cofferdams often involves clearing obstructions, fitting, and fastening, including underwater welding, and where necessary, caulking, bracing and shoring the adjacent structure.

== Planning of salvage diving operations ==
=== Information gathering ===
Detailed information of the layout and structure of the vessel to be salvages and the type and location of cargo are useful for planning and essential for the actual salvage operation. Information acquired during the planning stage can greatly facilitate the actual operation.

If the vessel is to be raised, details of the cause of sinking and the extent of damage is required.

Useful information can be gathered from ships plans, cargo manifests, loading plans, interviews with witnesses and survivors, photographs and official reports of similar accidents.

=== Planning of the salvage operations ===
The choice of salvage systems depends on the specific conditions of the job. Divers can work efficiently in shallow water, but the practicality decreases rapidly with depth and has an absolute limit determined by current technology. They bring the advantages of human vision, judgement and high dexterity manipulative skills, but these are offset by depth limitations, dive duration, risk, support requirements and cost. Crewed submersibles and atmospheric diving suits can go deeper than ambient pressure diving without decompression obligations, and have advantages of human vision and judgement, and when working without tethers have good maneuverability, but dexterity is compromised, and cost is high. Tethered uncrewed ROUVs eliminate the risk to human life and are available with a wide range of capabilities which can be matched to the operational requirements, and are not limited by operator fatigue.

=== Searching for objects and wreck sites ===
Underwater search and recovery operations are used to locate, identify, observe and recover specific objects from the seafloor. Typically, search and recovery operations are conducted as two distinct phases - the search includes detection and identification of the target and, in some cases, direct inspection. Operations are generally planned to suit expected conditions, but plans should be sufficiently flexible to allow for changes to suit actual conditions.

==== Search equipment ====
The equipment available for underwater searches ranges from simple equipment like grapples and draglines to complex acoustic technologies and magnetic field sensors.

- Echo-sounders can provide a continuous record of depth under the ship during a search, which can reveal obstacles that might damage towed transponders. They have a narrow beam and poor resolution, and would only be likely to find large targets.
- Side-scan sonar uses acoustic transducers which scan a fairly wide swath to each side of the vessel or towed unit. Large areas can be covered in each pass. There is a narrow band directly below the transducer that is not covered. The image produced can have a fairly high resolution and can identify seabed texture an artifacts above a moderate size. The image produced can be interpreted visually to identify a wide range of three-dimensional shapes, and is fairly efficient in covering large areas. The effective resolution depends mainly on the operating frequency, with higher frequency giving greater resolution but shorter effective range and narrower width of seabed covered in each pass. A 500 kHz system might effectively scan a swath of 50 to 100m with the possibility of detecting a target of the order of 1m diameter, while a 30 kHz system might find a shipwreck in a swath of up to 5 km wide, depending on depth. The data may be viewed in real time and recorded for further analysis.
- Multi-beam sonar
- Towed pinger locators are passive acoustic search systems that only receive a signal from an acoustic beacon, Aircraft that fly over the sea carry such a beacon on the flight data recorder in case they are lost at sea. They do not always have directional resolution and may need several passes to locate the target accurately.
- Magnetometers can detect variations in magnetic field that may be caused by masses of ferromagnetic material - iron and steel - and cables carrying electric current. Since ships usually contain a fairly to very large amount of ferromagnetic material, this equipment is quite effective for locating shipwrecks. They are also useful for resolving ambiguous targets in areas of high topographical variation, and can detect targets buried under sediment.
- Optical Imaging Systems. can be used for underwater searches if the visibility is good enough. In deep water they need to carry their own light source. They can be used in combination with side scan sonar, to help with identification of an object as it is found.

Remotely operated vehicles are platforms that can carry sensors underwater and maneuver them in proximity to the object. They are limited to operating in relatively small areas because the support ship must loiter almost directly over the ROV and the umbilical limits the system's maneuverability. An ROV can be very effective at locating small isolated targets in a known debris field, and visually identifying a target in good visibility.

==== Search patterns ====
The effectiveness of a search can be expressed by how thoroughly and efficiently the search area is examined. Systematic examination of the search area is achieved by following a predetermined pattern that suits the conditions of the search.

- Parallel grid search: The most common pattern for a towed sensor search, using parallel straight line search tracks. Adjacent tracks use sufficient overlap to compensate for errors in the path, width variations in the scanned swath and losses in resolution at the extreme edges. The turn between each leg of the search must allow the towed array to stabilise depth and lateral position before the new leg scan, and this can take a significant part of the search time. A towed array should preferably be towed roughly parallel to the depth contours as this reduces the need for depth changes on each leg.

== Salvage work ==
Marine salvage is the process of recovering a ship and its cargo after a shipwreck or other maritime casualty. Salvage may encompass towing, re-floating a vessel, or effecting repairs to a ship. Protecting the environment from spillage of oil or other contaminants is also a high priority. Most salvage is carried out by specialist salvage firms with dedicated crew and equipment.

=== Salvage diving techniques ===
Scuba is not authorised for most salvage work by commercial or naval operators due to relatively high risk in comparison to surface supplied techniques, though naval operations may use scuba for non-penetrative work in good visibility and relatively shallow depths.

The choice between surface oriented and saturation diving is based largely on depth and the amount of decompression anticipated.

==== Underwater work techniques used in salvage diving work ====
- Airlift dredging
- Buoyant lifting
  - Lifting bags
- Concrete placement
- Explosive demolition
- Explosive fastening
- Oxy-arc cutting
- Rigging
- Shoring
- Underwater inspection
  - Underwater photography
- Underwater welding
- Waterjetting

=== Hazards common to salvage diving ===
- Fouling and entrapment
- Contamination by dangerous and toxic materials
- Pressure differentials due to water movement
- Unintended explosions

== Organisations ==
In 1978, the U.S. Navy Special Operations Officer (1140) community was established by combining Explosive Ordnance Disposal (EOD) and Expendable Ordnance Management officers with Diving and Salvage officers. "The combination gave a breadth and depth of professionalism to Navy salvage that had not been possible before."

== List of notable salvage operations involving divers ==
- USS Squalus
- Russian submarine Kursk
- SS Egypt
- Costa Concordia
- USS Monitor
- Mary Rose
- Vasa (ship)
- HMS Royal George (1756)

== Gallery ==
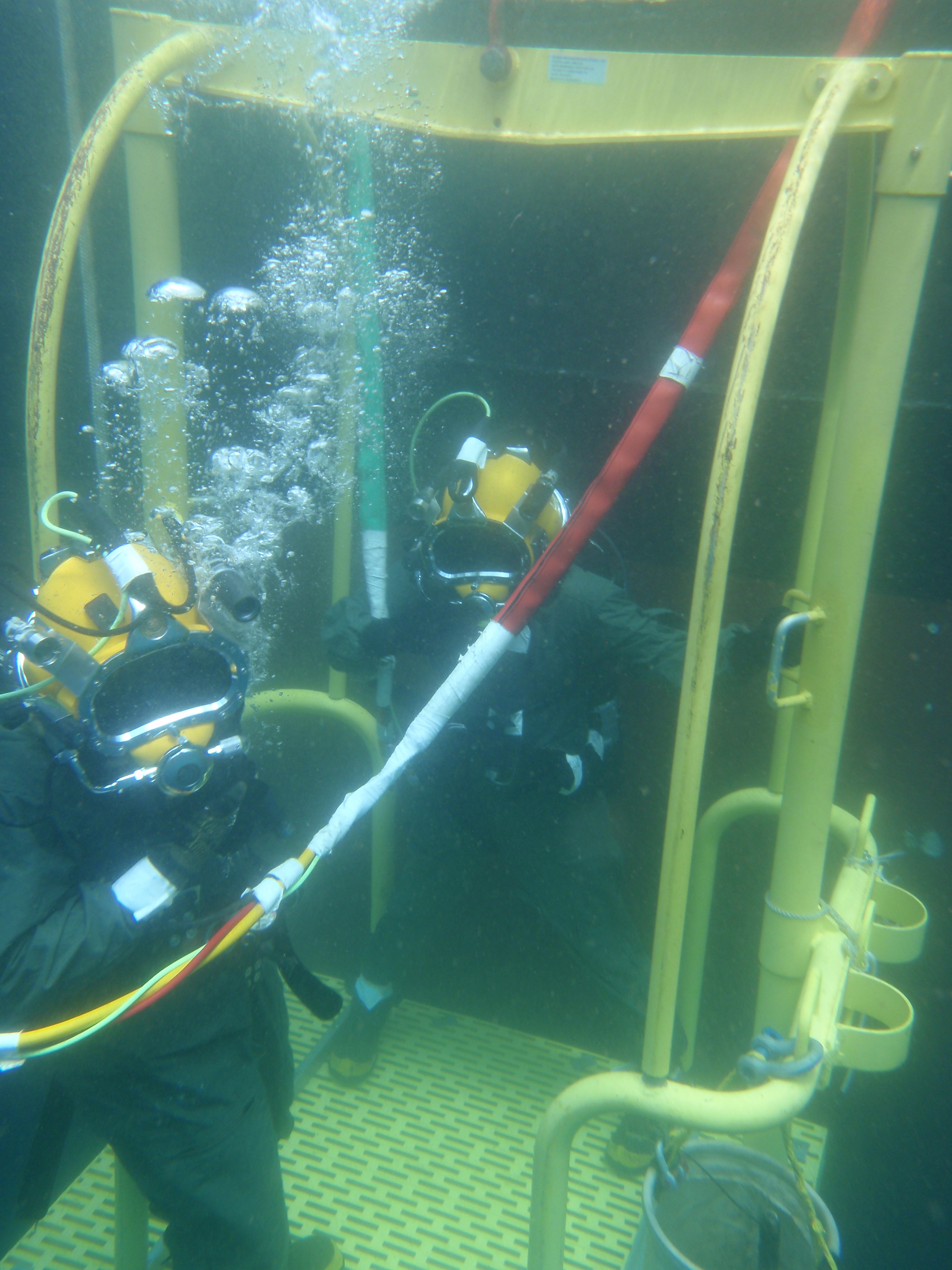
US Navy divers descending to a wreck to recover petroleum from a sunken ship.

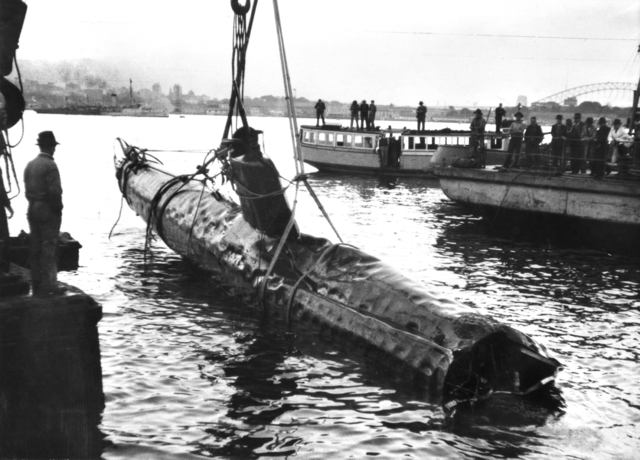
A Japanese Ko-hyoteki class midget submarine, raised in Sydney Harbour

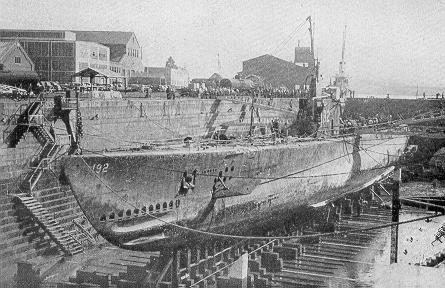
USS Squalus in drydock after salvage

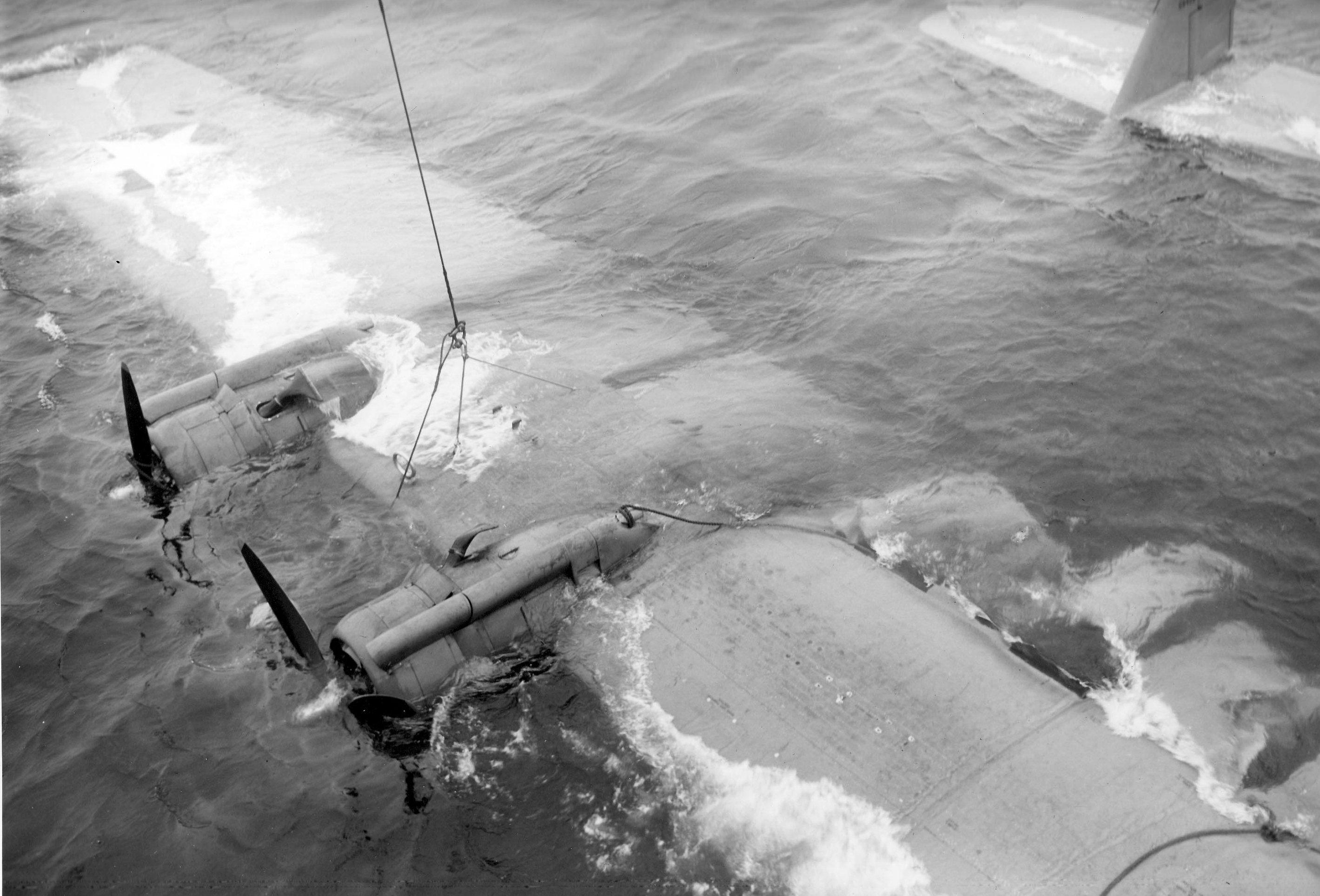
Salvage of a U.S. Navy Consolidated PBY-5 Catalina at Casco Cove, Attu, Alaska (USA), on 27 August 1943.

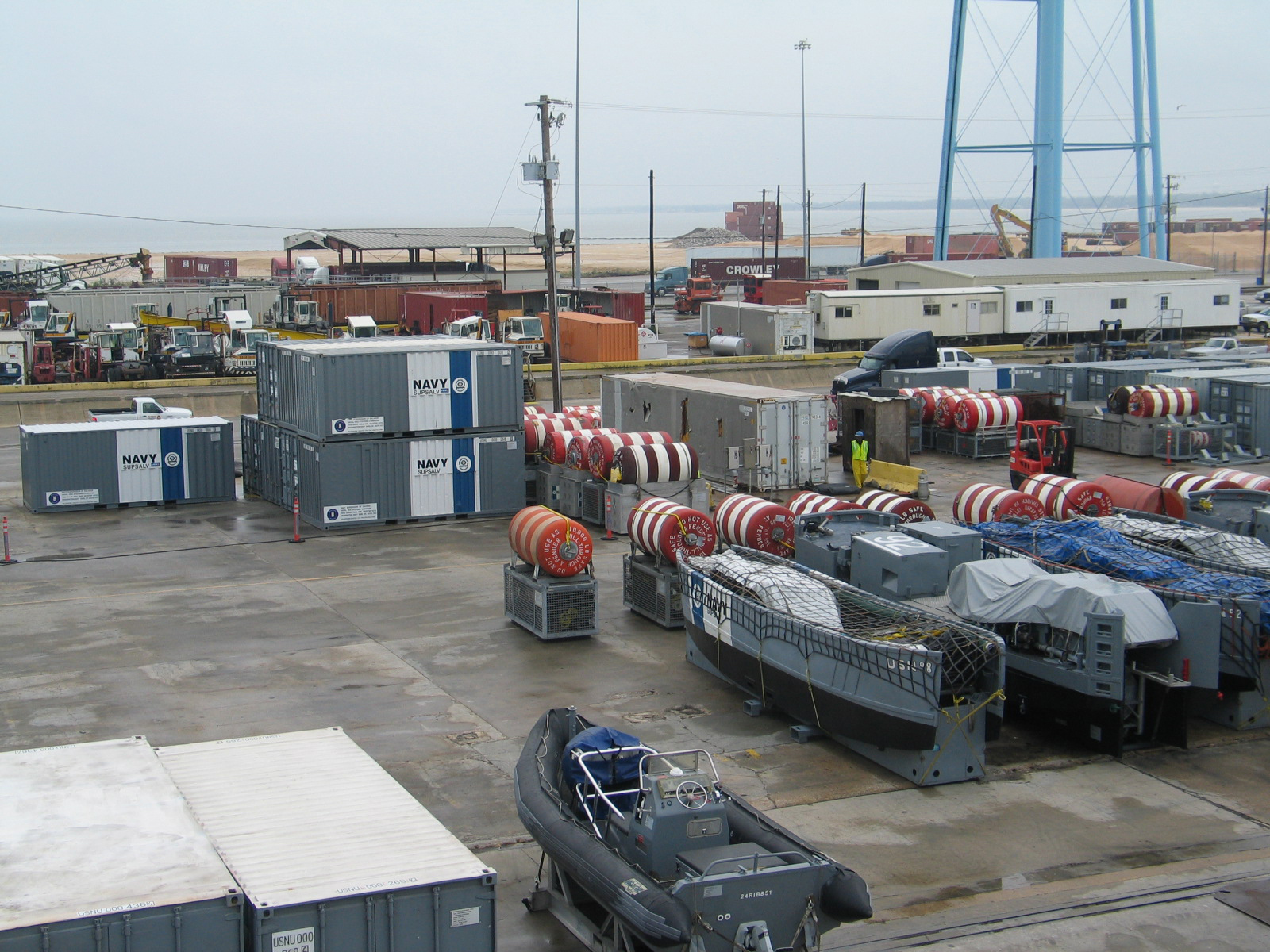
US Navy emergency ship salvage equipment stored in Gulfport, Mississippi.

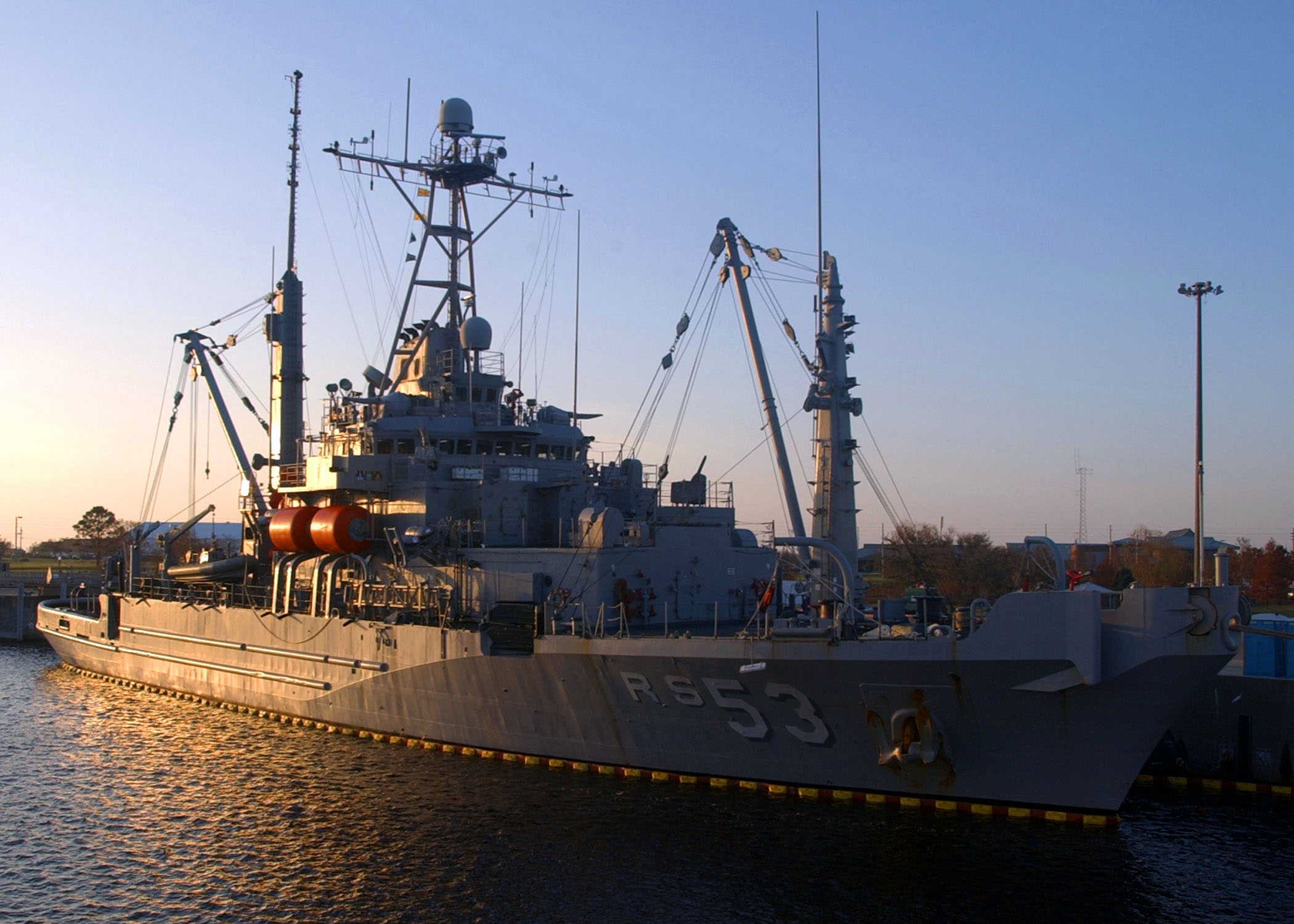
The rescue and salvage ship USS Grapple (ARS 53), prepares to get underway for salvage and diving operations in the aftermath of Hurricane Katrina.

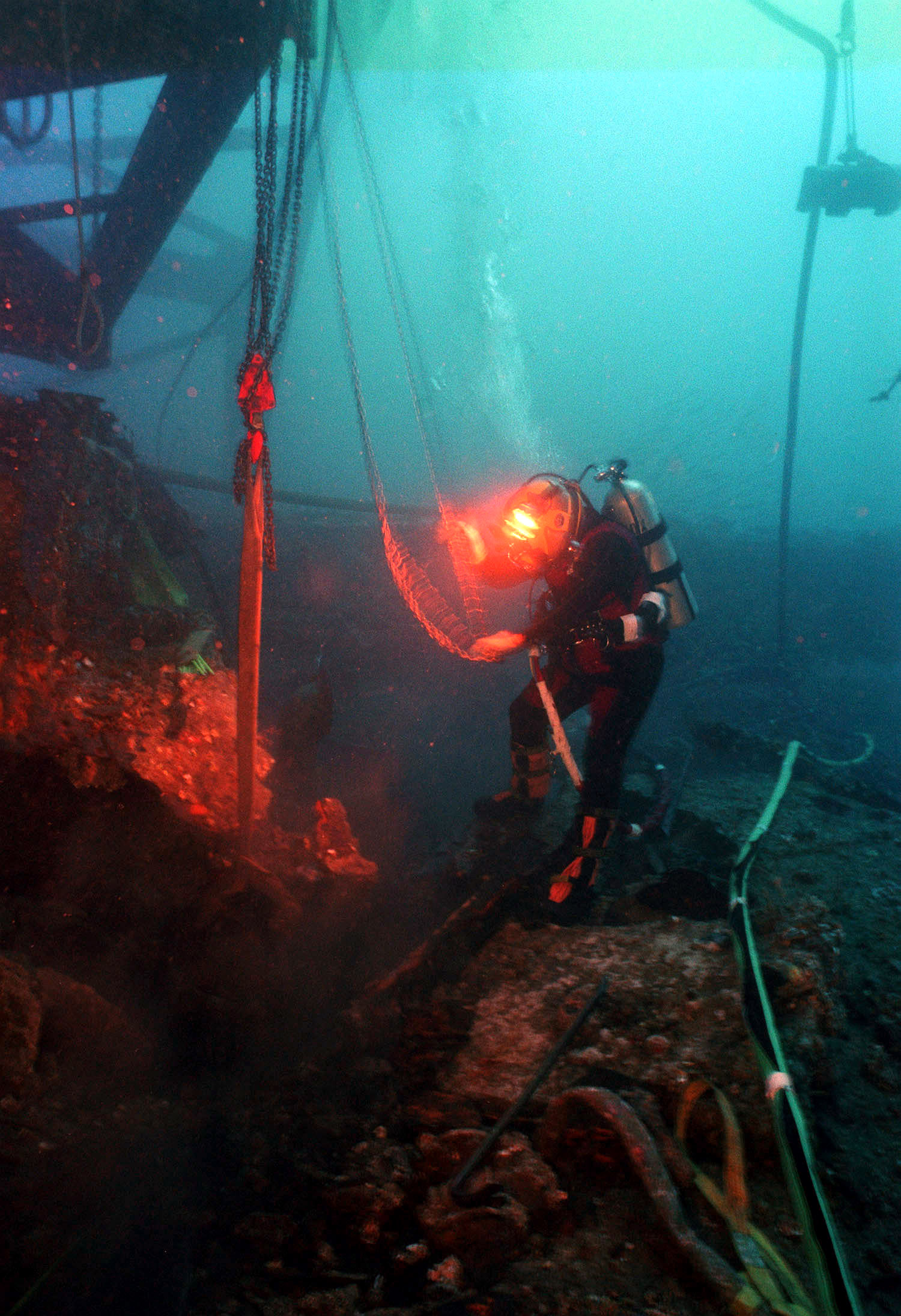
Diver over the wreck of USS Monitor

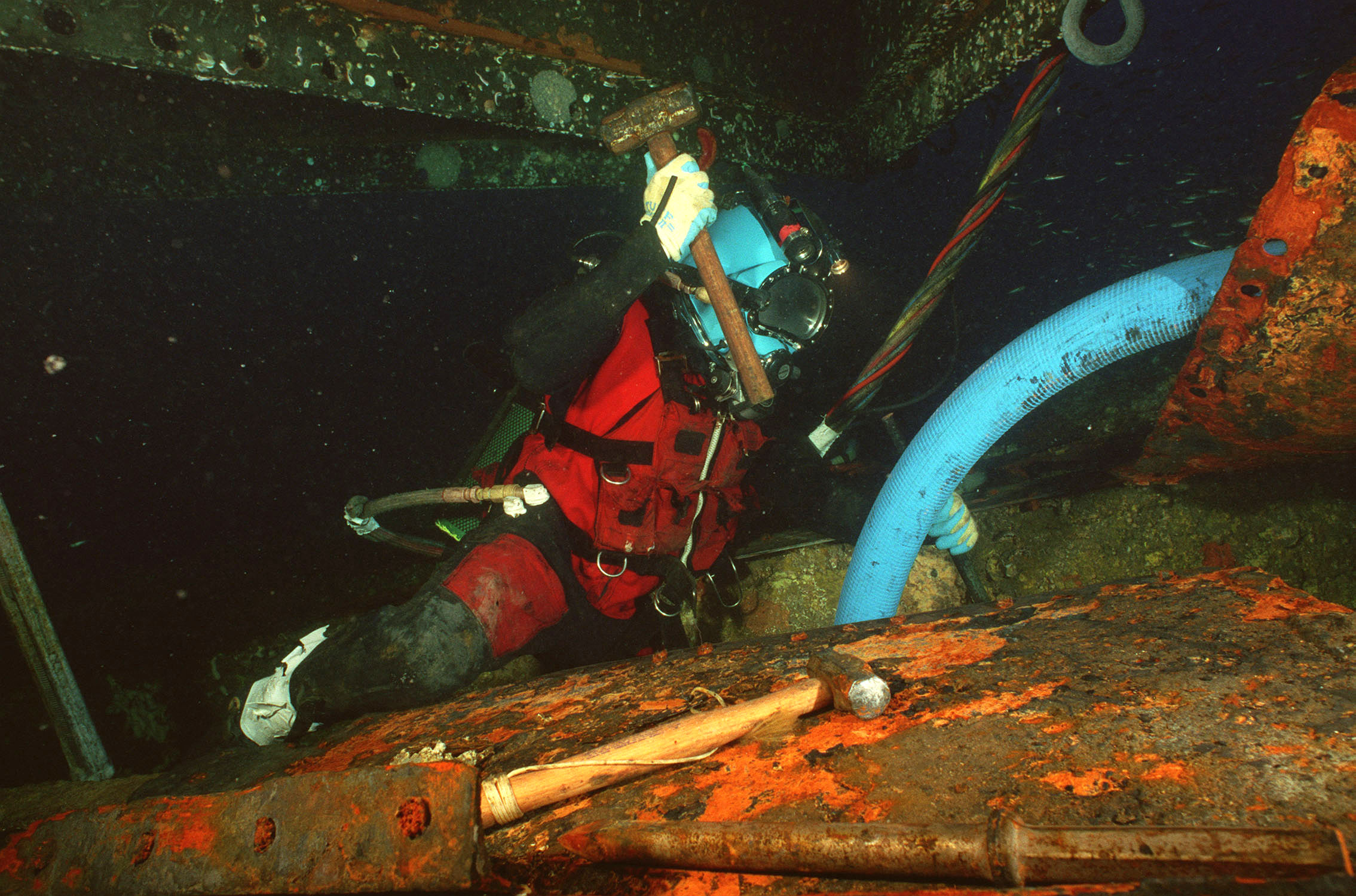
Diver working on USS Monitor

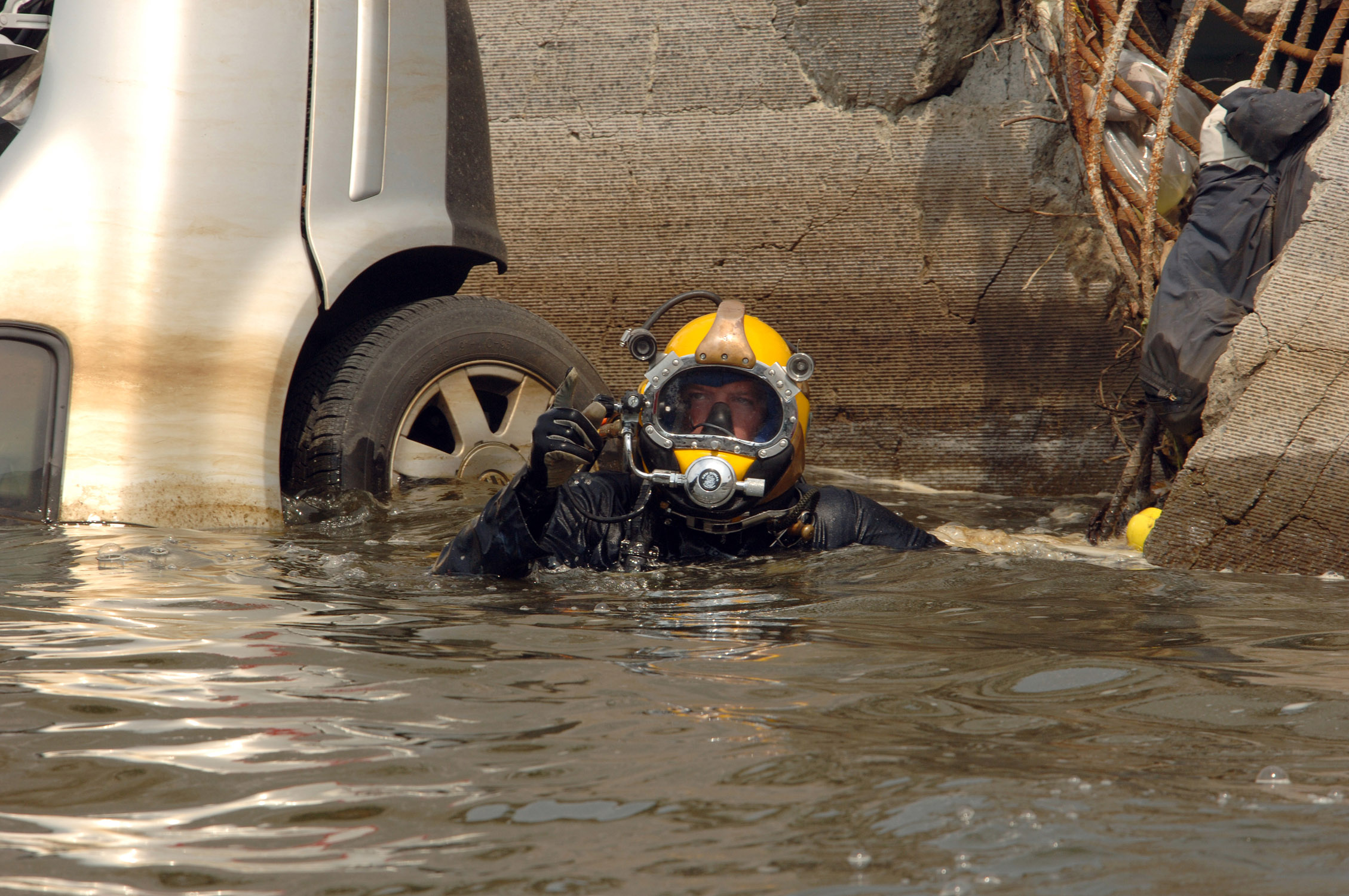

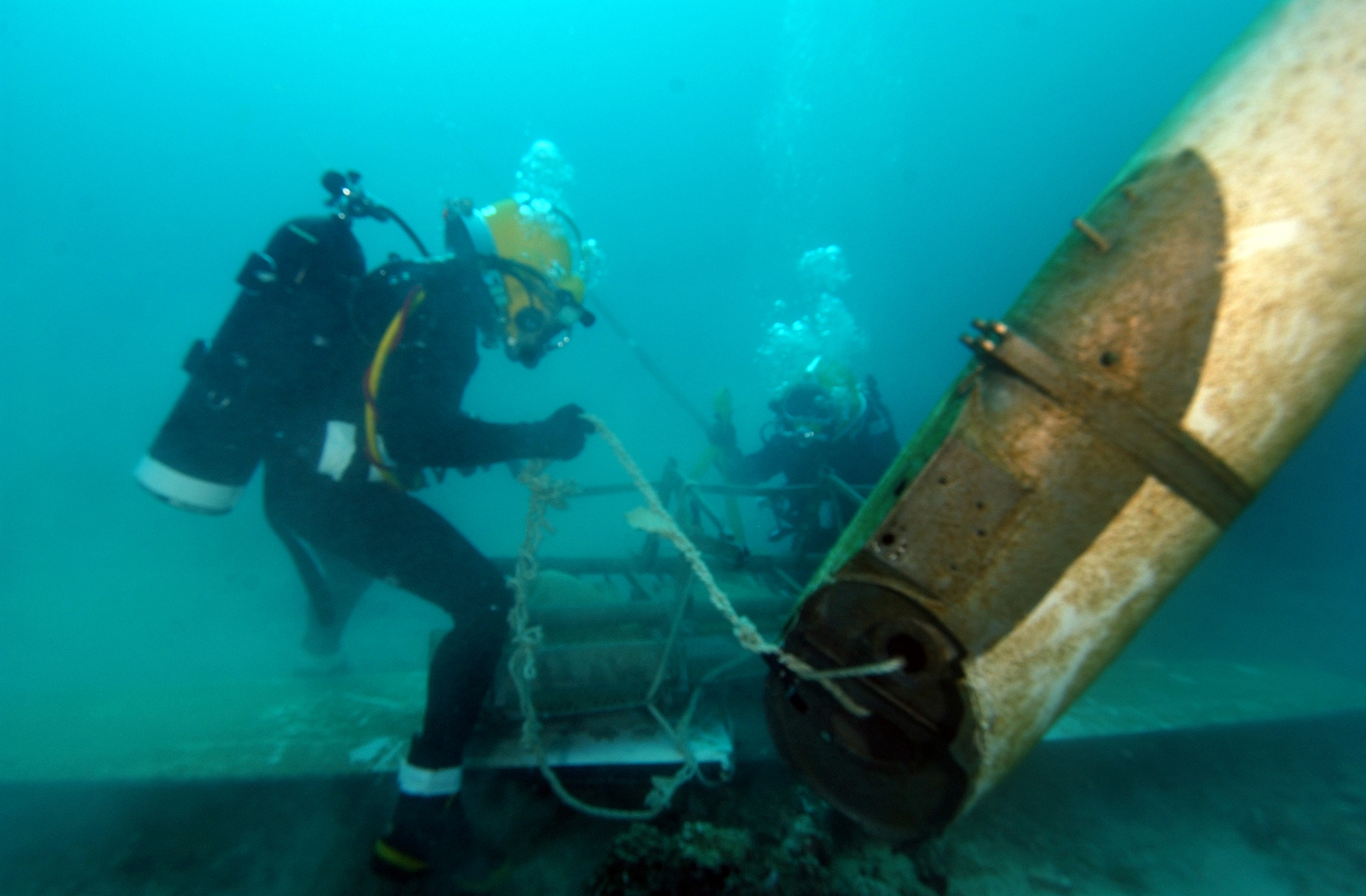

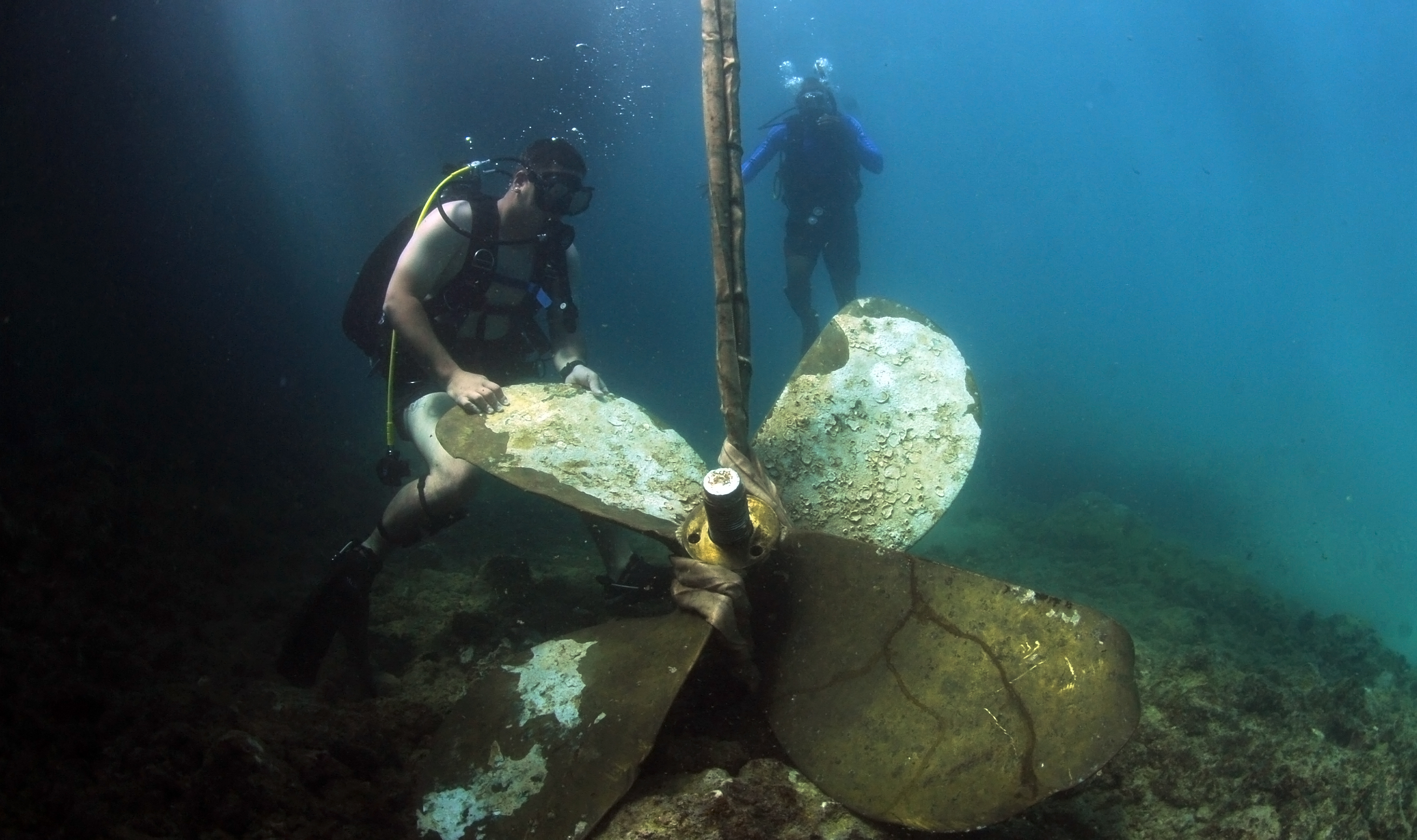

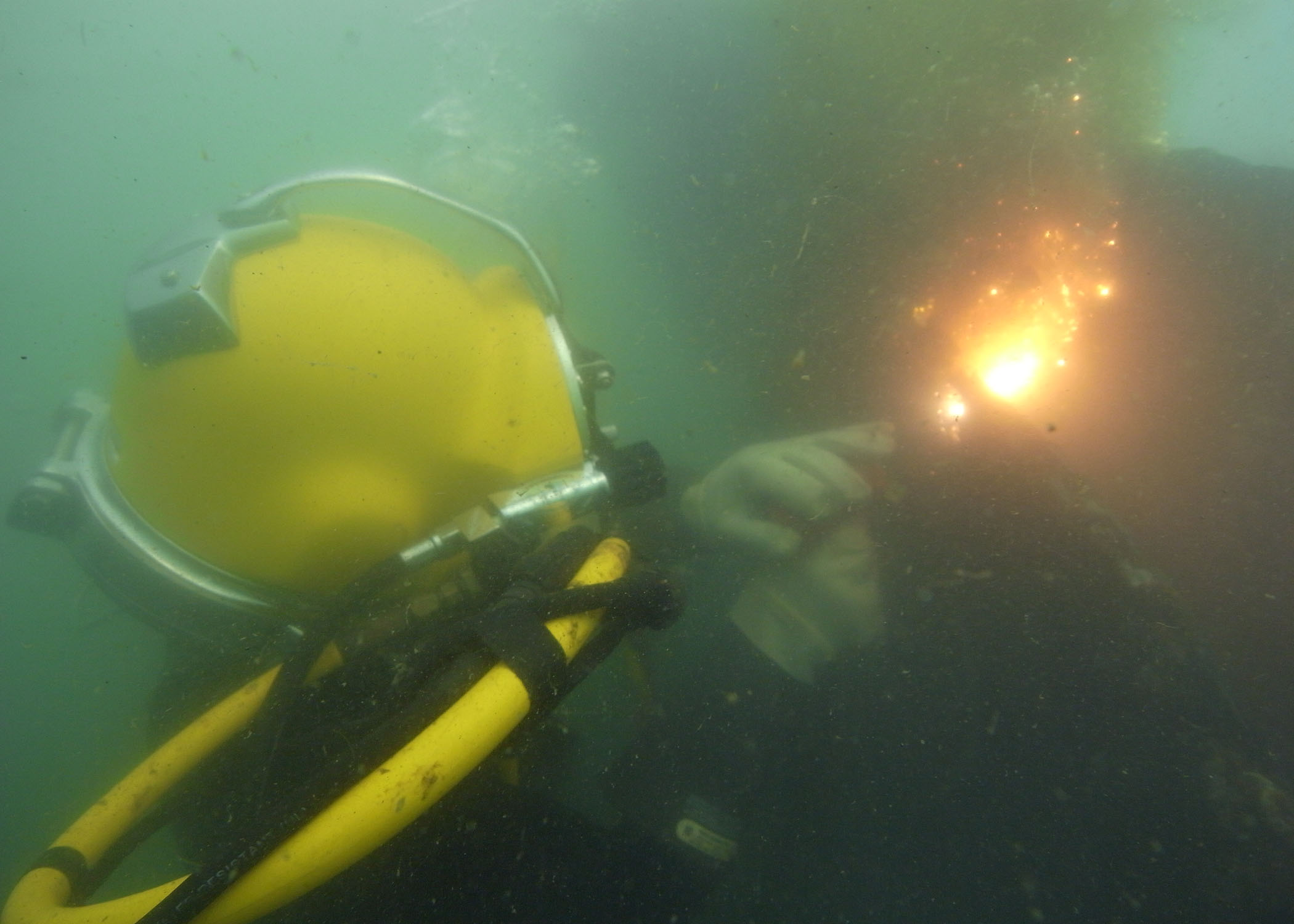

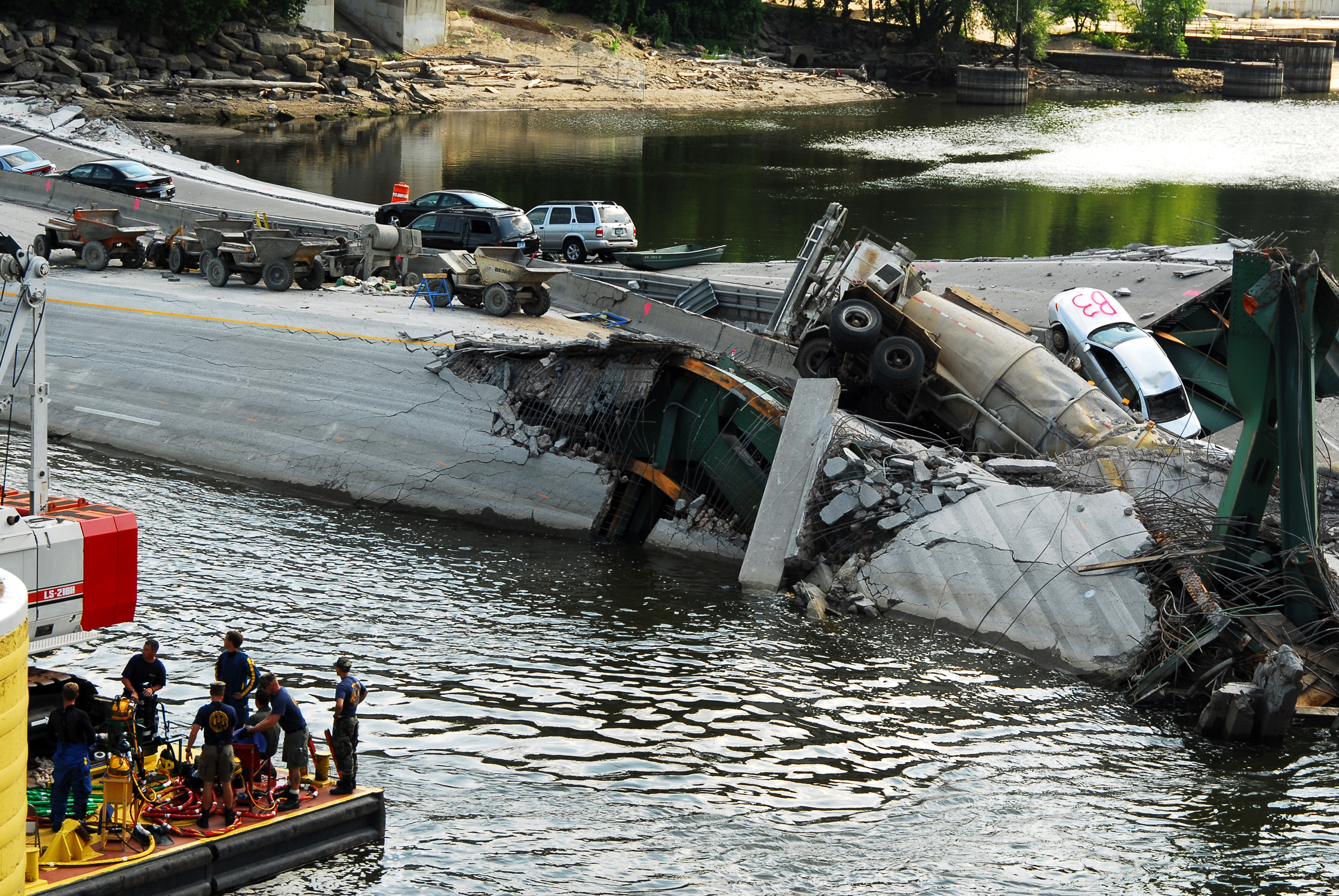

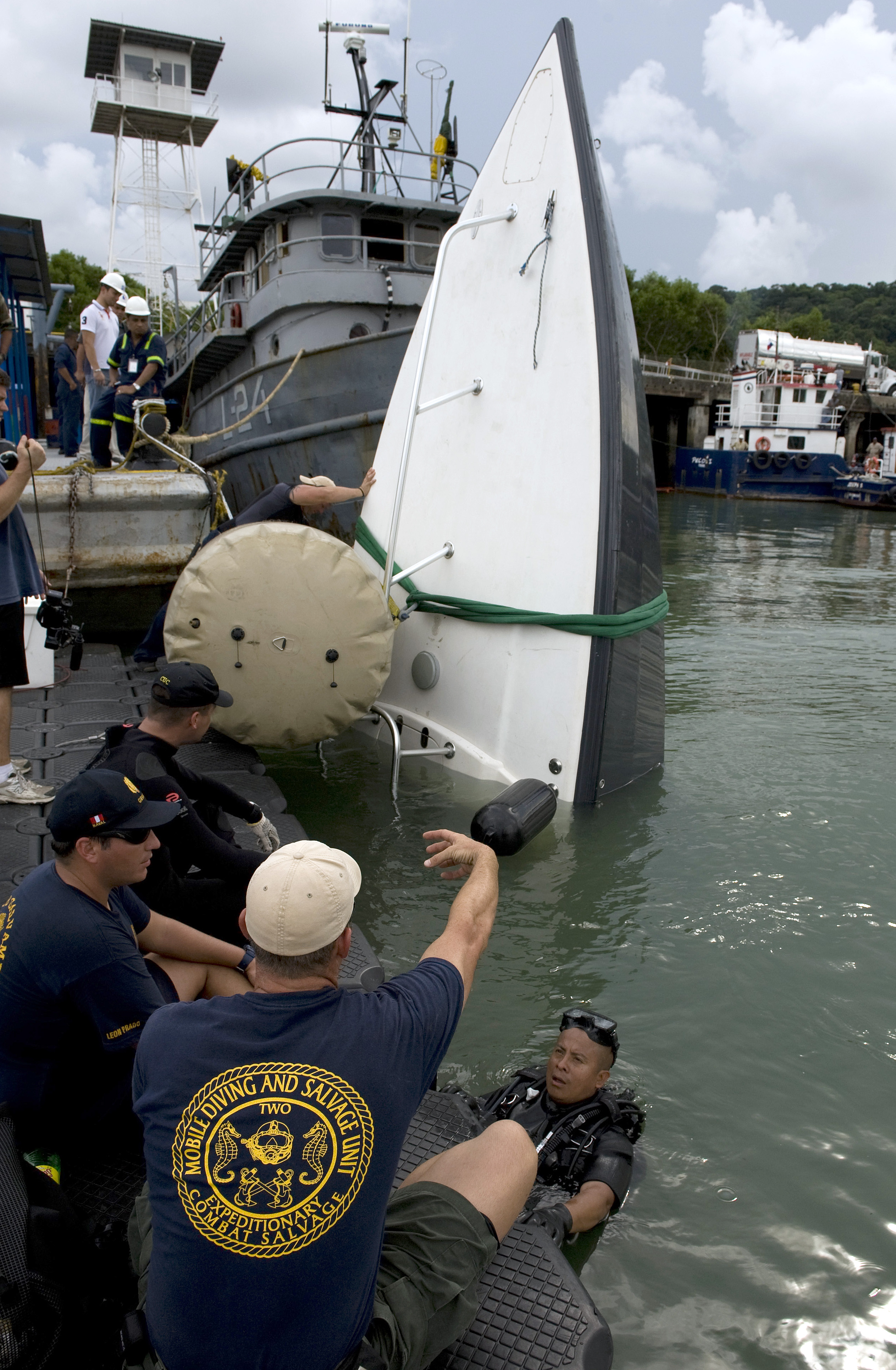

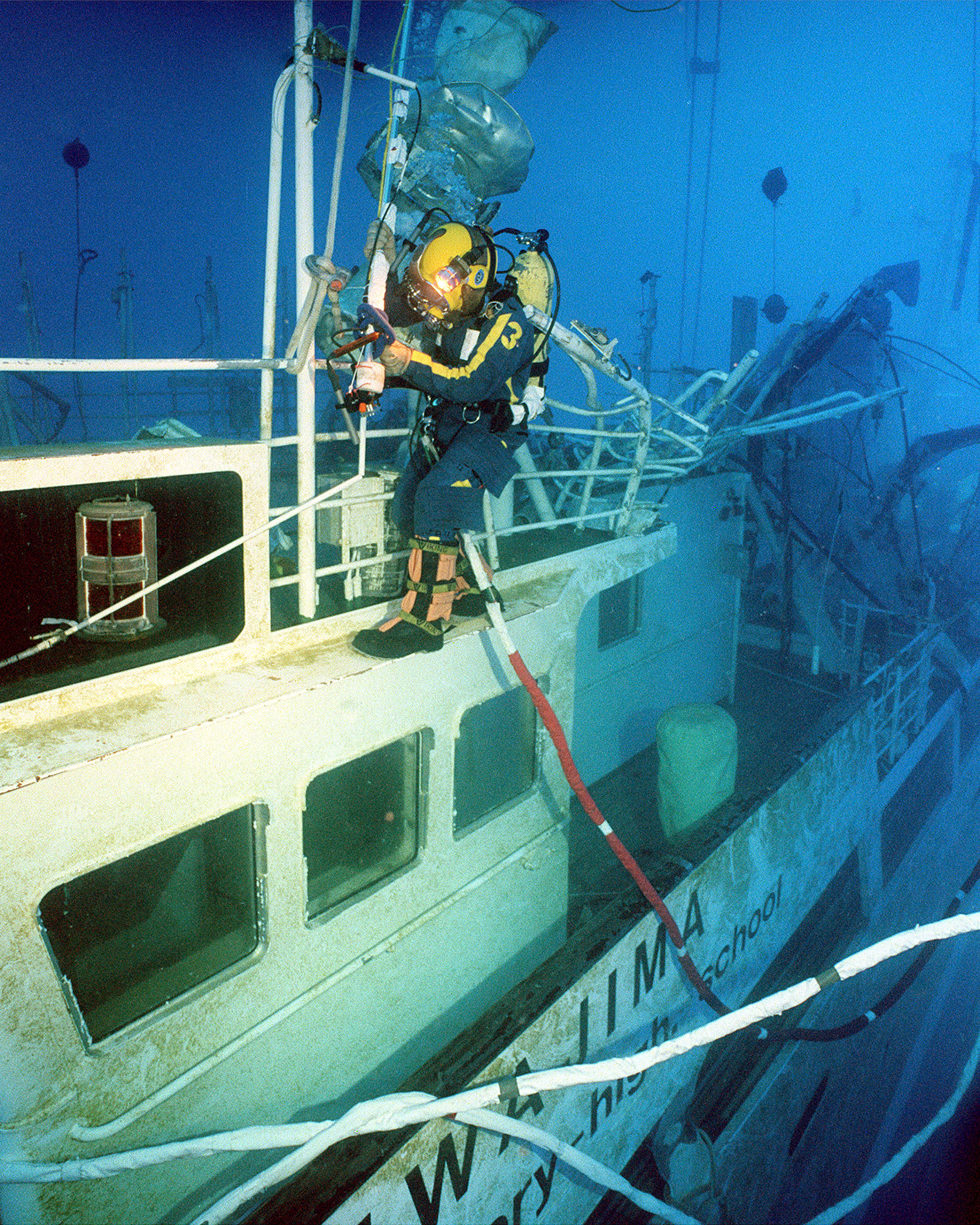

== See also ==
- Marine salvage – Recovering a ship or cargo after a maritime casualty
- Underwater search and recovery – Locating and recovering underwater objects
