= Diving equipment =

Equipment used to facilitate underwater diving

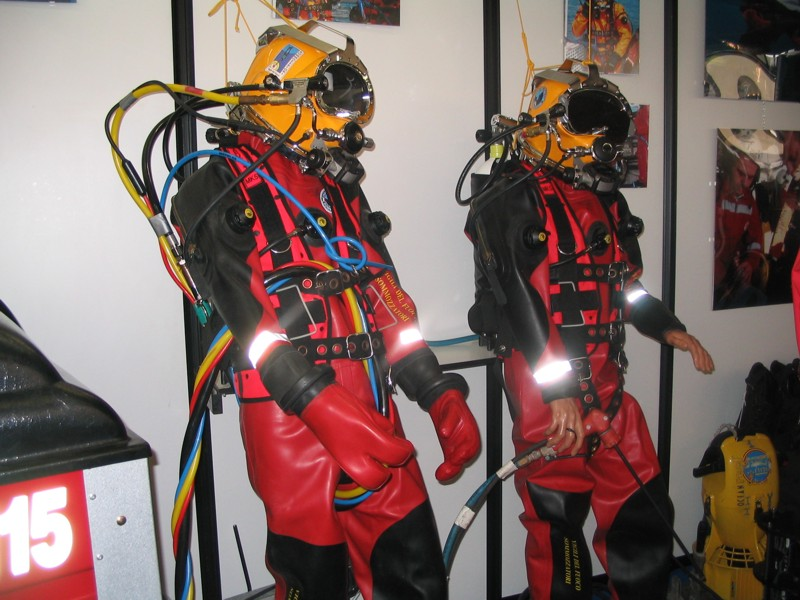
- Surface supplied commercial diving equipment on display at a trade show
- Other names: Dive gear
- Uses: Facilitate underwater diving operations

Diving equipment, or underwater diving equipment, is equipment used by underwater divers to make diving activities possible, easier, safer and/or more comfortable. This may be equipment primarily intended for this purpose, or equipment intended for other purposes which is found to be suitable for diving use.

The fundamental item of diving equipment used by divers other than freedivers, is underwater breathing apparatus, such as scuba equipment, and surface-supplied diving equipment, but there are other important items of equipment that make diving safer, more convenient or more efficient. Diving equipment used by recreational scuba divers, also known as scuba gear, is mostly personal equipment carried by the diver, but professional divers, particularly when operating in the surface supplied or saturation mode, use a large amount of support equipment not carried by the diver.

Equipment which is used for underwater work or other activities which is not directly related to the activity of diving, or which has not been designed or modified specifically for underwater use by divers is not considered to be diving equipment.

== Classes of underwater breathing apparatus ==
The diving mode is largely defined by the type of breathing apparatus used.

- Surface-supplied diving – mostly used in professional diving. This category includes:
  - Surface oriented surface-supplied diving (Bounce diving), where the diver starts and finishes the dive at normal atmospheric pressure.
    - Standard diving dress – mostly used in professional diving. Usually free-flow open circuit air, but occasionally semi-closed circuit mixed gas. Mainly of historical interest now.
    - Surface-supplied open circuit free-flow air diving, using compressed atmospheric air as the breathing gas.
    - Surface-supplied mixed gas diving, using helium based, nitrox, or trimix breathing gases. Usually using lightweight demand helmets, sometimes with helium reclaim systems.
    - Airline or Hookah diving.
    - "Compressor diving" – a rudimentary form of surface-supplied diving used in the Philippines by artisanal fishermen.
    - Recreational forms like snuba.
  - Saturation diving, where the diver remains under pressure in an underwater habitat or saturation spread between underwater excursions.
- Scuba diving – The use of self-contained underwater breathing apparatus. This category includes:
  - Open-circuit scuba consisting of diving cylinder(s) and diving regulator(s)
  - Rebreather diving, closed-circuit or semi-closed-circuit scuba
- Freediving or breathhold diving, where the diver completes the dive on a single breath of air taken at the surface before the dive.
  - Snorkelling allows breathing at the surface with the face submerged, and is used as an adjunct to free diving and scuba.
- Atmospheric diving suits and other submersibles which isolate the diver from the ambient environment. These are not considered here.
- Liquid breathing systems are still hypothetical and at an early experimental stage. It is hoped that some day practical systems will allow very deep diving. This is not considered here.
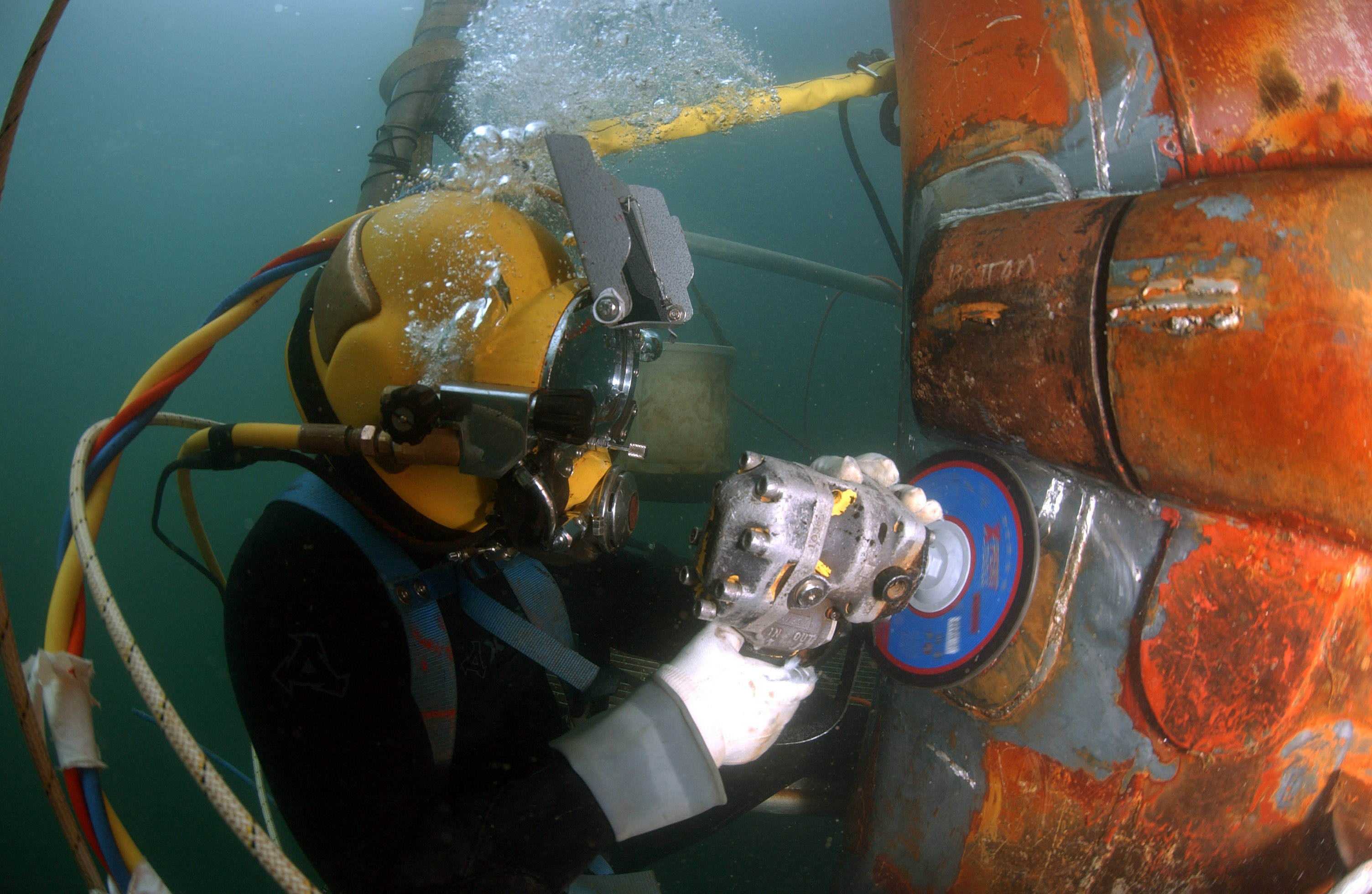
A US Navy diver at work. The umbilical supplying air from the surface is clearly visible

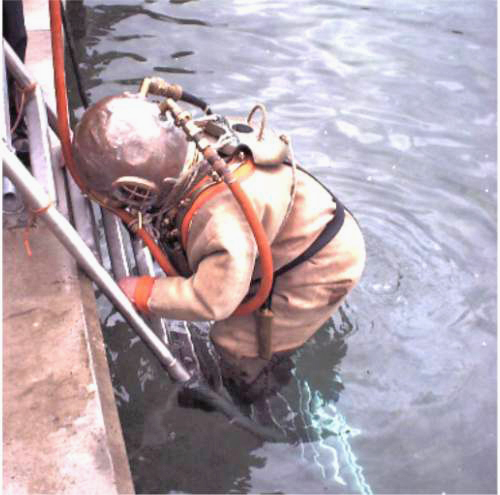
Diver in standard diving dress entering the water at Stoney Cove, England

Scuba diver with single cylinder and open circuit regulator

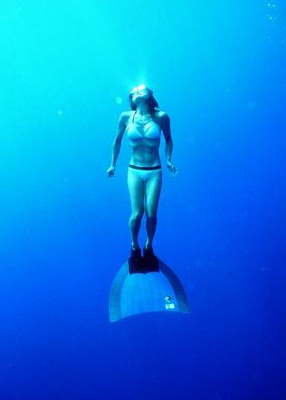
Free-diver with monofin, ascending

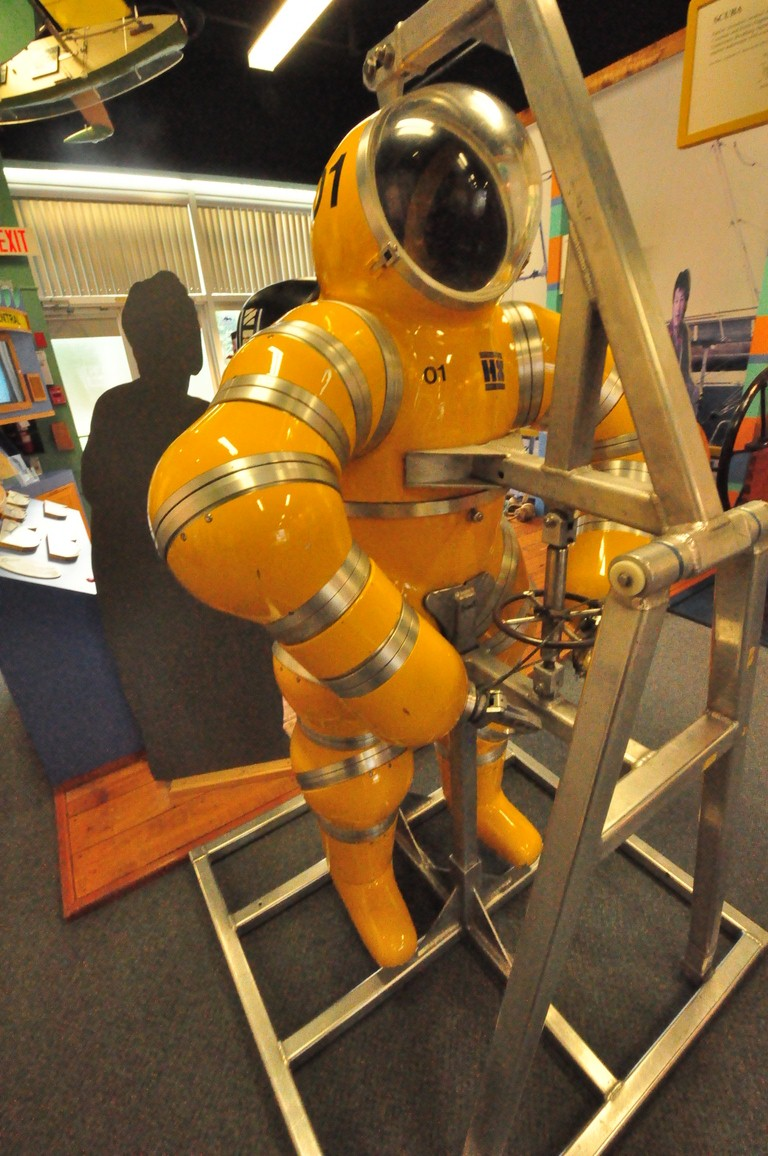
The Newtsuit is an atmospheric diving suit which has fully articulated rotary joints in the arms and legs.

== Personal diving equipment ==
This is the diving equipment worn by or carried by the diver for personal protection or comfort, or to facilitate the diving aspect of the activity, and may include a selection from:

=== Underwater breathing apparatus ===
- Scuba equipment: Primary cylinder(s), carried back-mounted or side mounted and open circuit regulator(s), or rebreather sets. Alternative air source such as bailout bottle or pony bottle, and decompression cylinders and their associated regulators. Secondary demand valve (Octopus). Sometimes a full-face diving mask is used.
- Surface-supplied equipment: Helmet or full face mask, diver's umbilical, airline, bailout block, bailout cylinder and regulator.
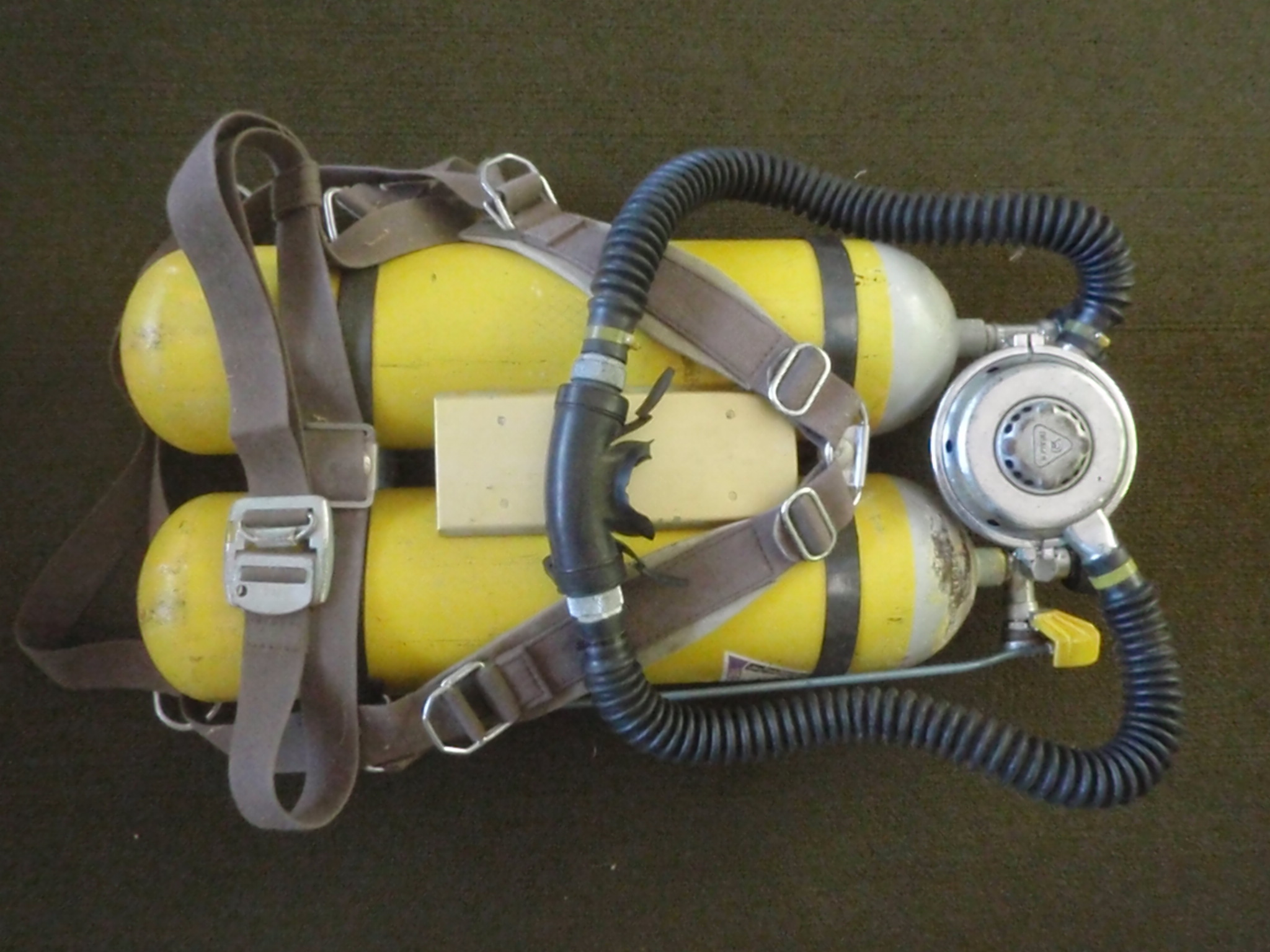
Early twin cylinder set with twin hose regulator

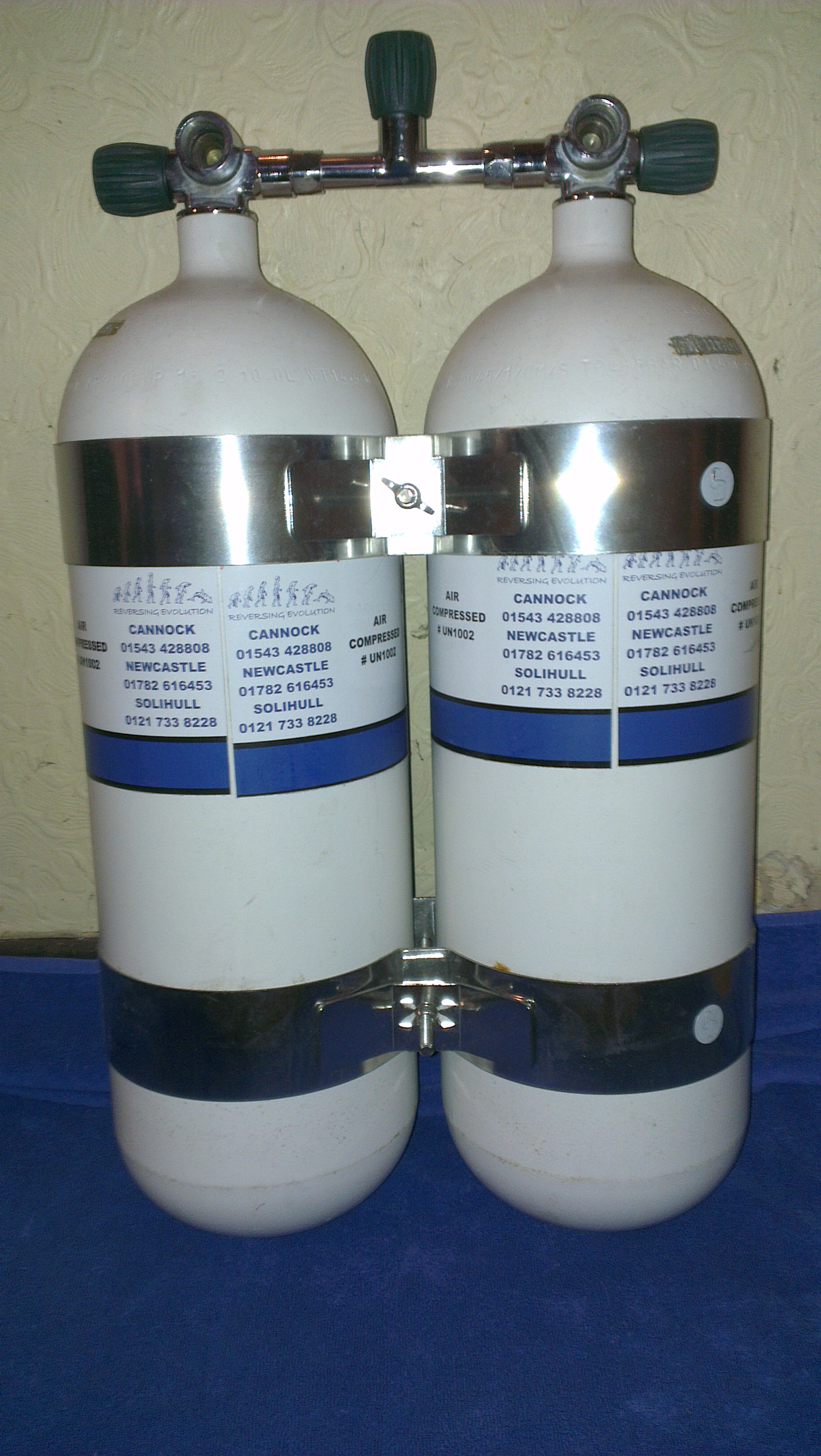
Twin scuba cylinders with isolation manifold

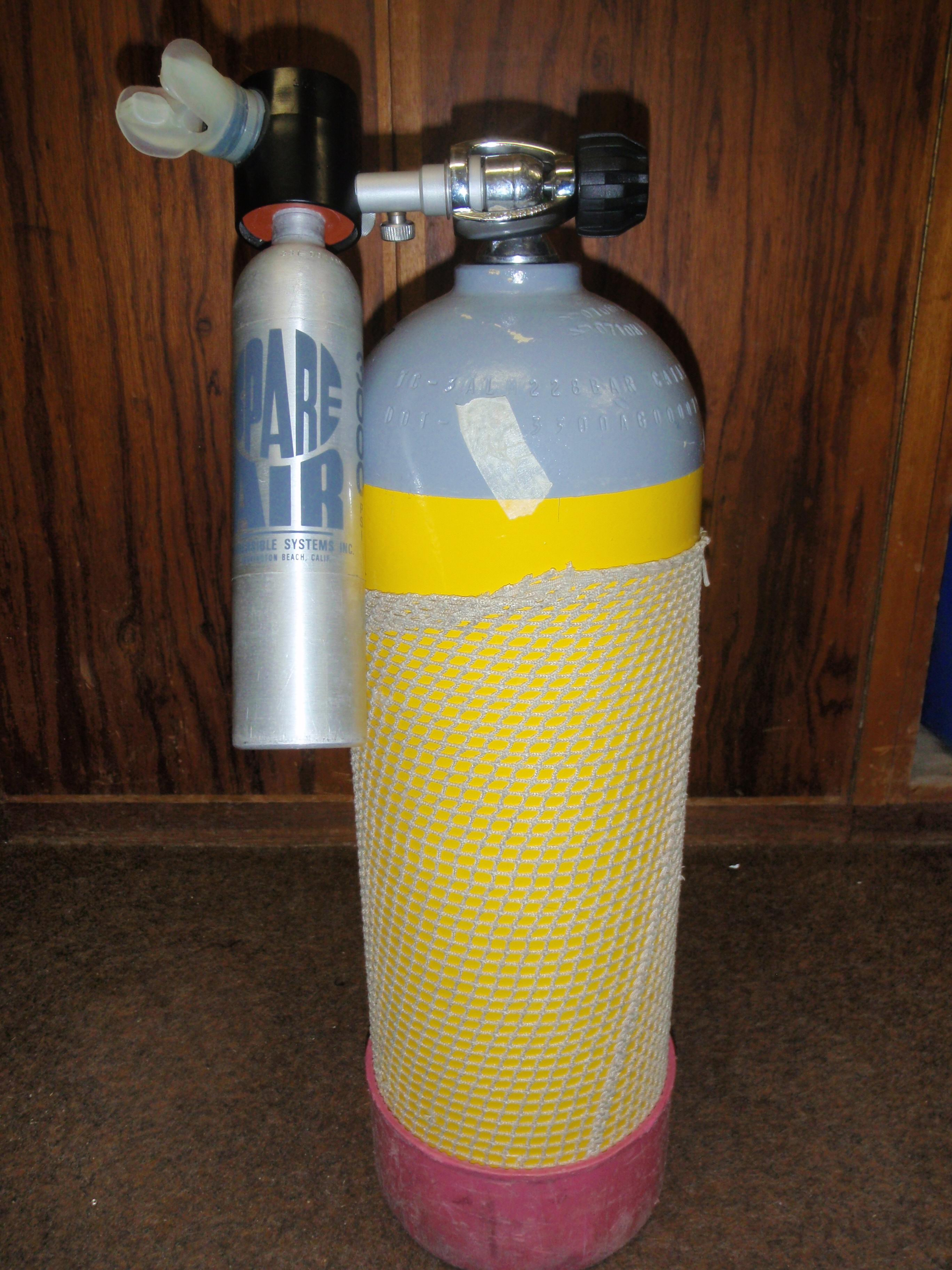
Charging a small bailout cylinder from a larger aluminium scuba cylinder

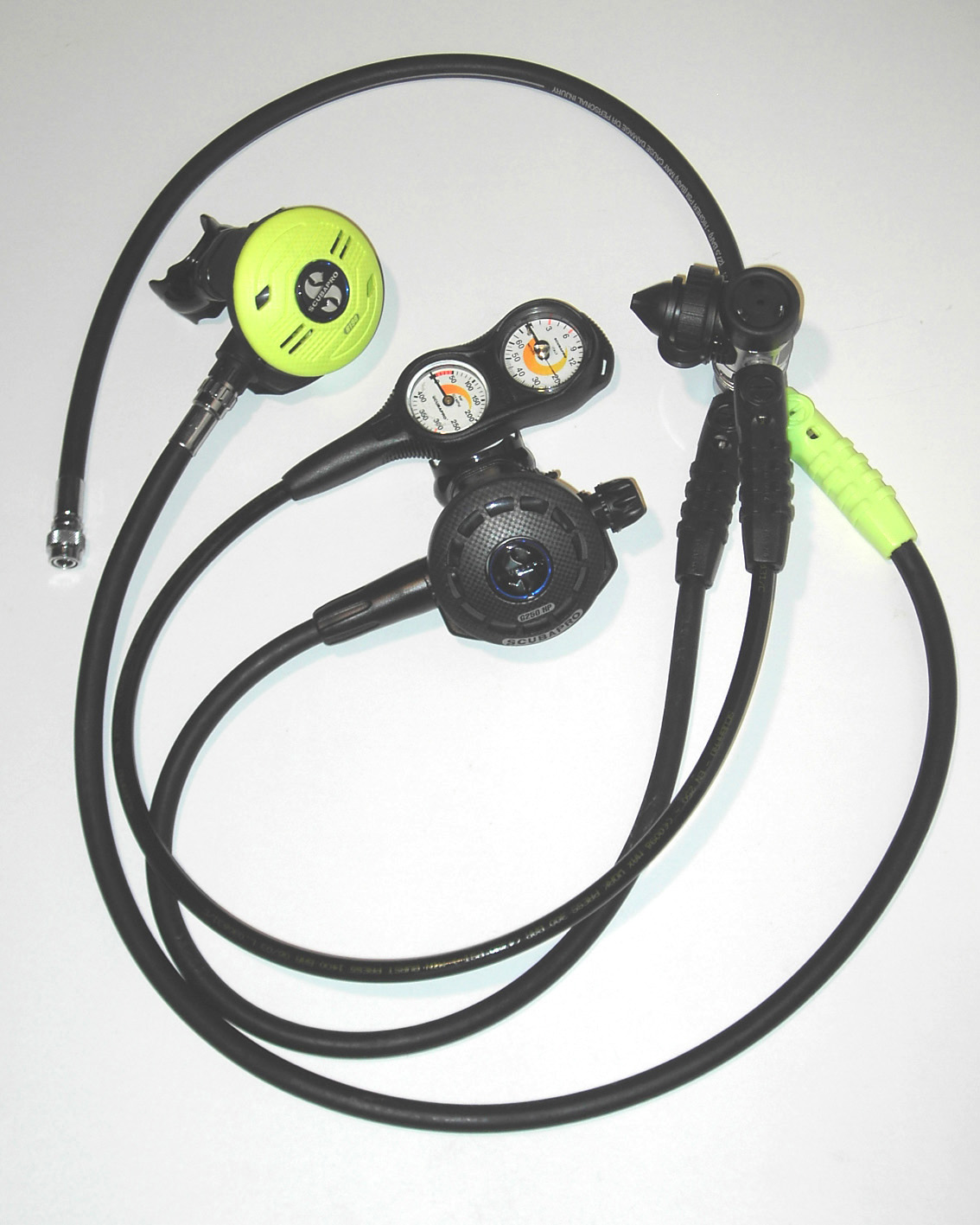
Scuba regulator: First stage with primary and secondary demand valves, submersible pressure gauge and low pressure hose for BC inflation.

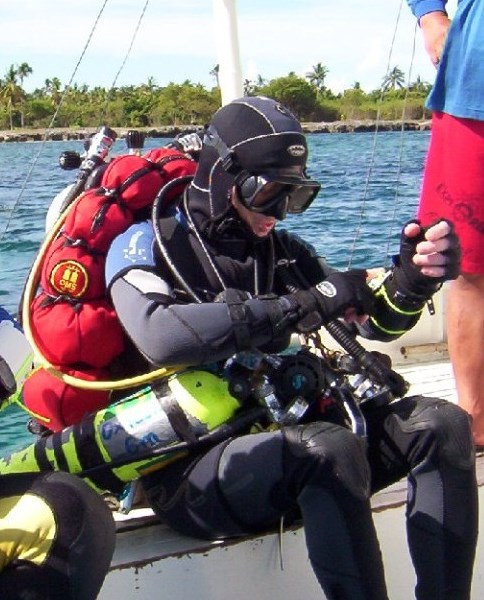
Technical diver with back mounted open circuit scuba and sling mounted decompression cylinders

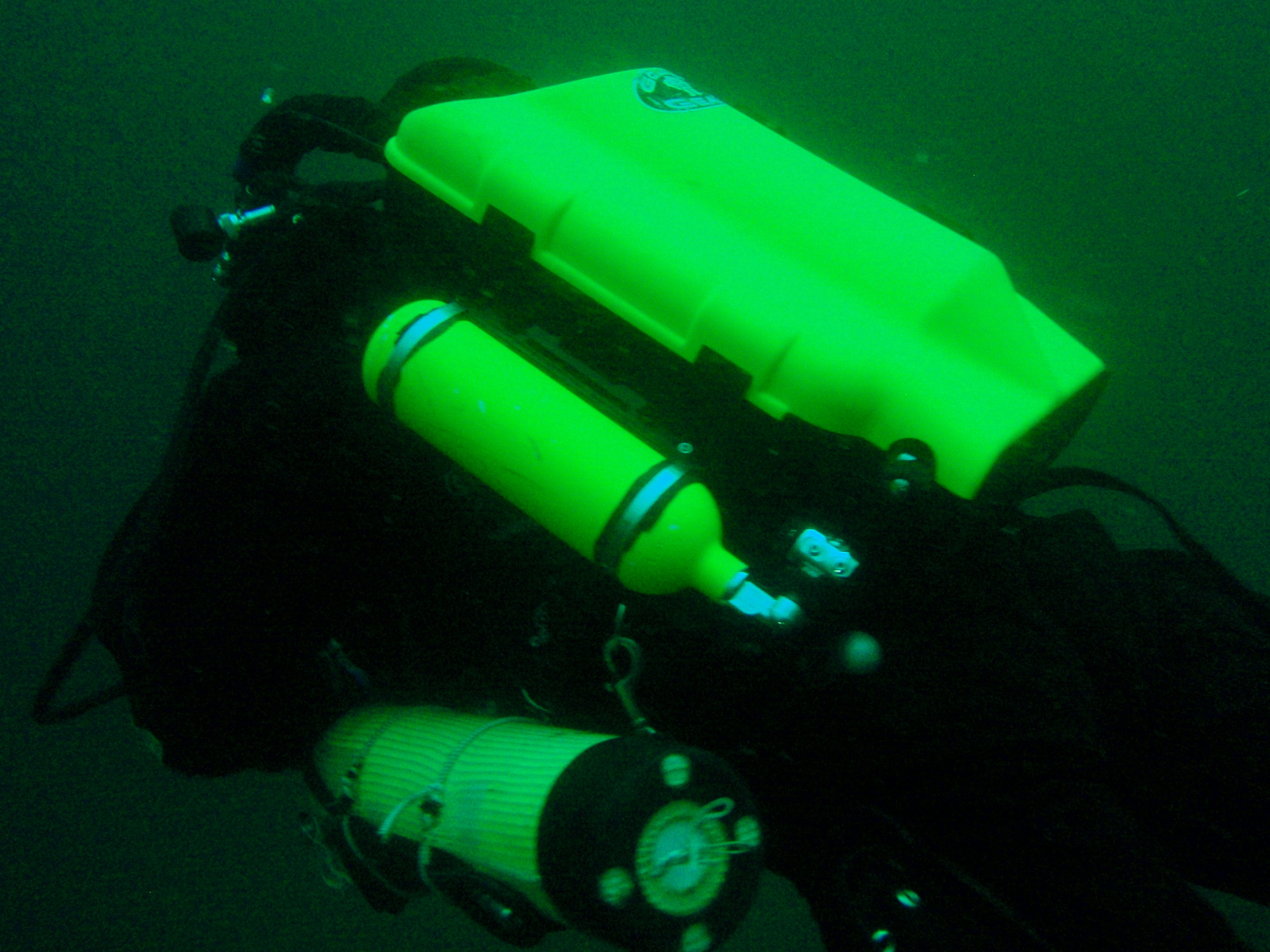
Diving with a closed circuit rebreather

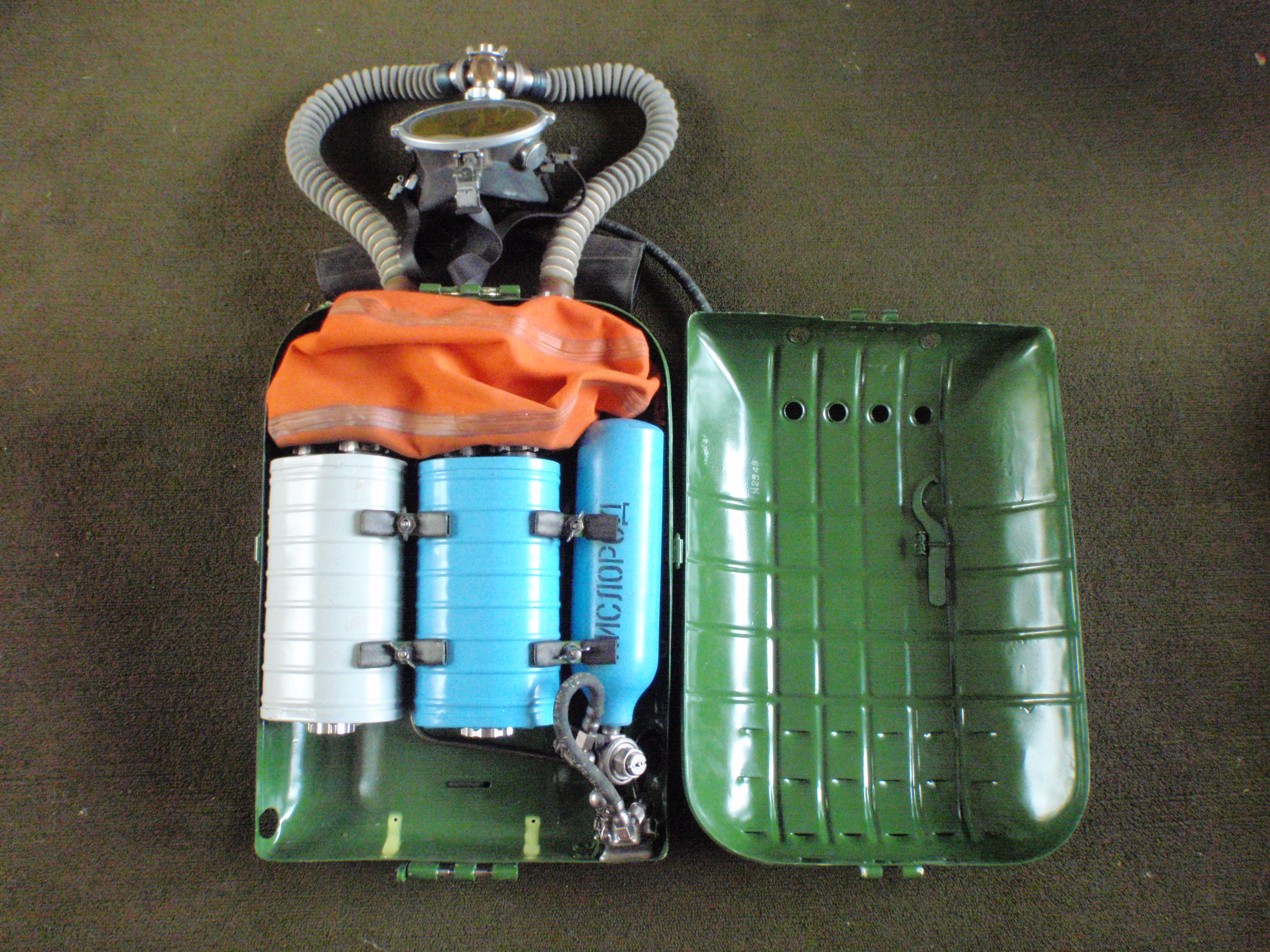
Russian made IDA-71 rebreather set

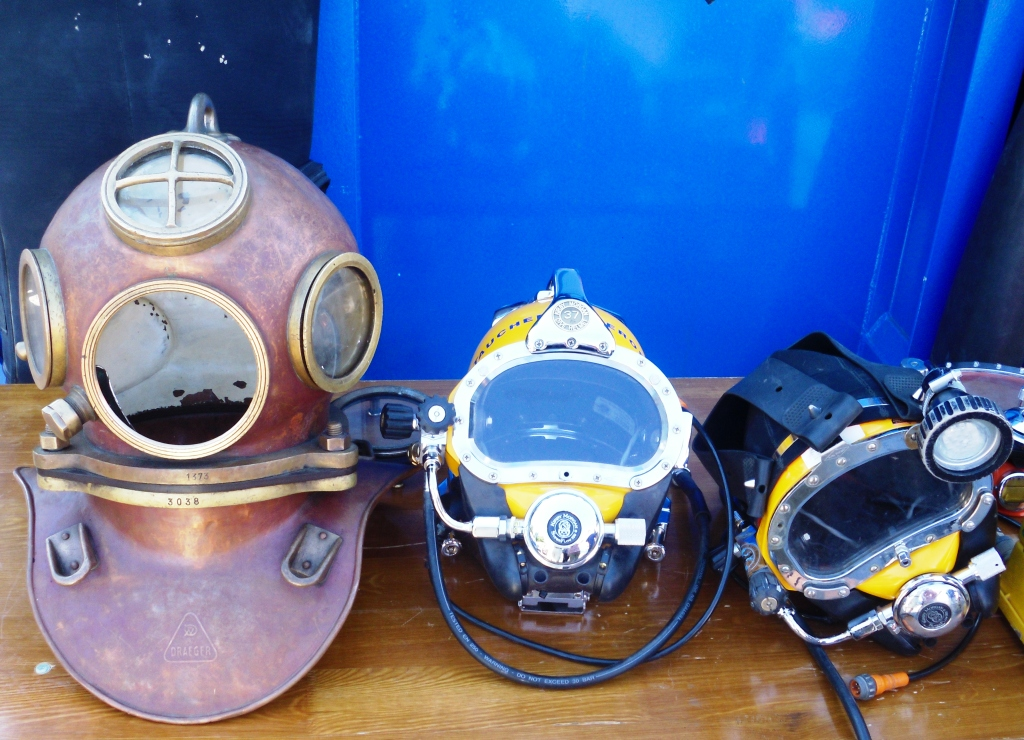
Heavy standard diving helmet, lightweight demand helmet and band mask

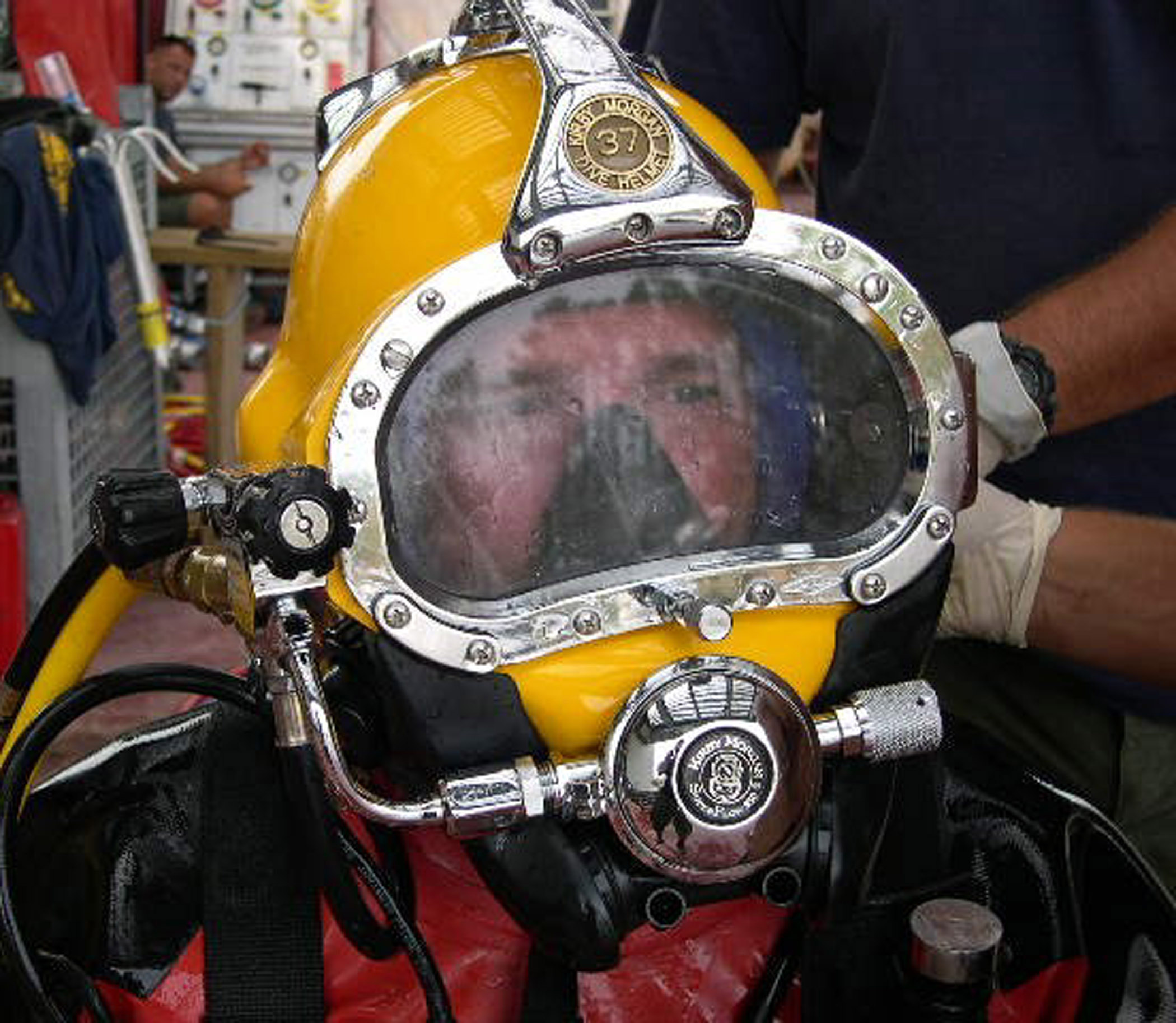
Diver wearing lightweight demand helmet

=== Environmental protection ===
The underwater environment usually requires a diver to wear thermal, sting and abrasion protection.

- In cold water, a diving suit such as a dry suit (at temperatures of 0-10 °C), a wet suit (at temperatures of 21-25 °C), or a Hot water suit (surface supplied diving only) is necessary.
- Boiler suit overalls are often worn over the thermal protection suit by commercial divers as abrasion protection for the more easily damaged and expensive diving suit.
- In very warm water (temperatures of 26-30 °C), many types of tough, long, everyday clothing provide protection, as well as purpose made garments such as dive skins (made of lycra) and shorty wetsuits. In some cases, simple regular swimsuits are also used.
- Diving gloves, including wetsuit gloves and dry gloves, mitts, and three-finger mitts
- Diving suit hoods are worn mainly for thermal protection, but also provide some impact protection and some protection from environmental contact with contaminants and stinging animals like jellyfish.
- Diving boots - With dry suits, the boots are usually integrated.
- Safety helmet for scuba diving. (Not part of the breathing apparatus.)
- Diving chain mail may be used as protection against bites by large marine animals
- Diver's cages may be used as protection against large predators
- Atmospheric diving suit provides complete isolation from the environment
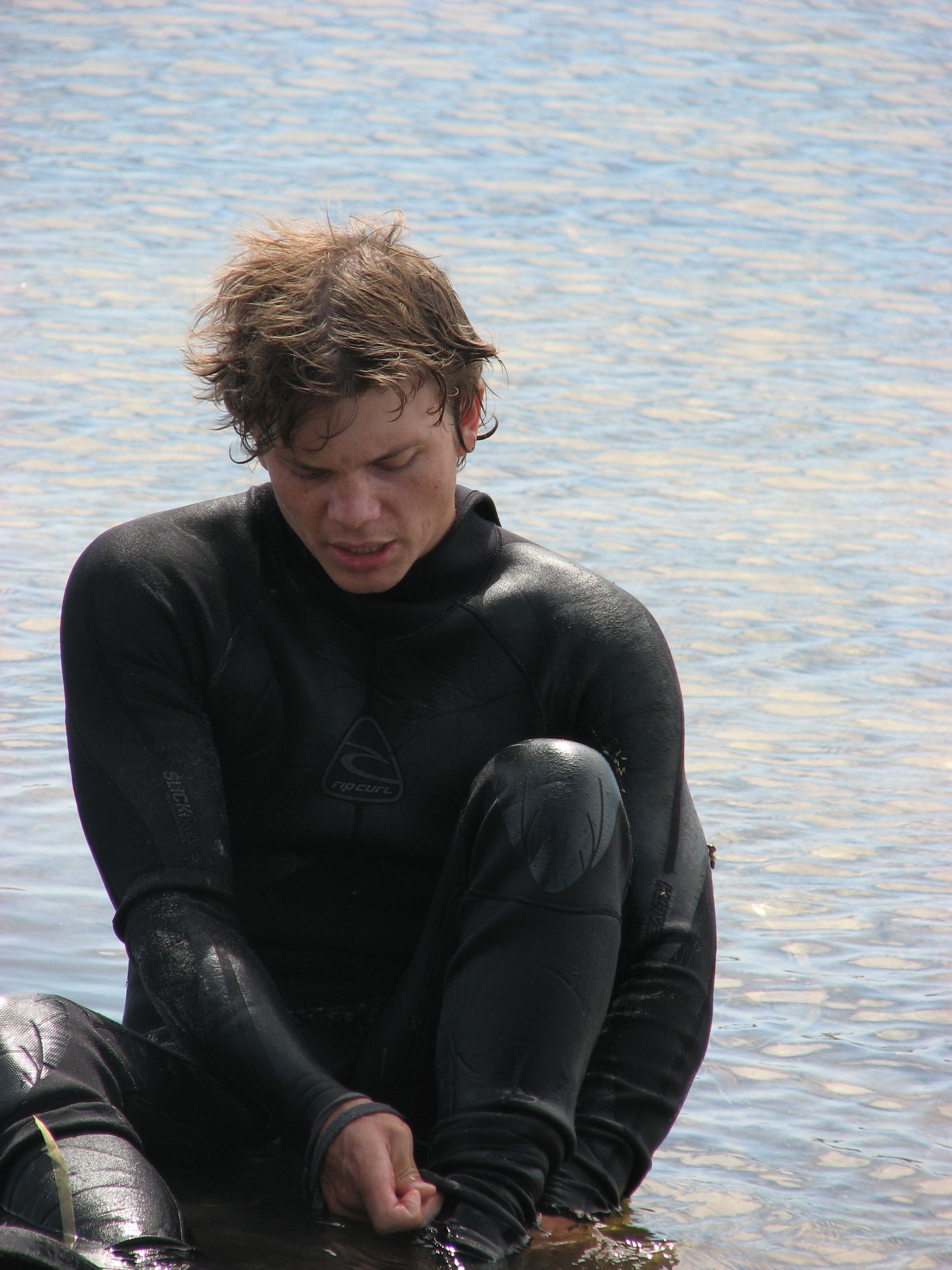
Full wet suit

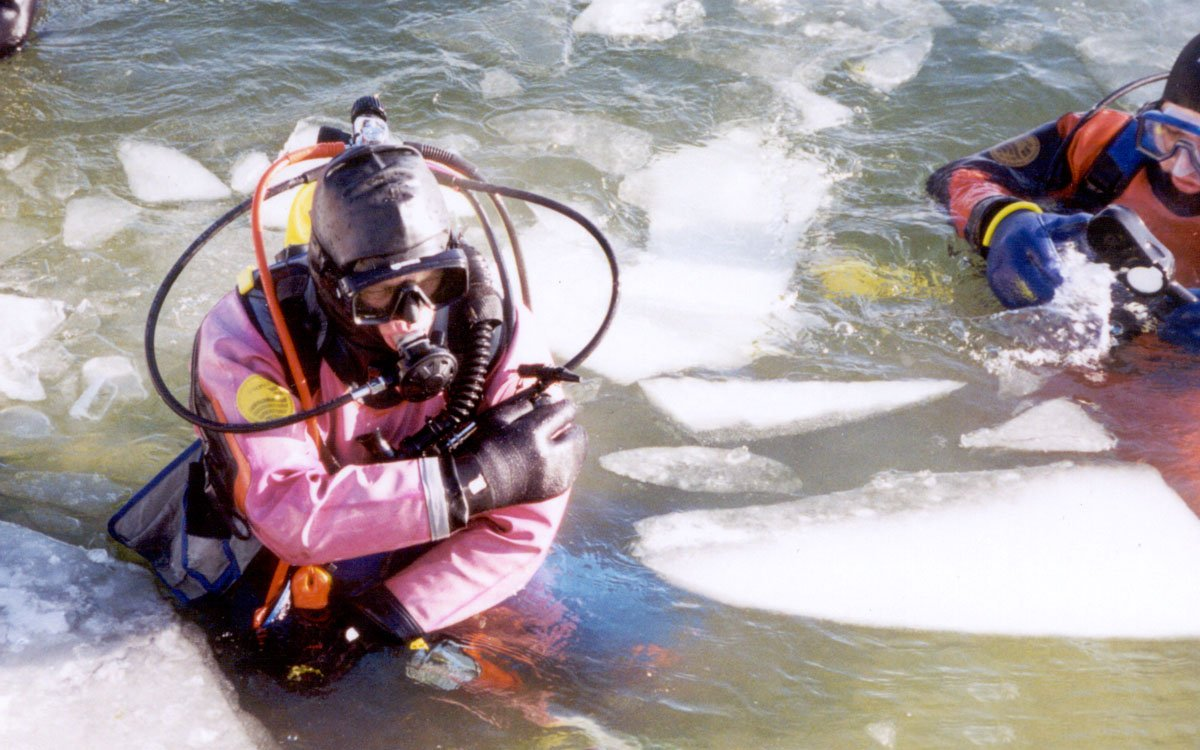
Dry suits

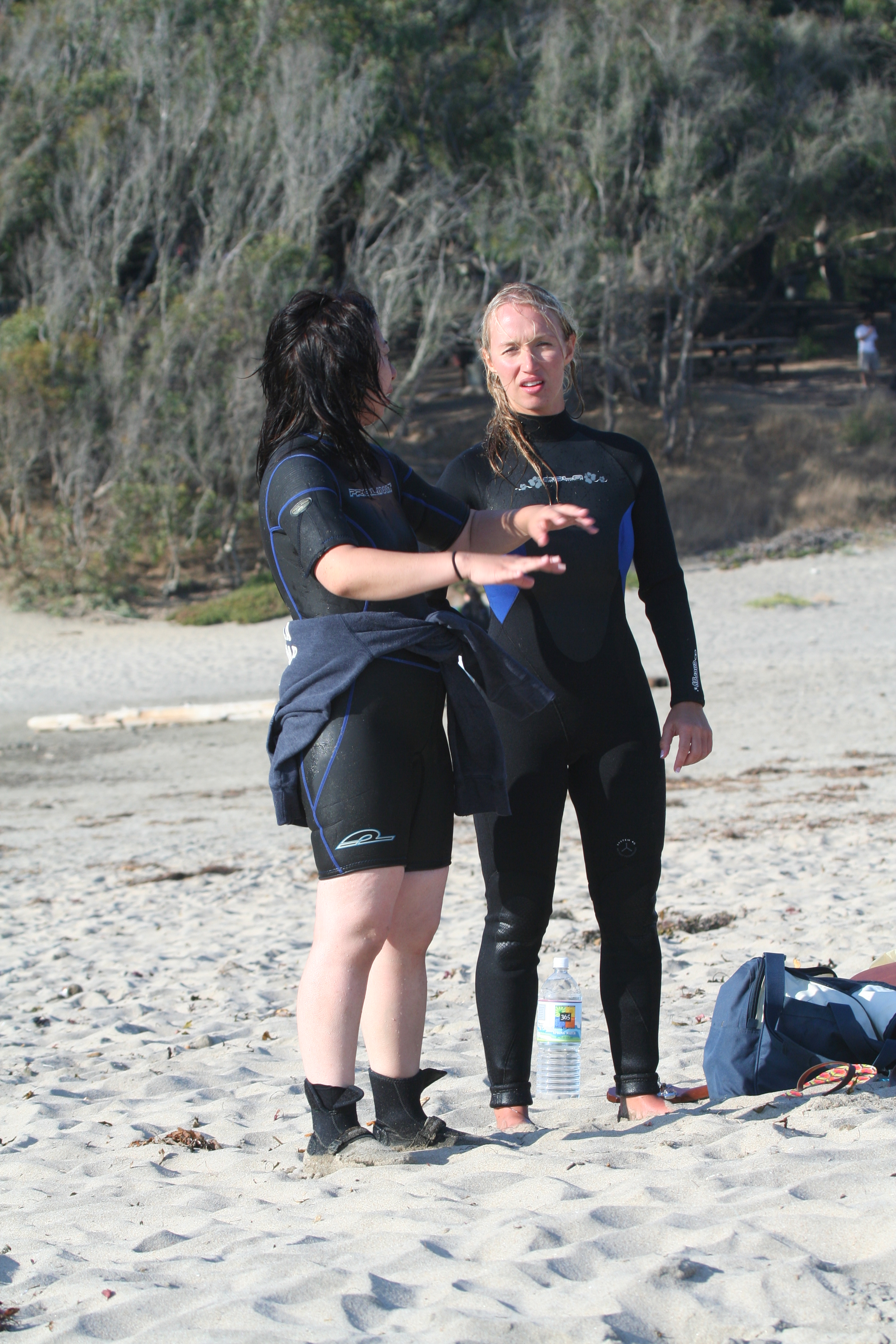
Short and full length wet suits

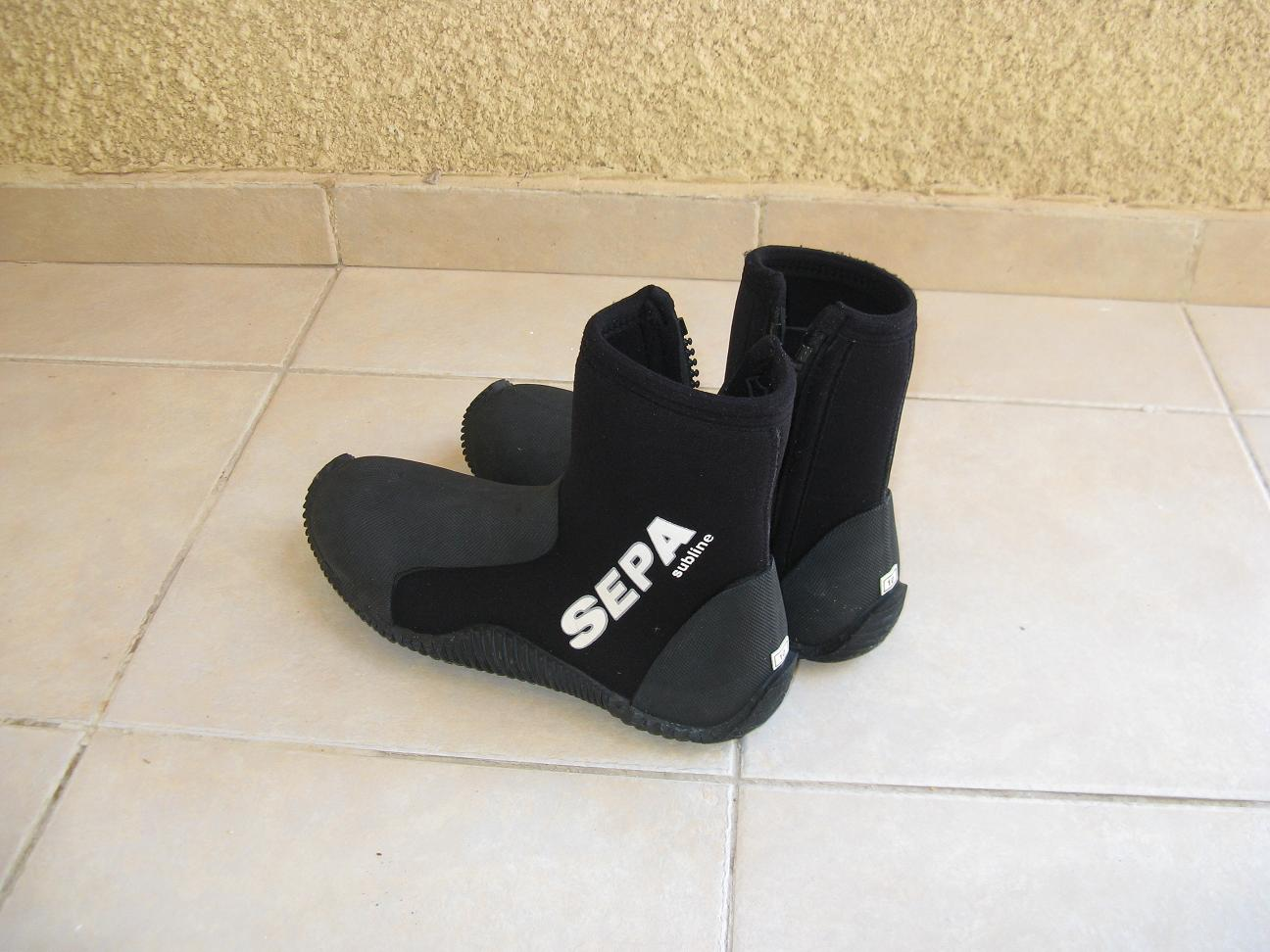
Wet suit boots

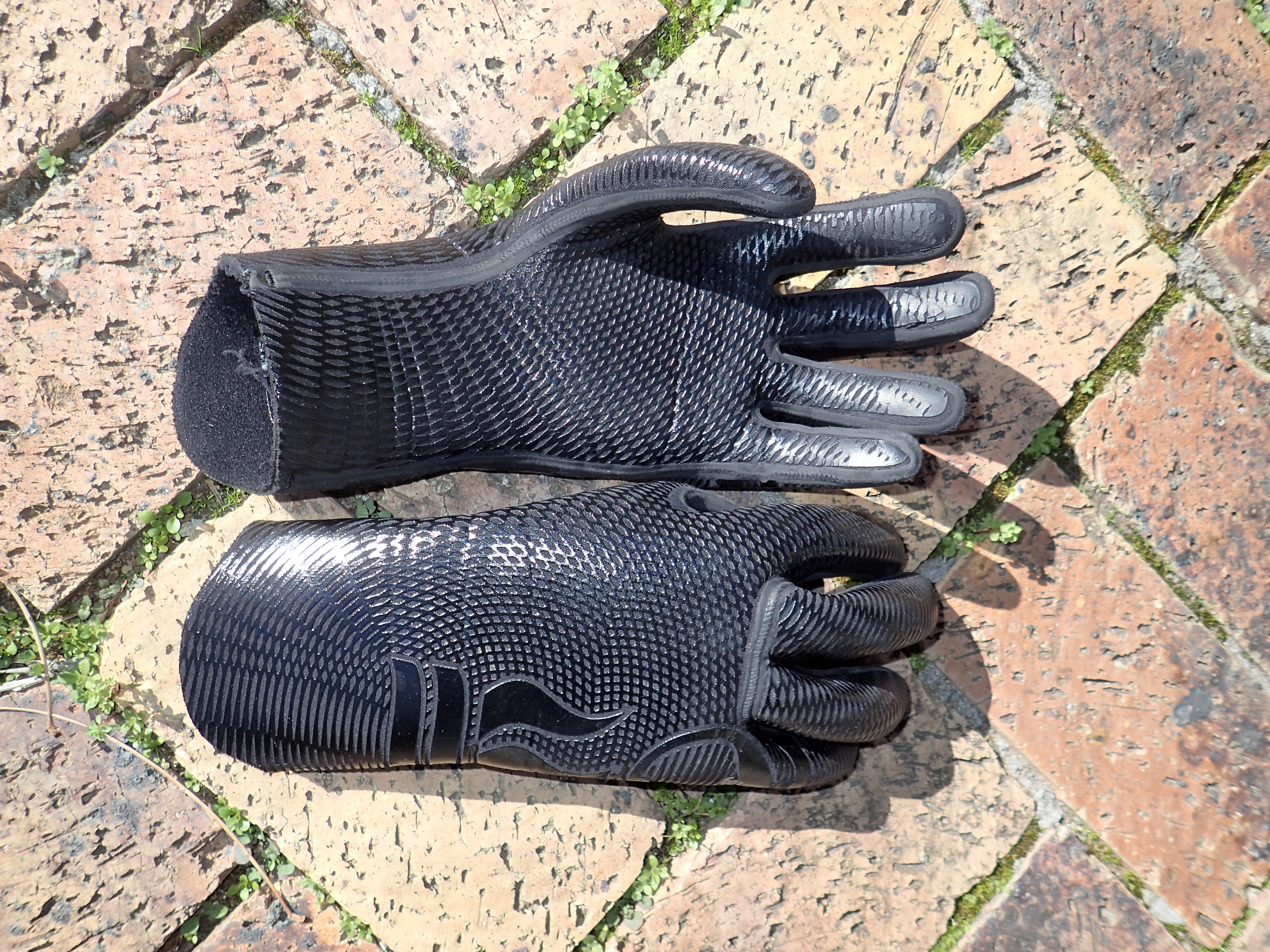
Neoprene diving gloves

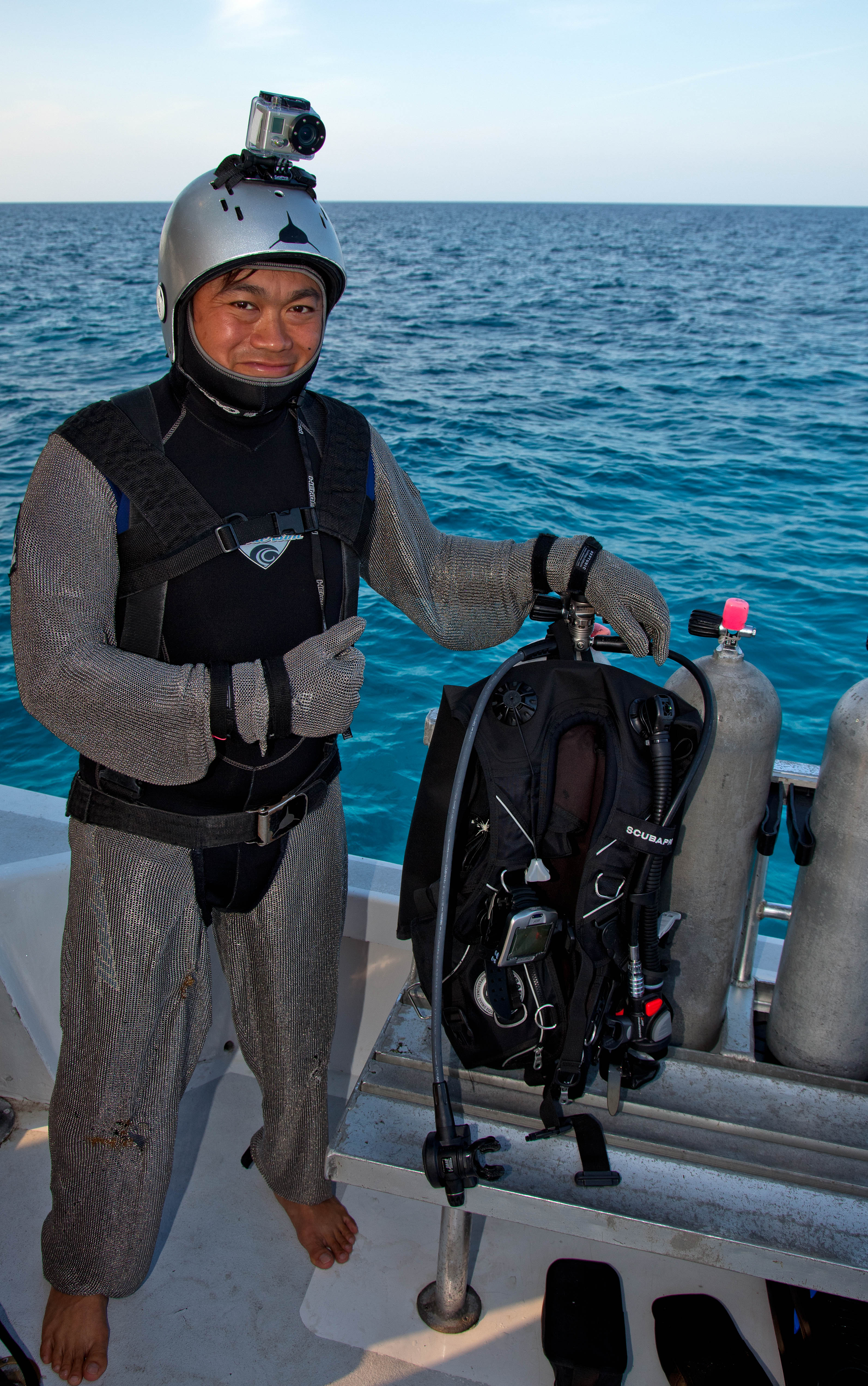
Chain mail shark suit

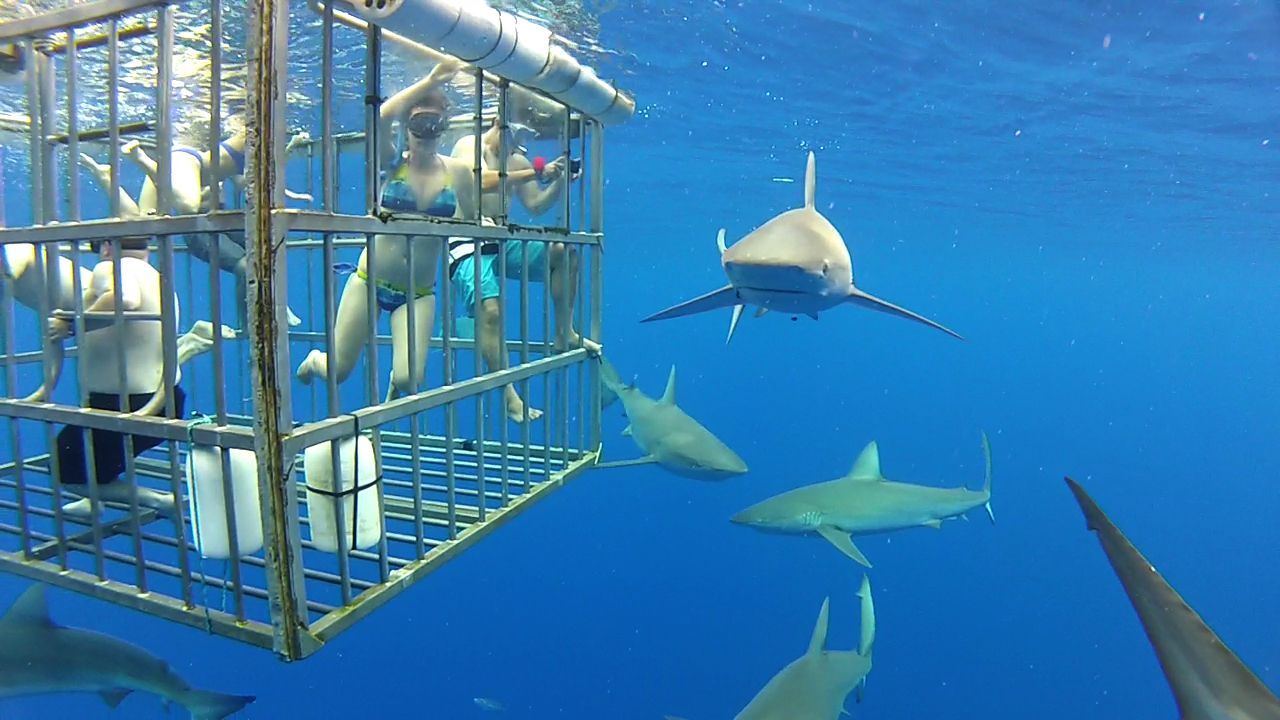
Shark proof cage

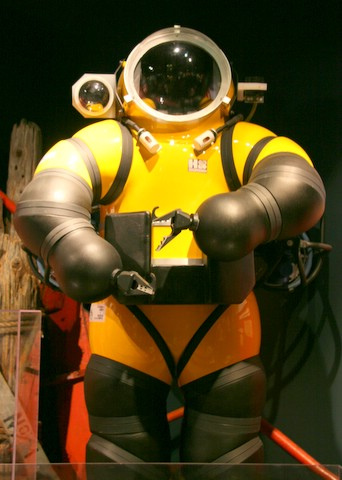
Atmospheric diving suit

=== In-water stabilisation and mobility ===
This equipment includes buoyancy control equipment and mobility equipment: Buoyancy control is achieved by ballasting with diving weights and compensating for buoyancy changes during the dive using a buoyancy compensator:

- Diving weighting system - to counteract the buoyancy of the diving suit and diver to allow descent. Professional divers may use additional weighting to ensure stability when working on the bottom
- Buoyancy compensator, also known as Buoyancy Control Device, BCD or BC - is usually a back mounted or sleeveless jacket style device which includes an inflatable bladder used to adjust the buoyancy of the diver under water, and provide positive buoyancy at the surface. The buoyancy compensator is usually an integral part of the harness system used to secure the scuba set to the diver. The earlier collar style buoyancy compensator is seldom used any more.

Mobility equipment allows the diver to move through the water and maneuver on the spot:

- Fins for efficient propulsion
- Diver Propulsion Vehicle - to increase the range of the diver underwater
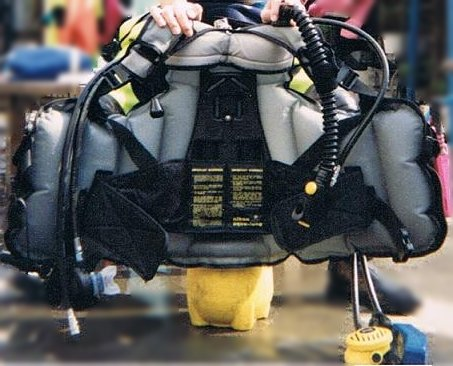
Jacket buoyancy compensator

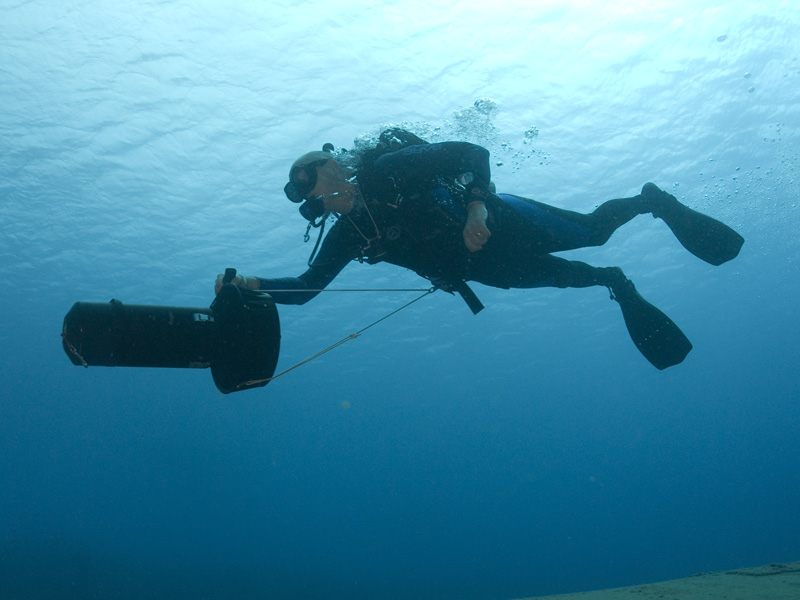
Diver propulsion vehicle (scooter)

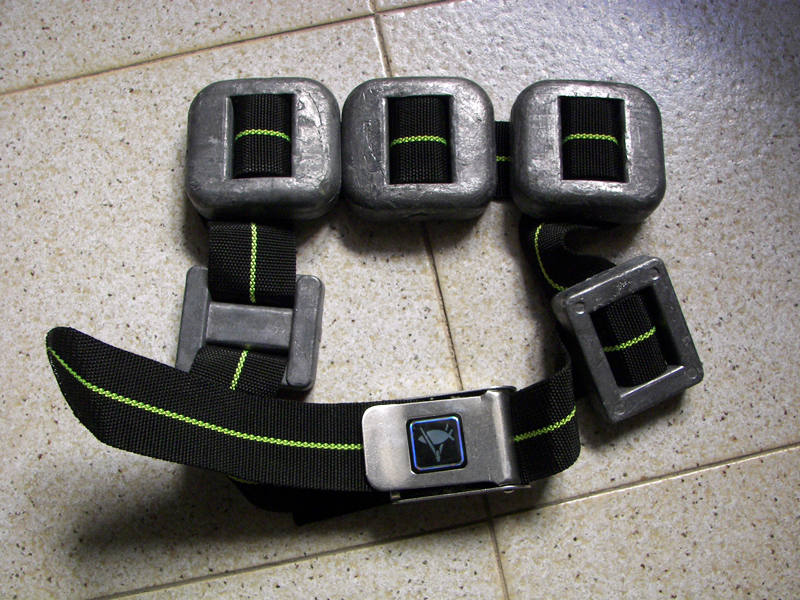
Weight belt

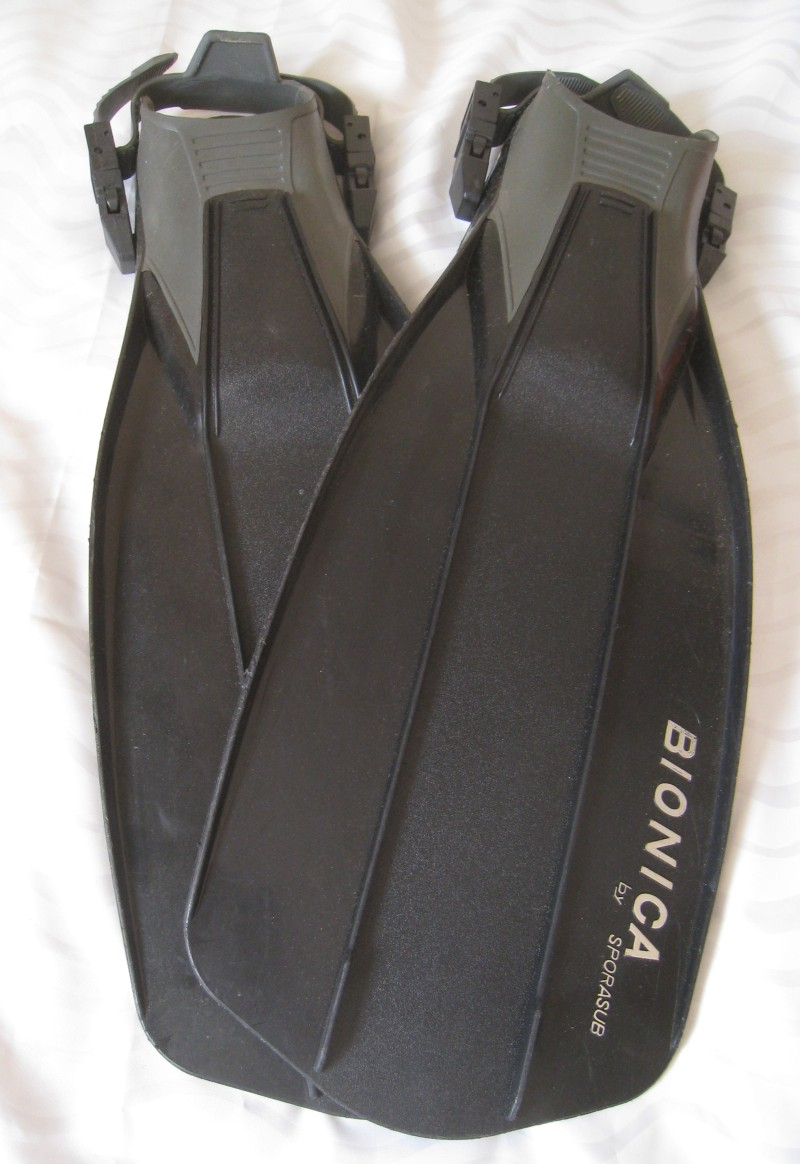
Swim fins

=== Equipment for dive monitoring and navigation ===
These are the equipment used for monitoring the course of the dive and following the dive plan when undesirable events are avoided. They include planning and monitoring the dive profile, gas usage and decompression, navigation, and modifying the plan to suit actual circumstances.

- Depth gauge lets the diver monitor depth, particularly maximum depth and, when used with a watch and Decompression tables, also allows the diver to monitor decompression requirements. Some digital depth gauges also indicate ascent rate which is an important factor in avoiding decompression sickness
- Pneumofathometer is the surface supplied diving depth gauge which displays the depth of the diver at the surface control panel. It uses hydrostatic back-pressure on a low flow rate open ended air hose to the diver to indicate depth.
- Diving watch is used with depth gauge for decompression monitoring when using decompression tables. Largely superseded by dive computers, where elapsed time is one of the standard displays, and time of day may also be available.
- Dive timer is an instrument that displays and records depth and elapsed time during the dive. It is usually possible to extract the information after the dive. This function is often available as "Gauge setting" on dive computers.
- Diving compass for underwater navigation. This may be a regular magnetic compass, but is often a selectable function of a dive computer, where a miniature magnetometer is used.
- Submersible pressure gauge, also known as a "contents gauge", is used to monitor the remaining breathing gas supply in scuba cylinders.
- Dive computer helps the diver to avoid decompression sickness by indicating the decompression stops needed for the dive profile. Most dive computers also indicate depth, time and ascent rate. Some also indicate oxygen toxicity exposure and water temperature, and may provide other functions. A display of cylinder pressure is available on air-integrated computers, either via a direct high pressure hose, or remotely via a pressure transducer and through-water transmission.
- Distance line, guide line, or "come-home-line" can be used to guide the diver back to the start point and safety in poor visibility.
  - A cave line is a line laid by a diver while penetrating a cave to ensure that the way out is known. Permanent cave lines are marked with line markers at all junctions, indicating the direction along the line toward the nearest exit.
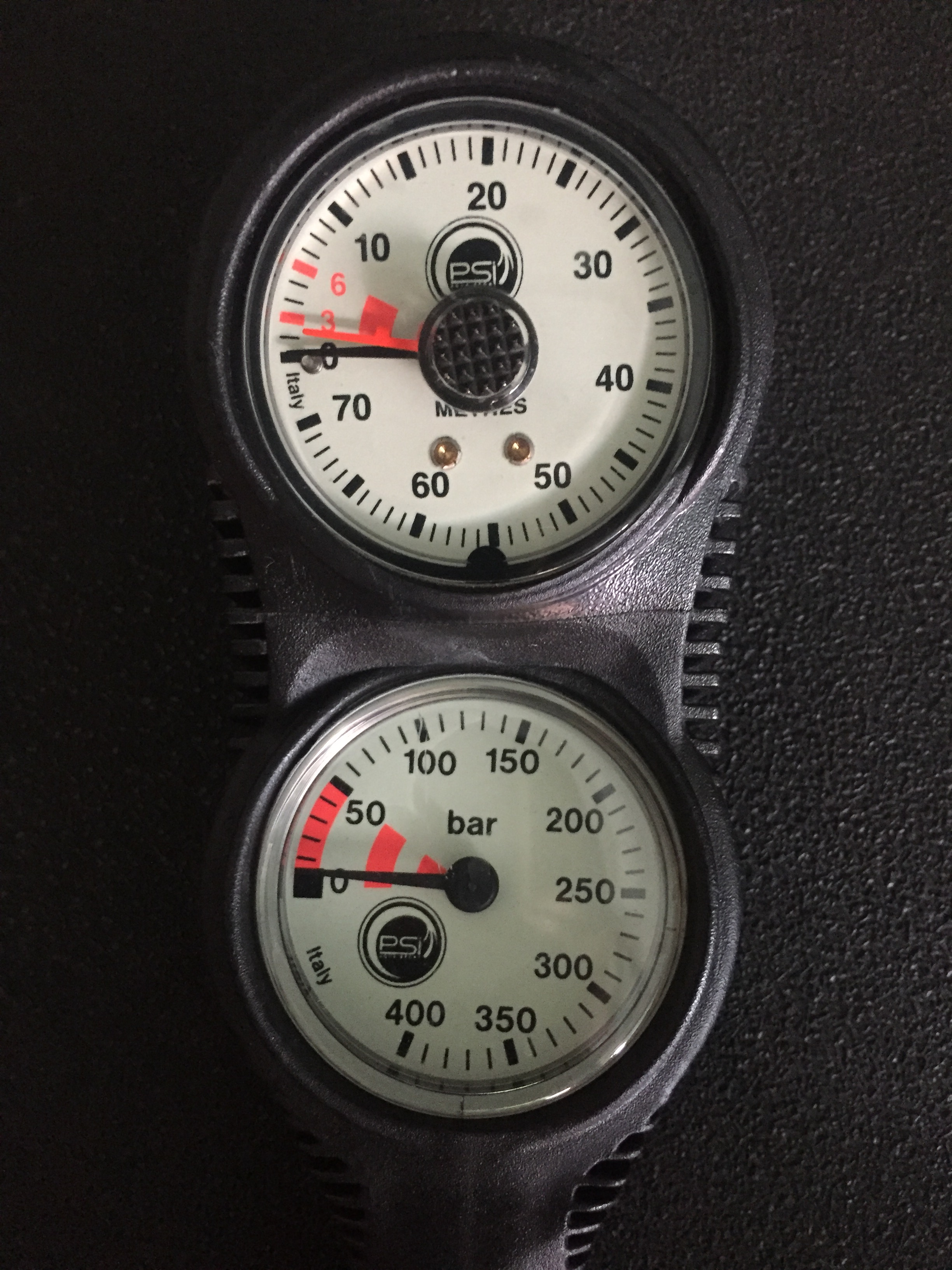
A depth gauge and submersible pressure gauge

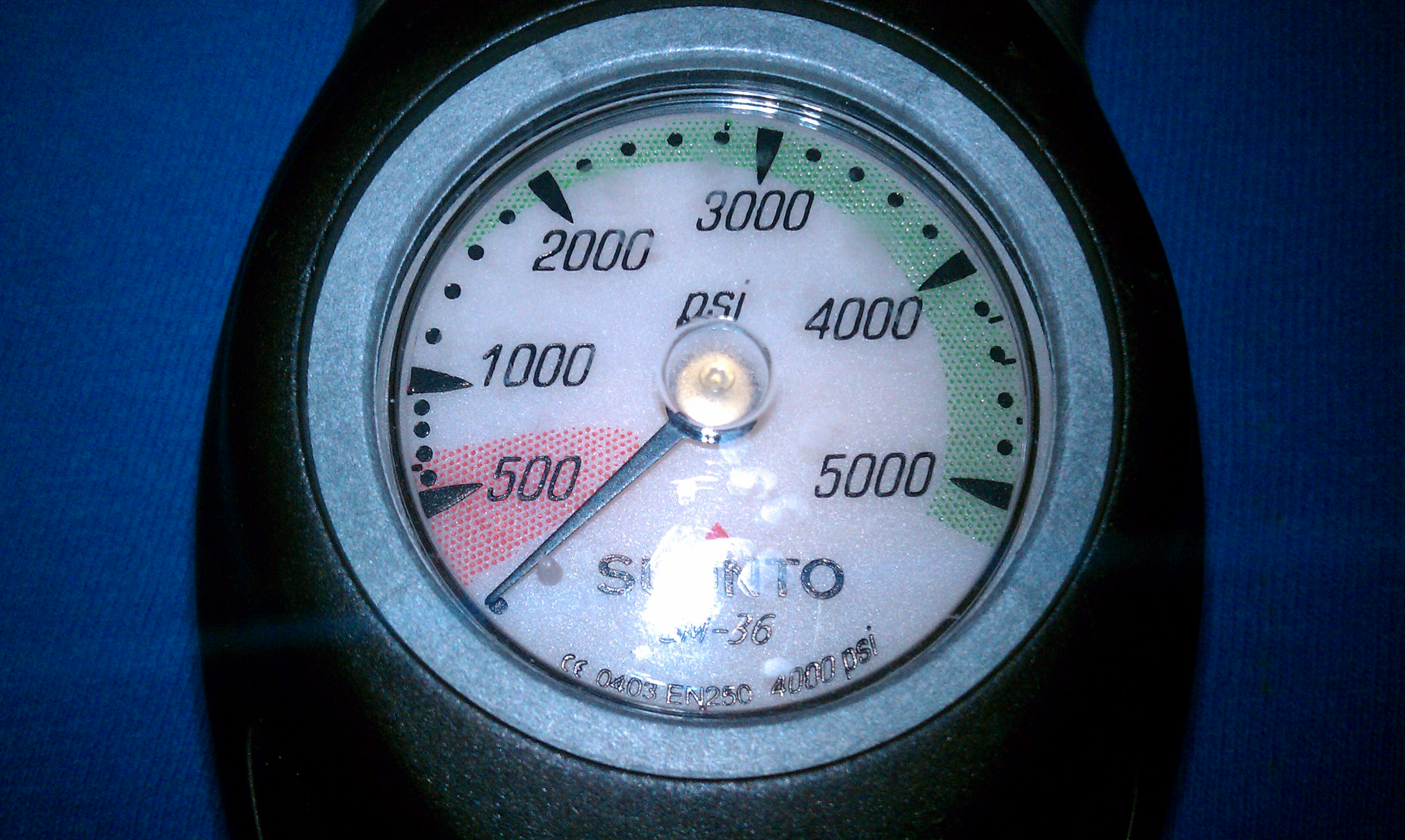
Submersible pressure gauge

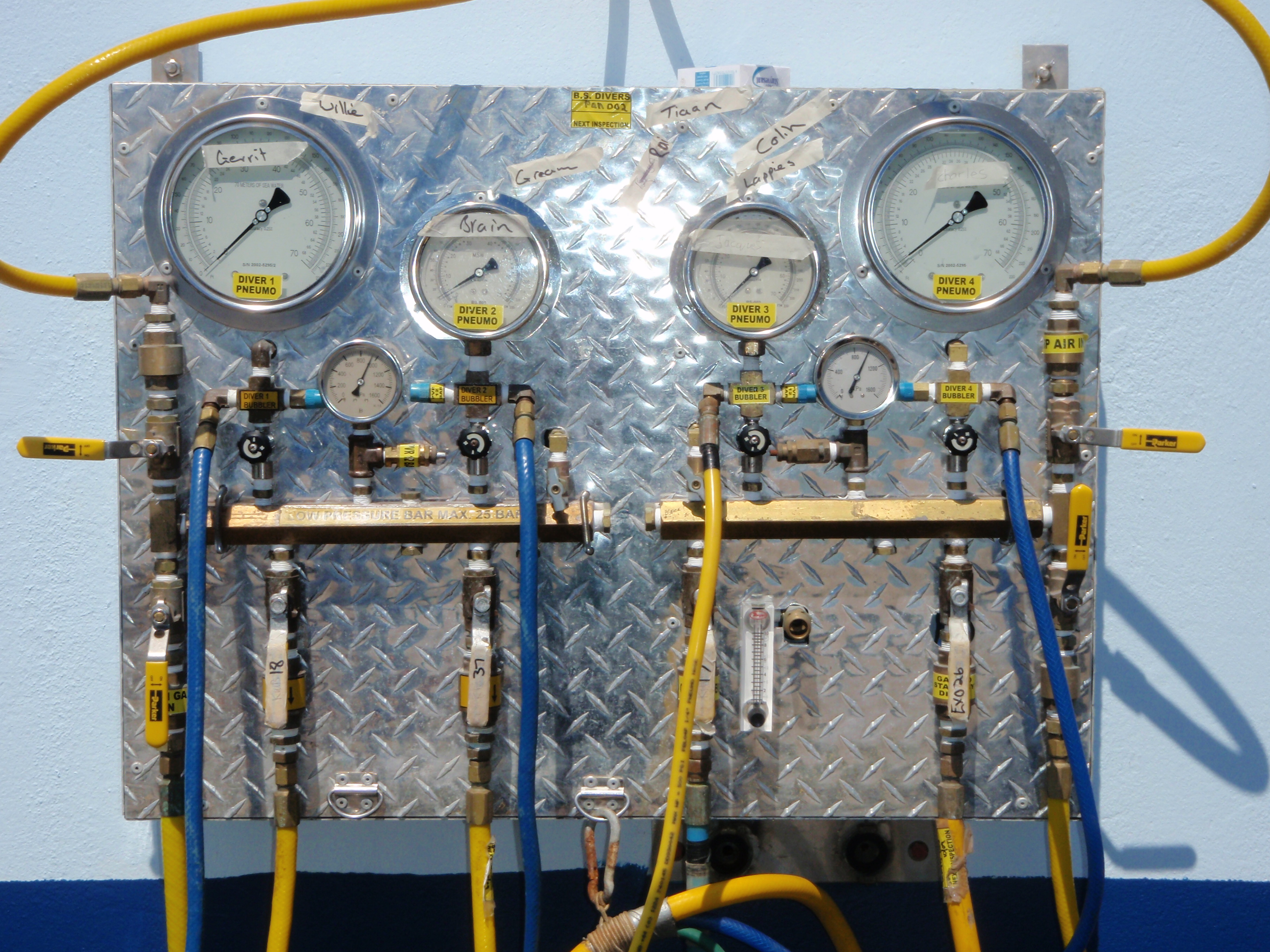
A surface supply panel for four divers showing four pneumofathometer gauges

A watch sized dive computer incorporating an electronic compass and the ability to display cylinder pressure when used with an optional transmitter

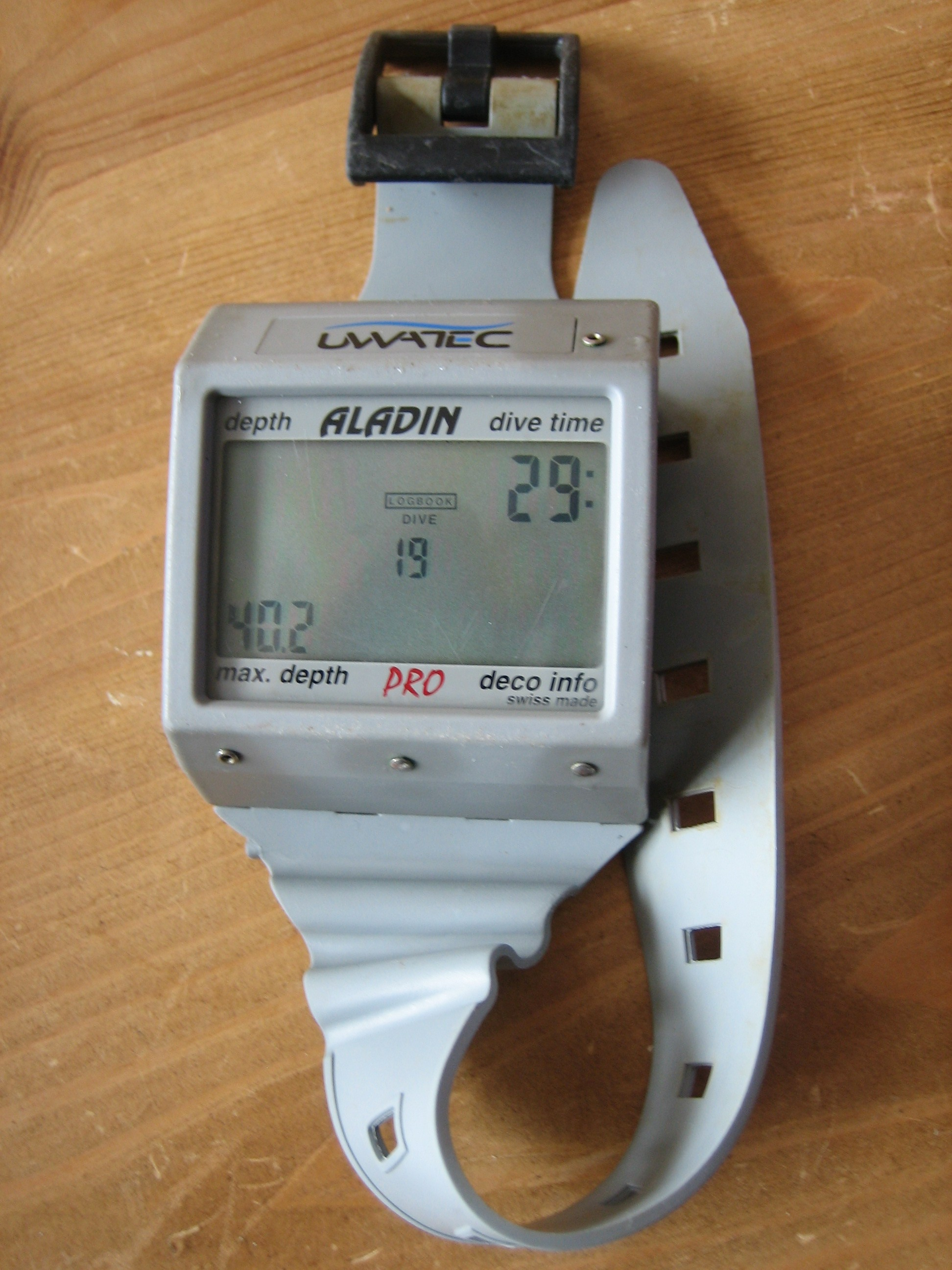
Dive computer showing the log of a previous dive

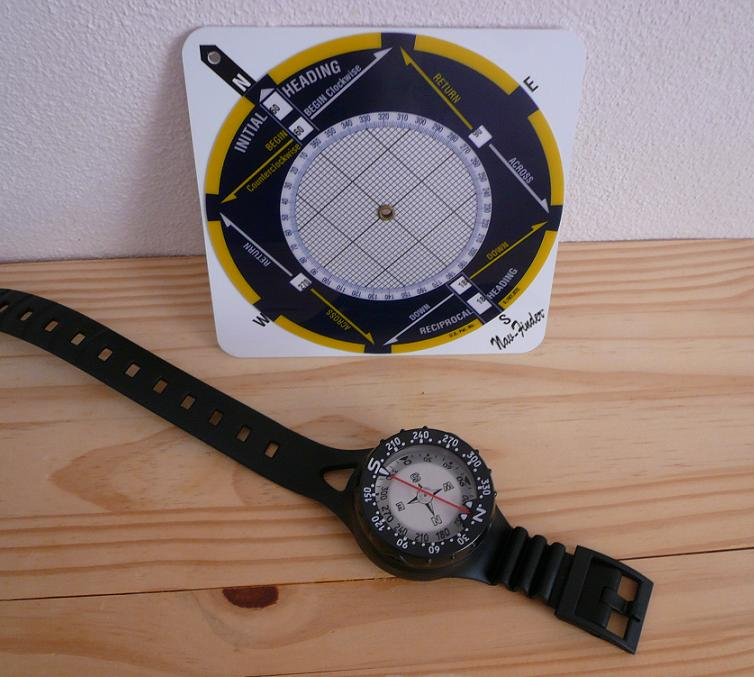
Nav finder and underwater compass - basic underwater navigation tools.

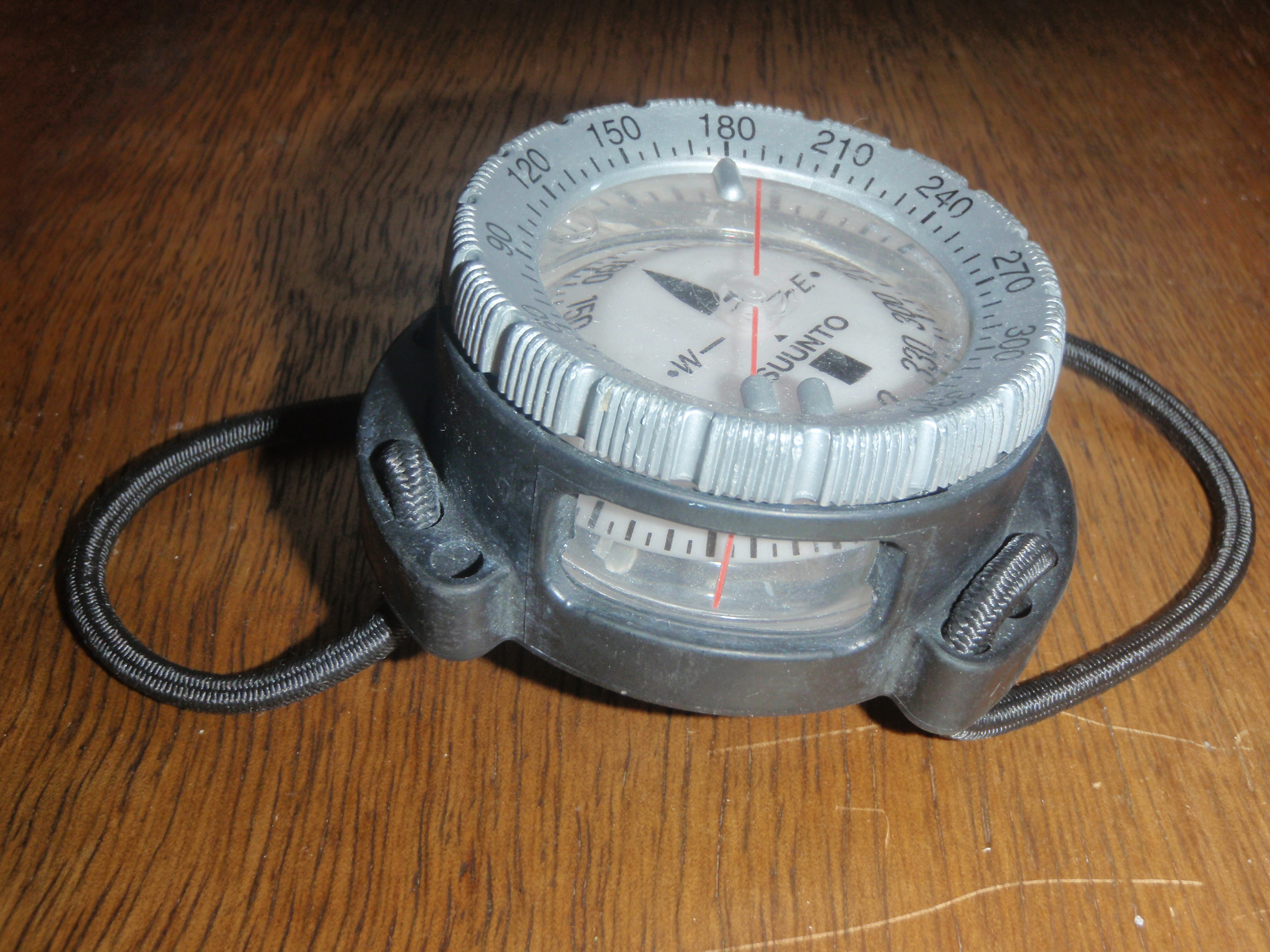
Diving compass in aftermarket wrist mount with bungee straps

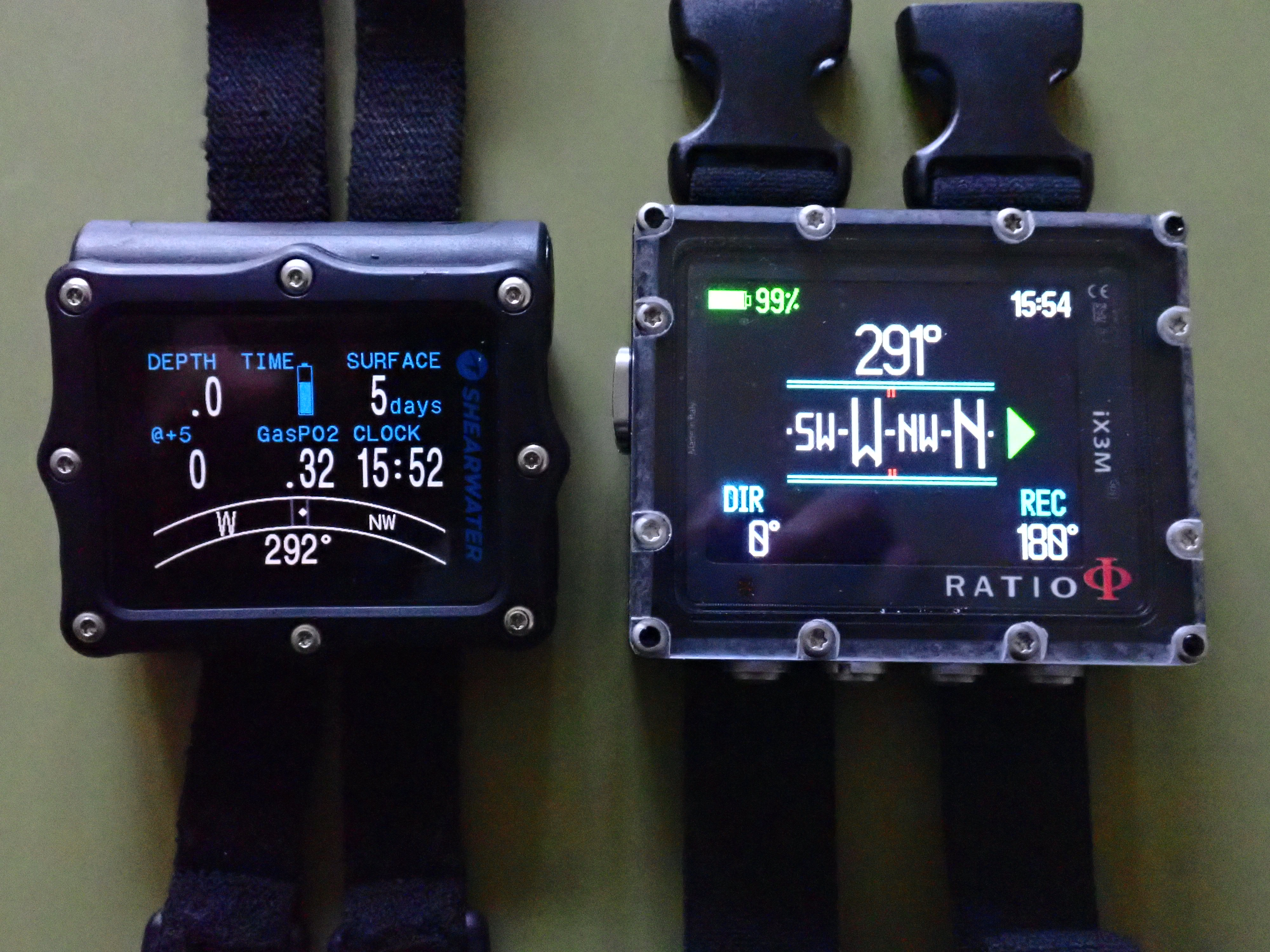
Dive computers in compass mode

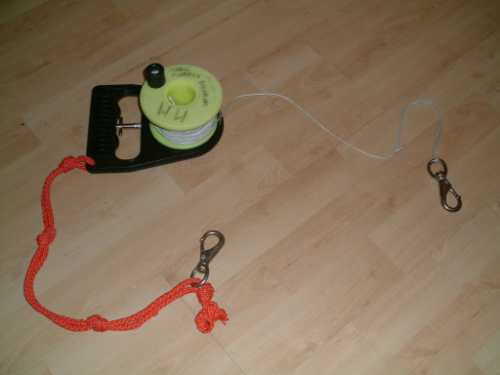
50 metres of line on a reel

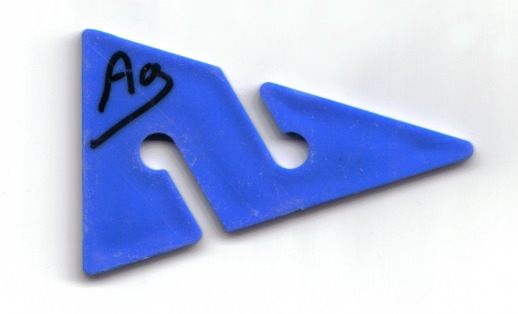
Line arrow marker

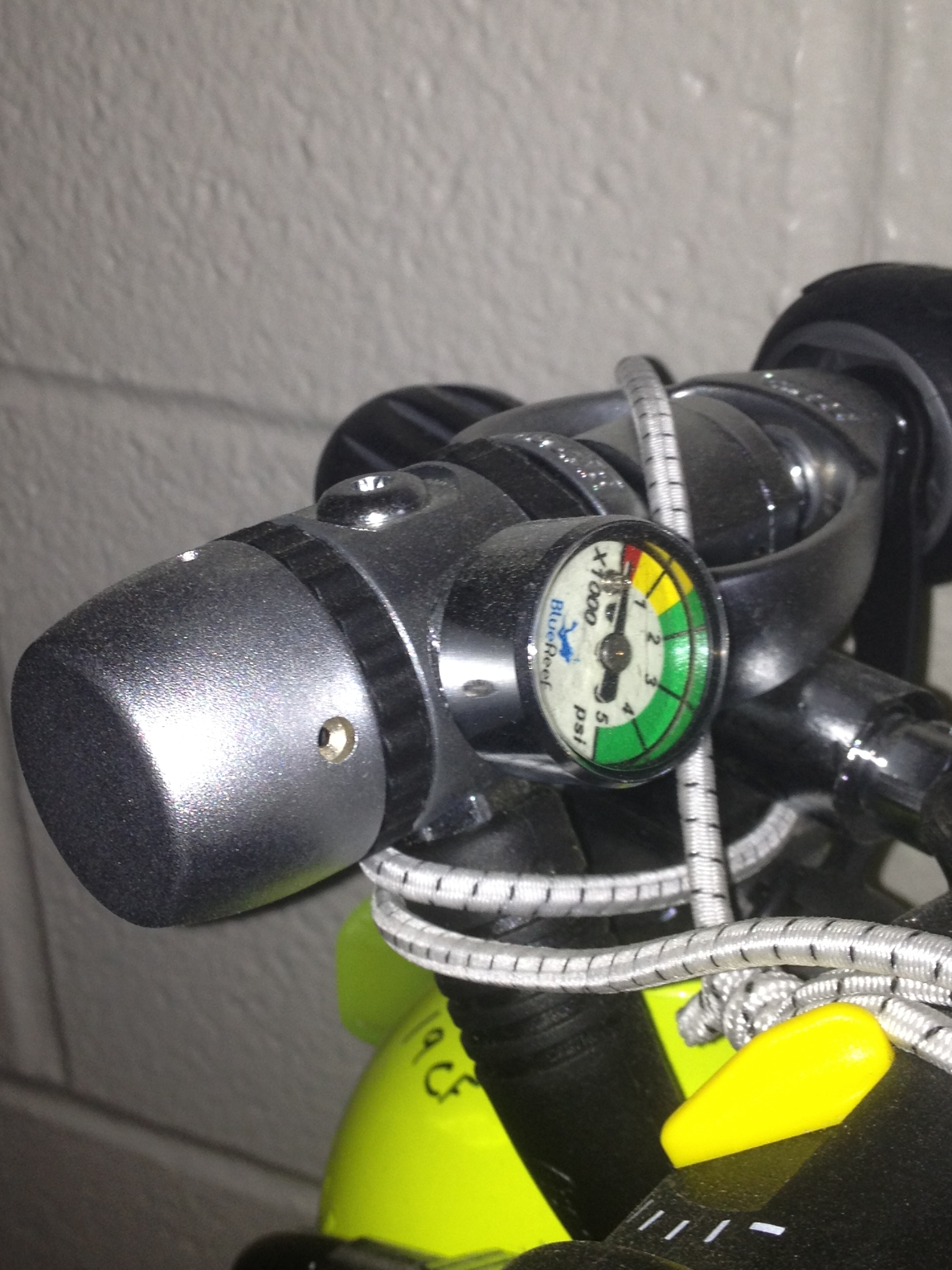
A miniature submersible pressure gauge (mini SPG) used on pony cylinders

=== Vision and communication ===
Underwater vision is significantly affected by several factors. Objects are less visible because of lower levels of natural illumination and are blurred by scattering of light between the object and the viewer, also resulting in lower contrast. These effects vary with wavelength of the light, and color and turbidity of the water. The human eye is unable to focus when in direct contact with water, and an air space must be provided. Voice communication requires special equipment, and much recreational diver communication is visual and based on hand signals.

- Masks allow the diver to see clearly underwater and protect the eyes.
  - Full face masks protect the face from dirty or cold water and reduce risk by securing the gas supply to the diver's face. If it contains no mouthpiece, the diver can talk, allowing the use of communications equipment.
  - Half masks cover only the eyes and nose. The diver breathes from a separate mouthpiece on the regulator or rebreather.
    - A prescription mask, or glasses which can be mounted inside the mask or helmet to provide clear vision underwater, enhancing the experience and safety for those with vision problems. A prescription mask contains lenses mounted in the scuba mask frame or bonded to the original viewports.
- Diving helmets are often used for surface-supplied diving. They provide the same benefits as the full face mask but provide a very secure connection of the gas supply to the diver and additionally protect the head.
- Underwater writing slates and pencils are used to transport pre-dive plans underwater, to record facts while underwater and to aid communication with other divers.
- Dive lights, which are usually waterproof and pressure rated torches or flashlights, are essential for safety in low visibility or dark environments such as night diving and wreck and cave penetration. They are useful for communication and signalling both underwater and on the surface at night. Divers need artificial light even in shallow and clear water to reveal the red end of the spectrum of light which is absorbed as it travels through water. Underwater video lights can serve the same purpose.
- Hand-held sonar for a diver can provide a synthetic view using ultrasonic signals emitted and processed by an electronic device and displayed on a screen.
- Ultrasonic signalling devices which attract the buddies attention by vibration have been marketed and may have some limited utility.
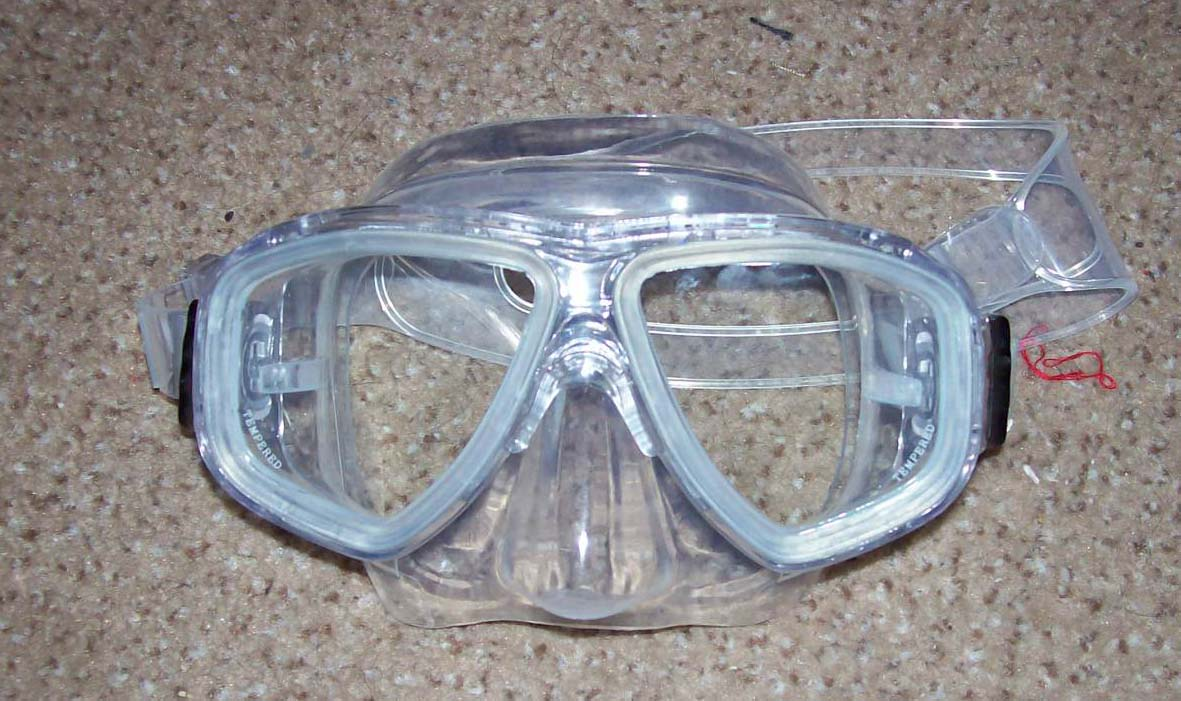
A diving half mask provides clear sight and protection for the eyes.

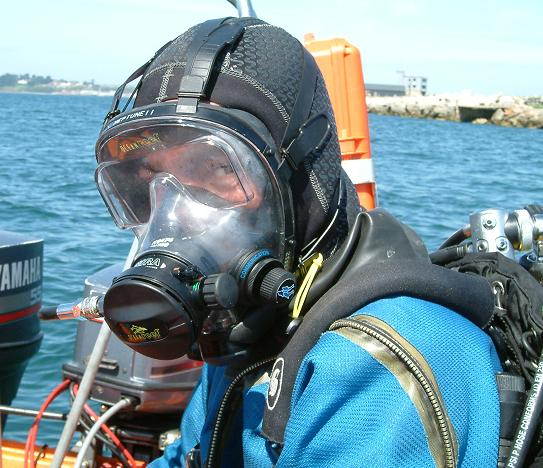
A full face mask covers the eyes, nose and mouth.

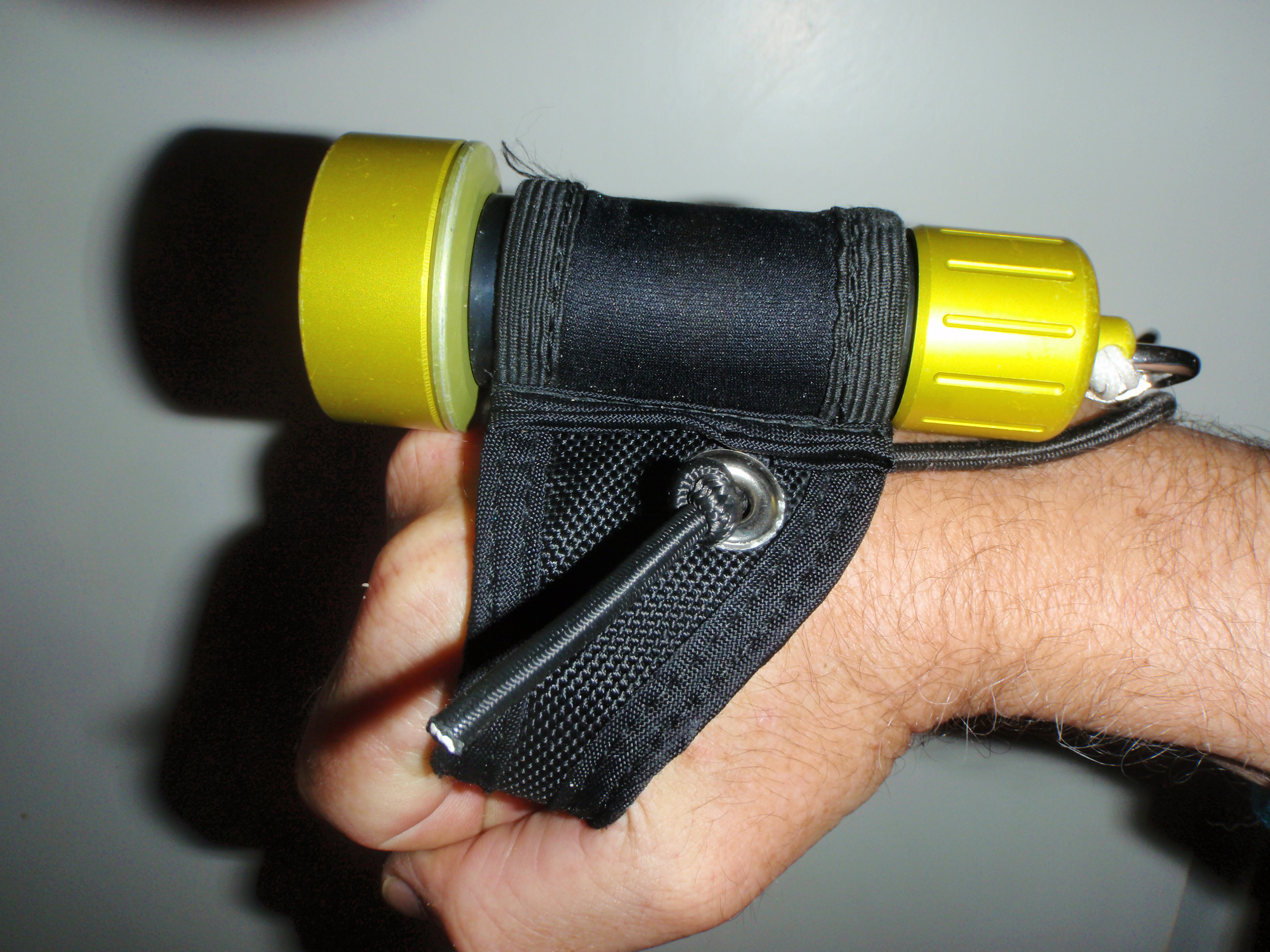
One piece LED dive light with soft Goodman type handle

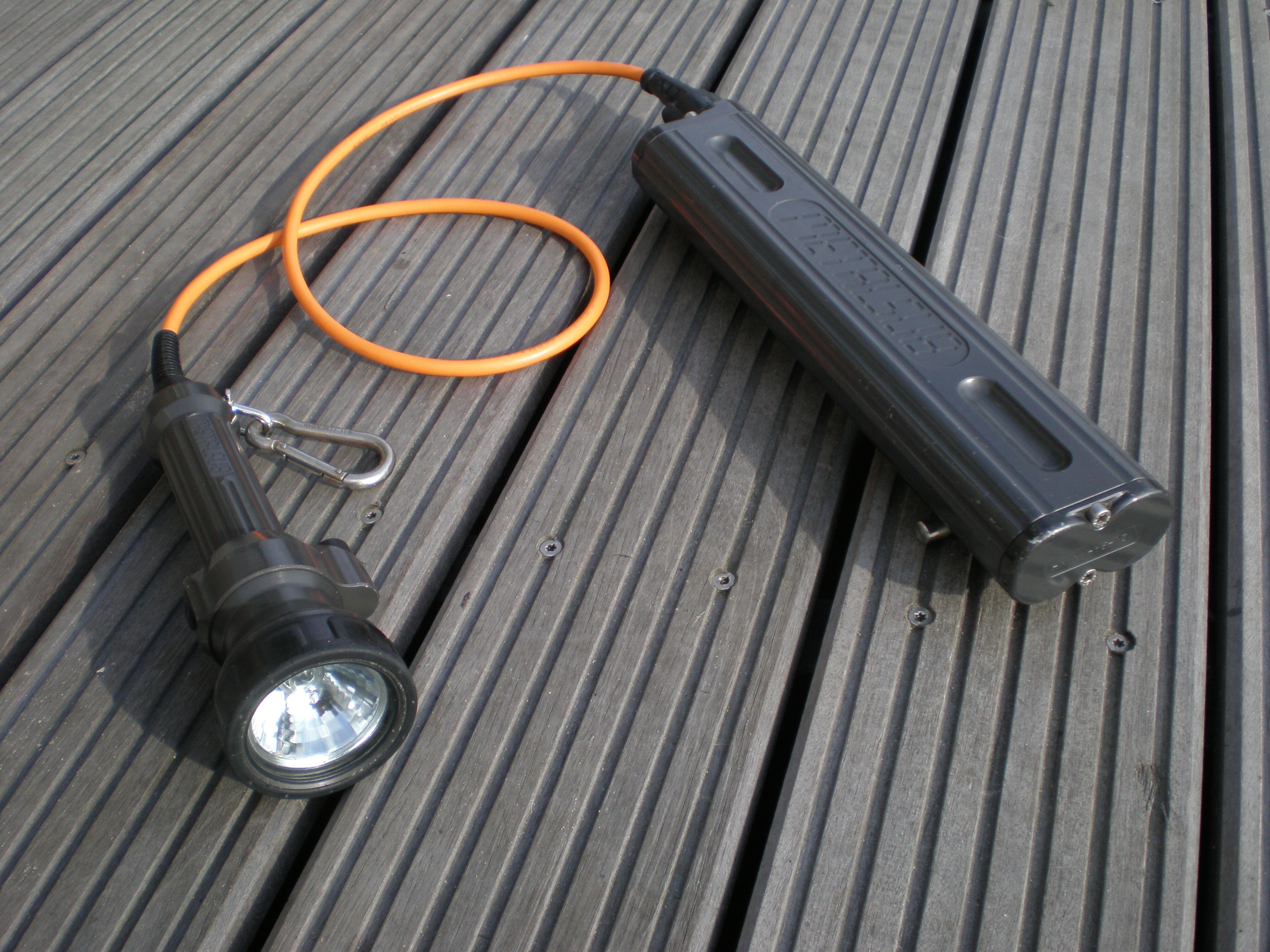
A "canister" style dive light

=== Safety equipment ===
Diving safety equipment in the broader sense would include all equipment that could make a dive safer, by reducing a hazard, reducing the probability of an adverse event, or mitigating its effects. This would include basic equipment such as primary breathing apparatus, exposure protection, buoyancy management equipment and mobility equipment. The more specific meaning is equipment primarily and explicitly used to improve safety of a dive or diving operation. Equipment intended to improve safety in the second sense includes:

- Diver's safety harness, to which a lifeline may be attached, including bell harness, AR vest, or jump jacket.
- Lifeline (or tether): A line from the diver to a tender at the surface control point, which may be used for:
  - communications, by diving line signals,
  - to allow the diver to be found by the stand-by diver following the line,
  - to provide a guideline to the surface control point to guide the diver on return,
  - to assist the diver to maintain position in a current,
  - in an emergency, to recover the diver to the surface, and
  - in some cases lift the diver out of the water.
- Shotline: A line connecting a shot weight to a marker buoy, used to mark a dive site and provide a vertical reference for descent and ascent.
- Buddy line: A short line or strap connecting two divers in the water, used to prevent them from being separated in poor visibility and for communication by line signals.
- Jonline: A short line or webbing strap to tether the diver to the shotline in a current.
- Alternative ascent system: Defined in Queensland law as "A highly visible buoyancy device such as a delayed surface marker buoy that provides a submerged diver with an ascent line that the diver may follow to the surface and use to complete any decompression requirements."
  - Surface marker buoy, which indicates the position of the divers to people at the surface. May be used as an alternative ascent system.
  - DSMB - (Delayed, or deployable surface marker buoy), or decompression buoy which is inflated at the start of, or during the ascent, to indicate the position of the divers to the surface team, and as a signal that the divers are ascending. A definitive type of alternative ascent system.
- Cutting tool
  - Knife to cut lines, nets or to pry or dig. Not intended for personal protection against underwater predators as it is generally ineffective for this purpose.
  - Diver's net or line cutter. This is a small handheld tool carried by scuba divers to extricate themselves if trapped in fishing net or fishing line. It has a small sharp blade such as a replaceable scalpel blade inside the small notch. There is usually a hole at the other end of the handle for a lanyard to tether the cutter to the diver.
  - Trauma shears. Very effective as a line cutter, with low risk of inadvertent injury or damage. Usually carried in a pocket or special purpose sheath.
- Automatic diver recovery devices which inflate the BCD if the diver stops breathing have been marketed. They are not generally used and the risks may outweigh possible benefits.
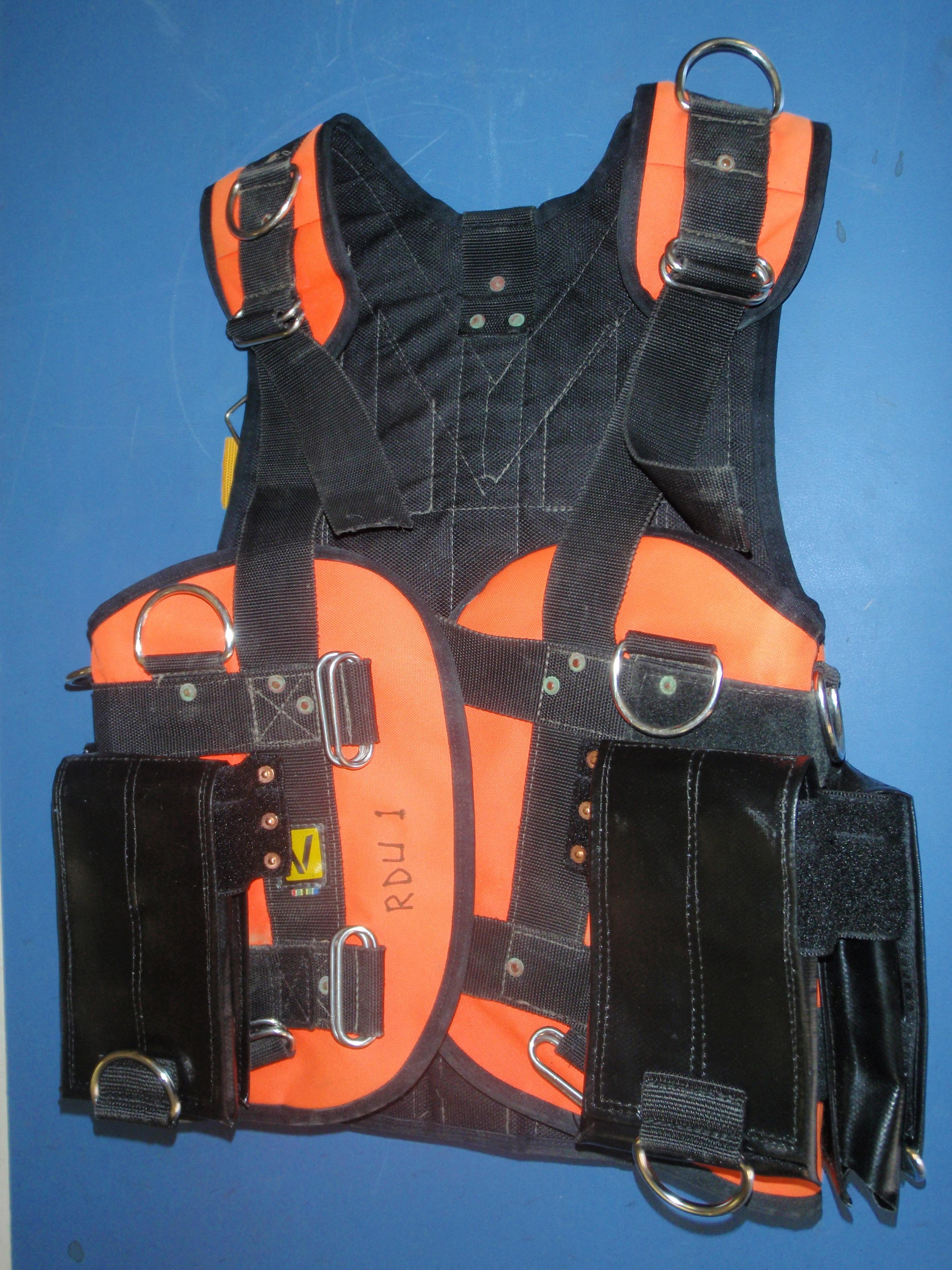
Front view of jacket style diver harness with removable weight pockets

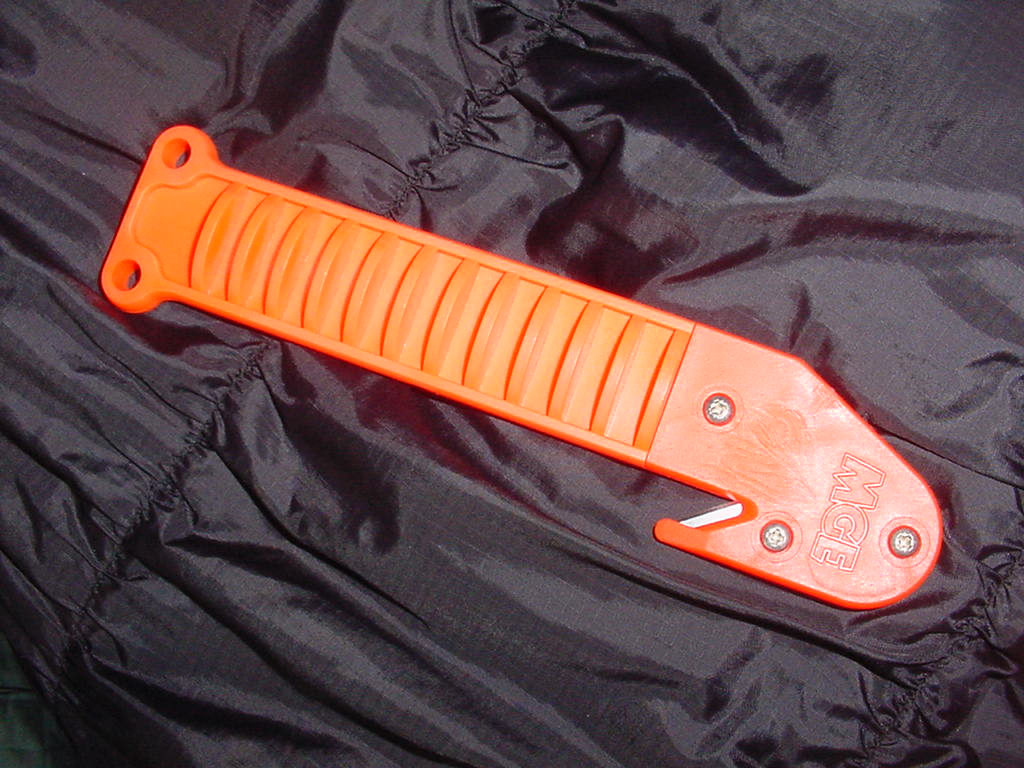
Scuba diver's net cutter. 7 inches long

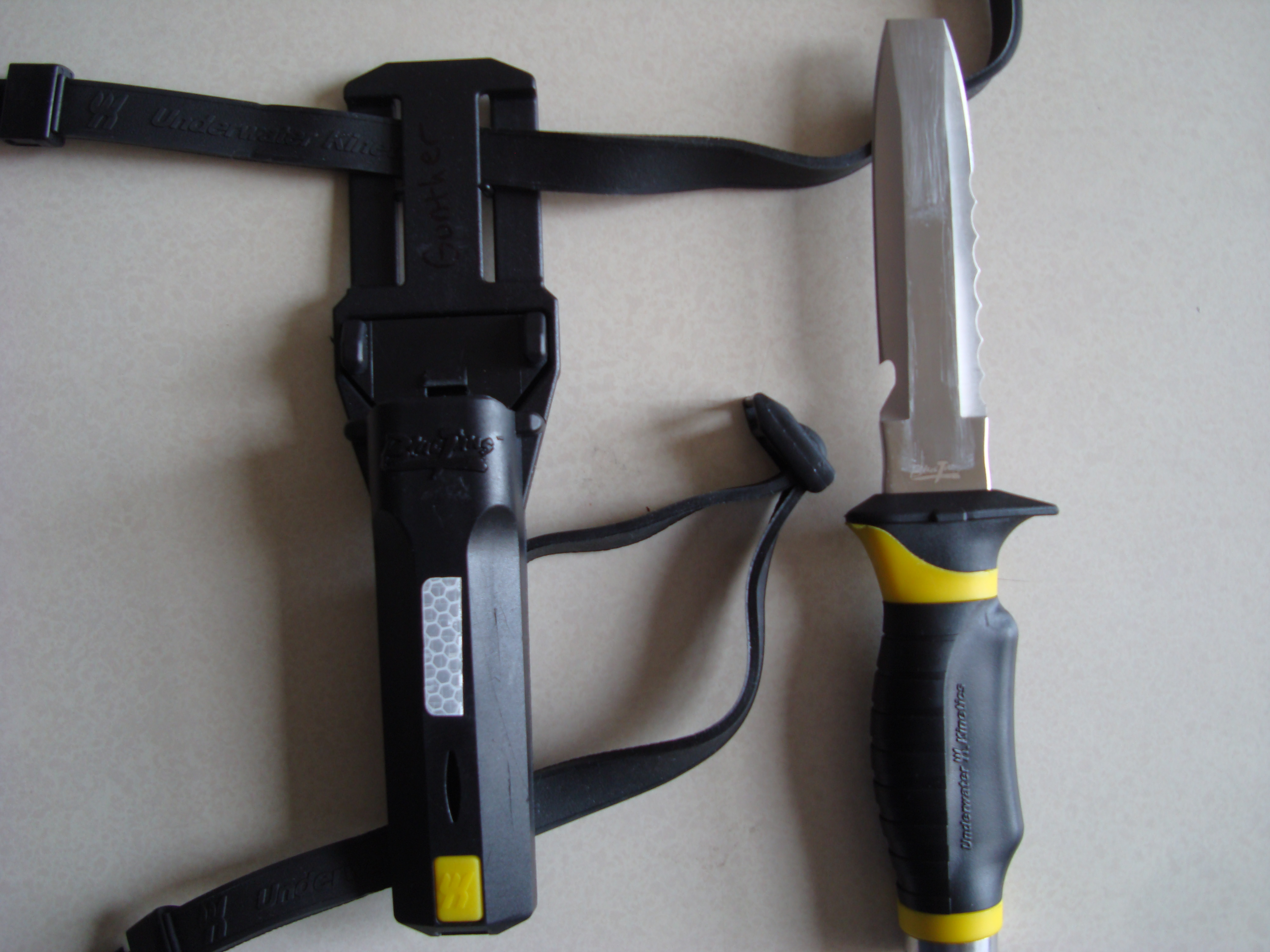
Underwater Kinetics general purpose dive knife

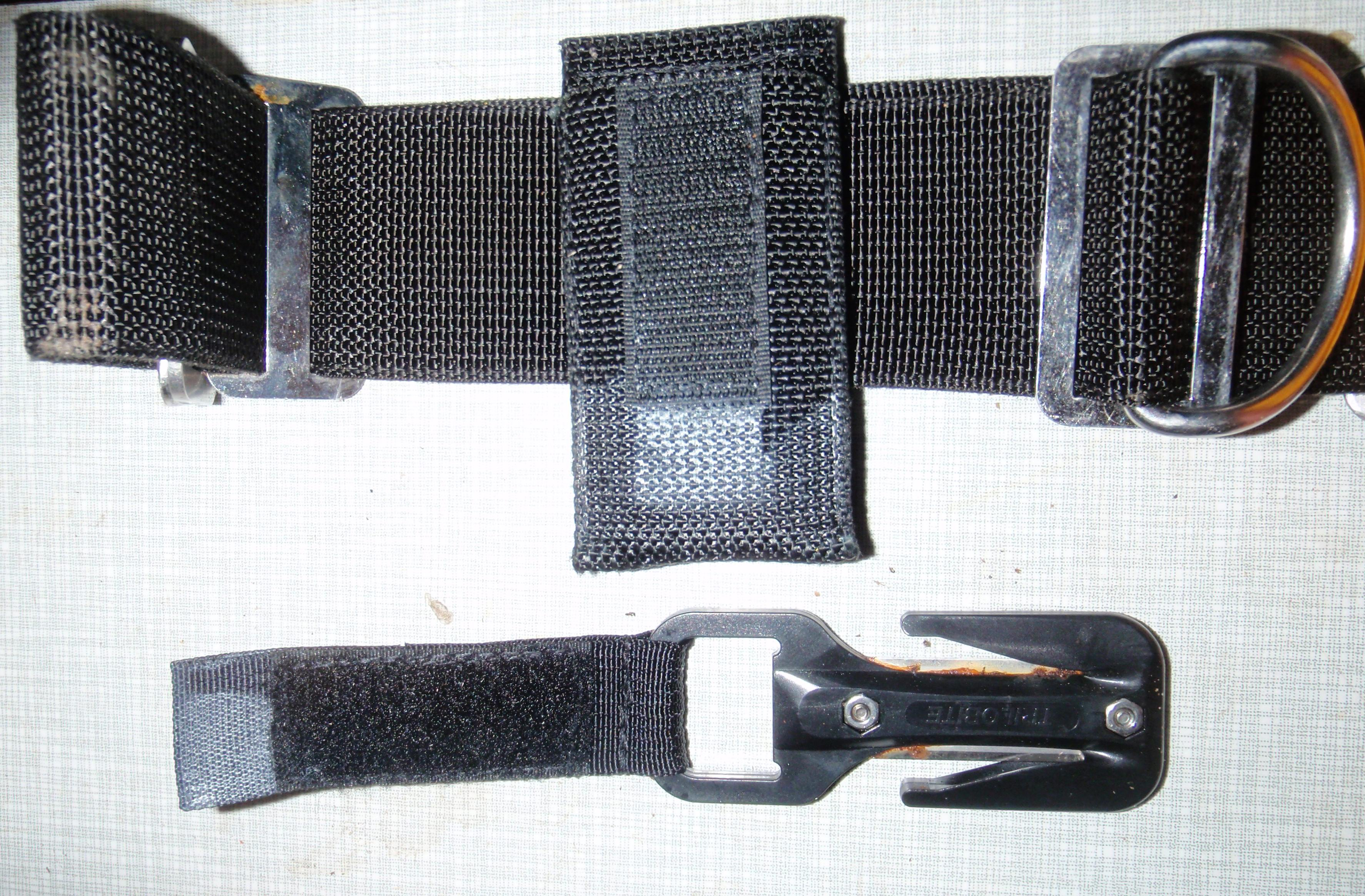
Trilobite line cutter with sheath on diving harness

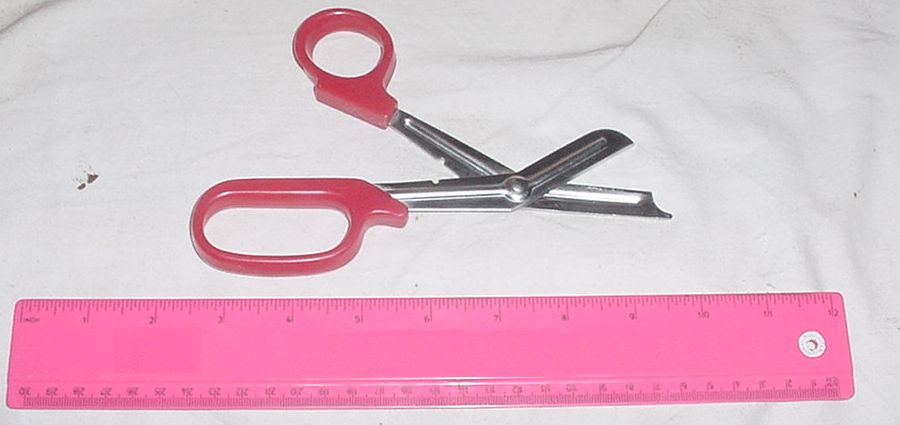
Trauma shears

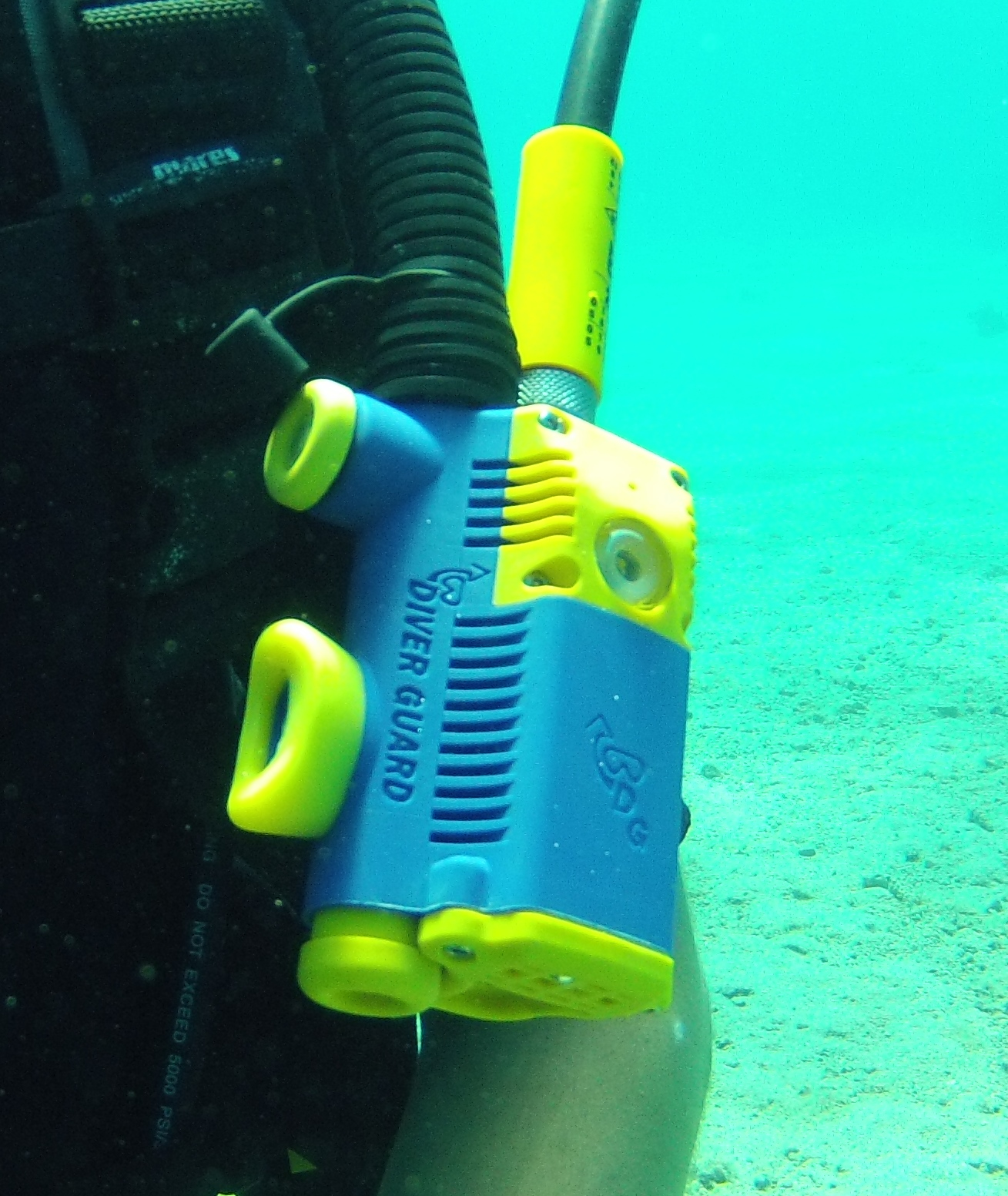
DiverGuard automatically inflates the buoyancy compensator if the diver stops breathing.

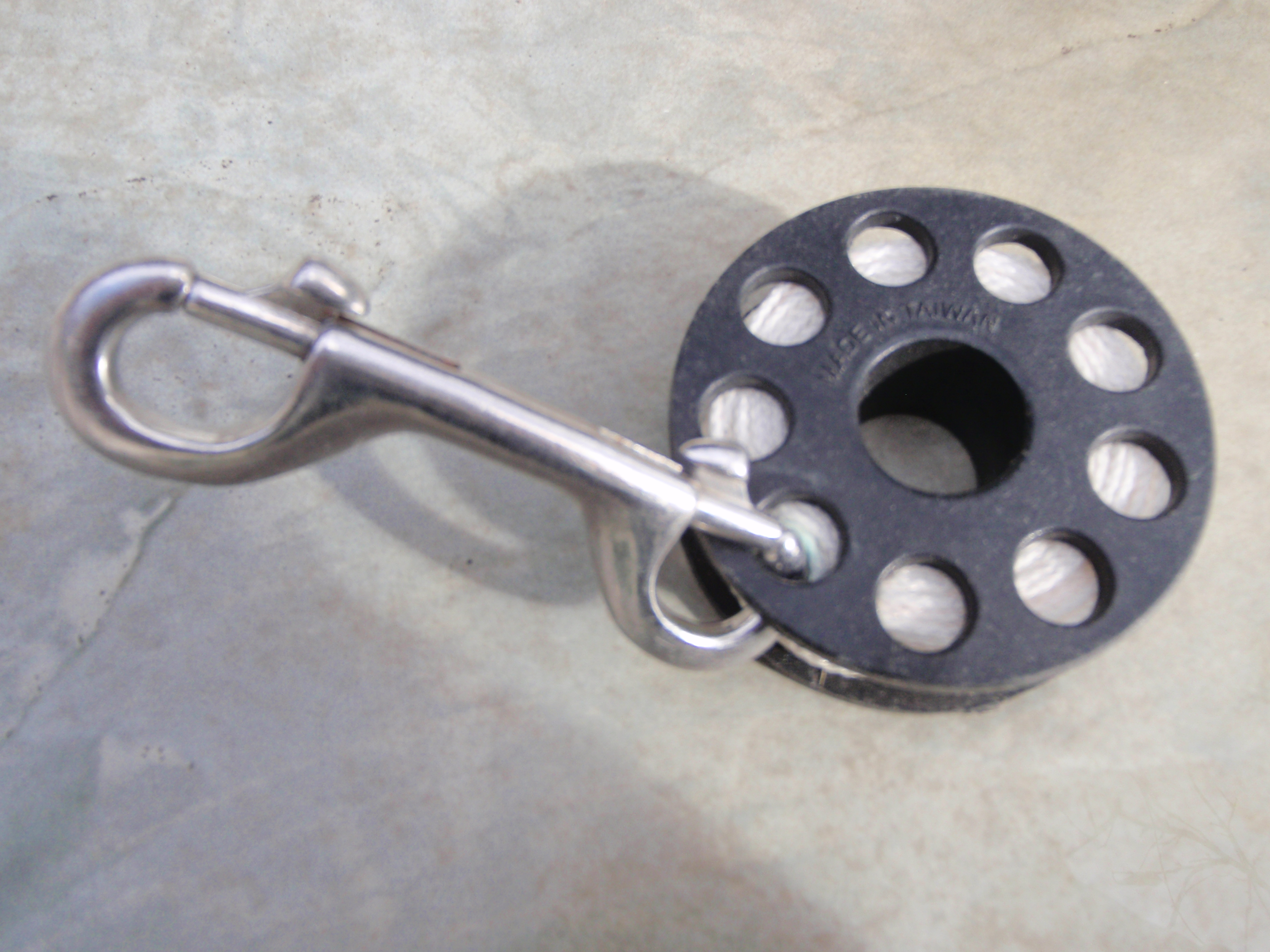
Spool with line and double-ender clip

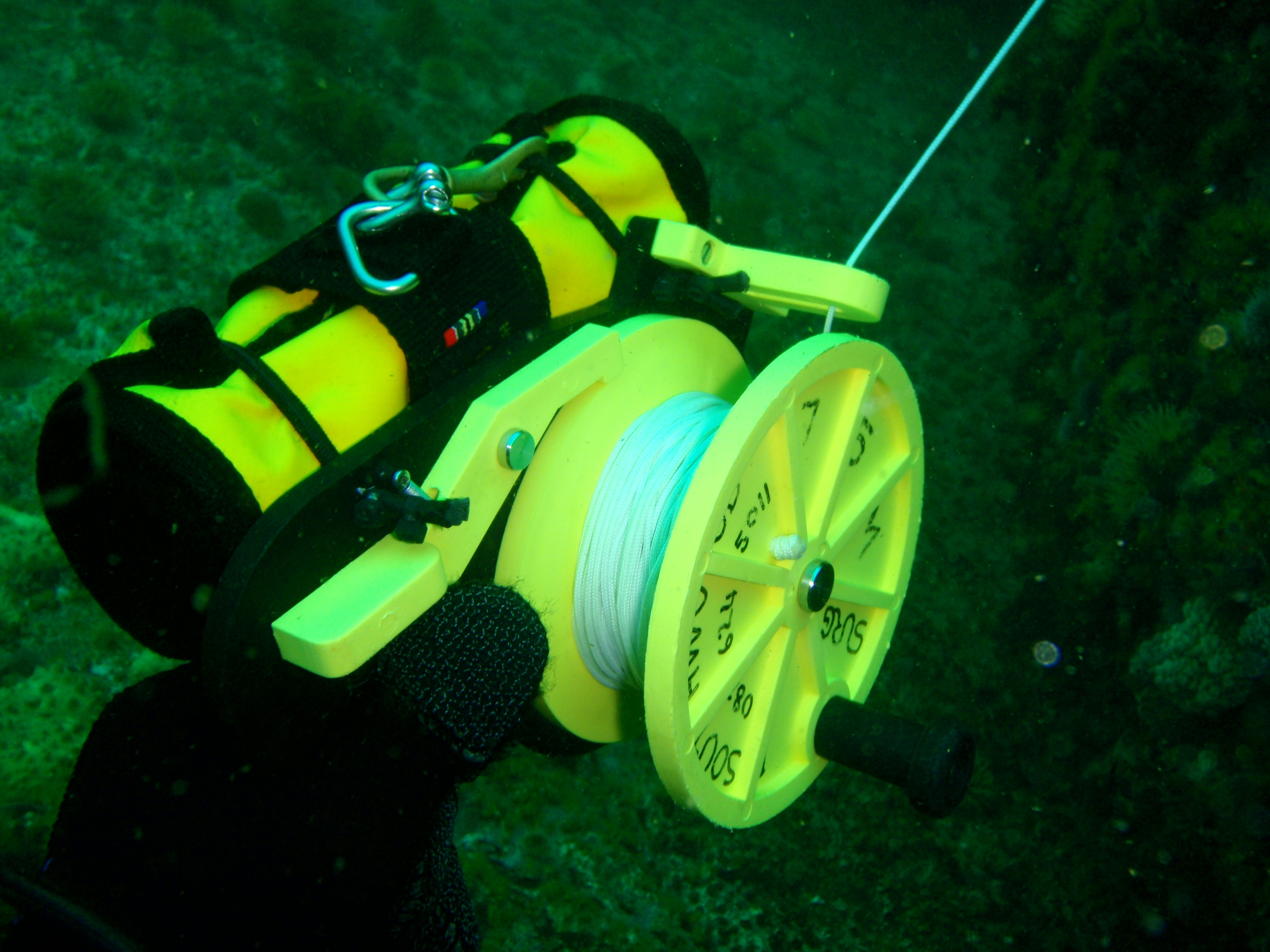
Dive reel with stored DSMB

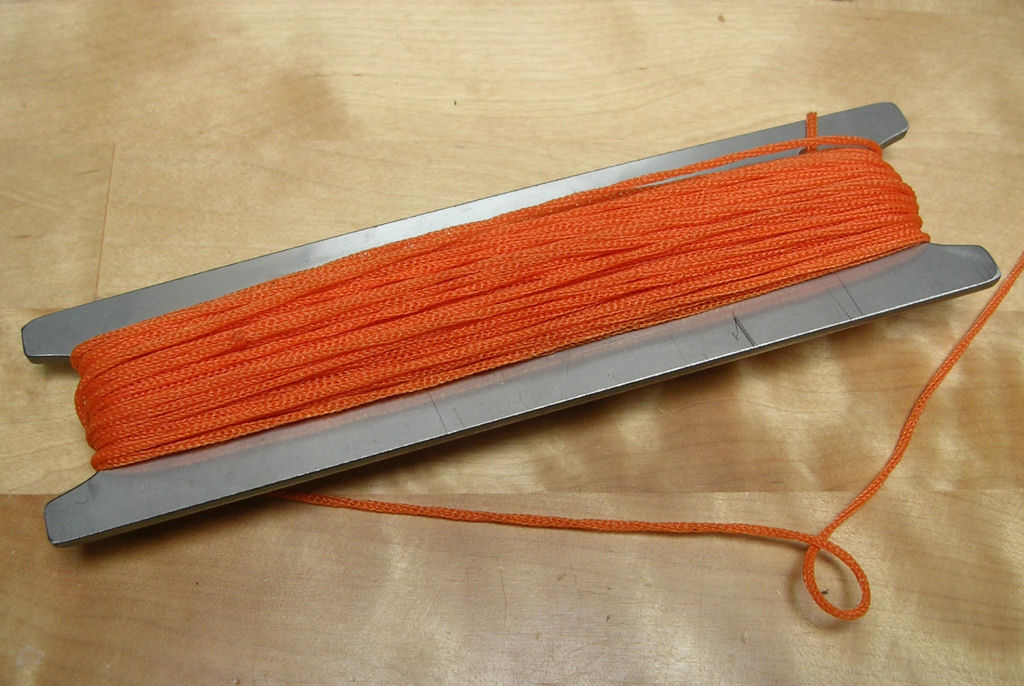
A stainless steel line holder with a 20-metre line

==== Surface detection aids ====
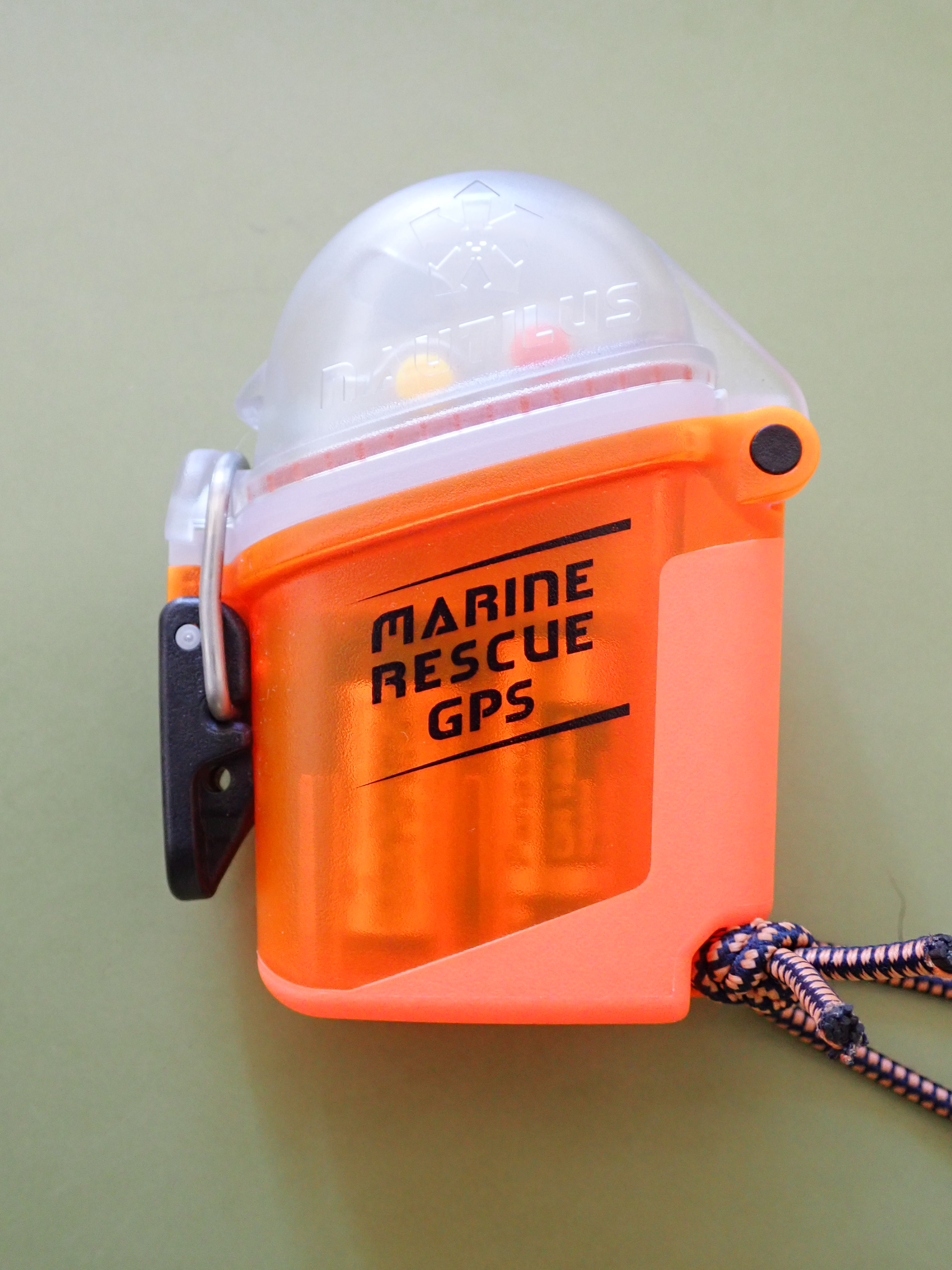
Personal locator beacon for divers - sealed for immersion

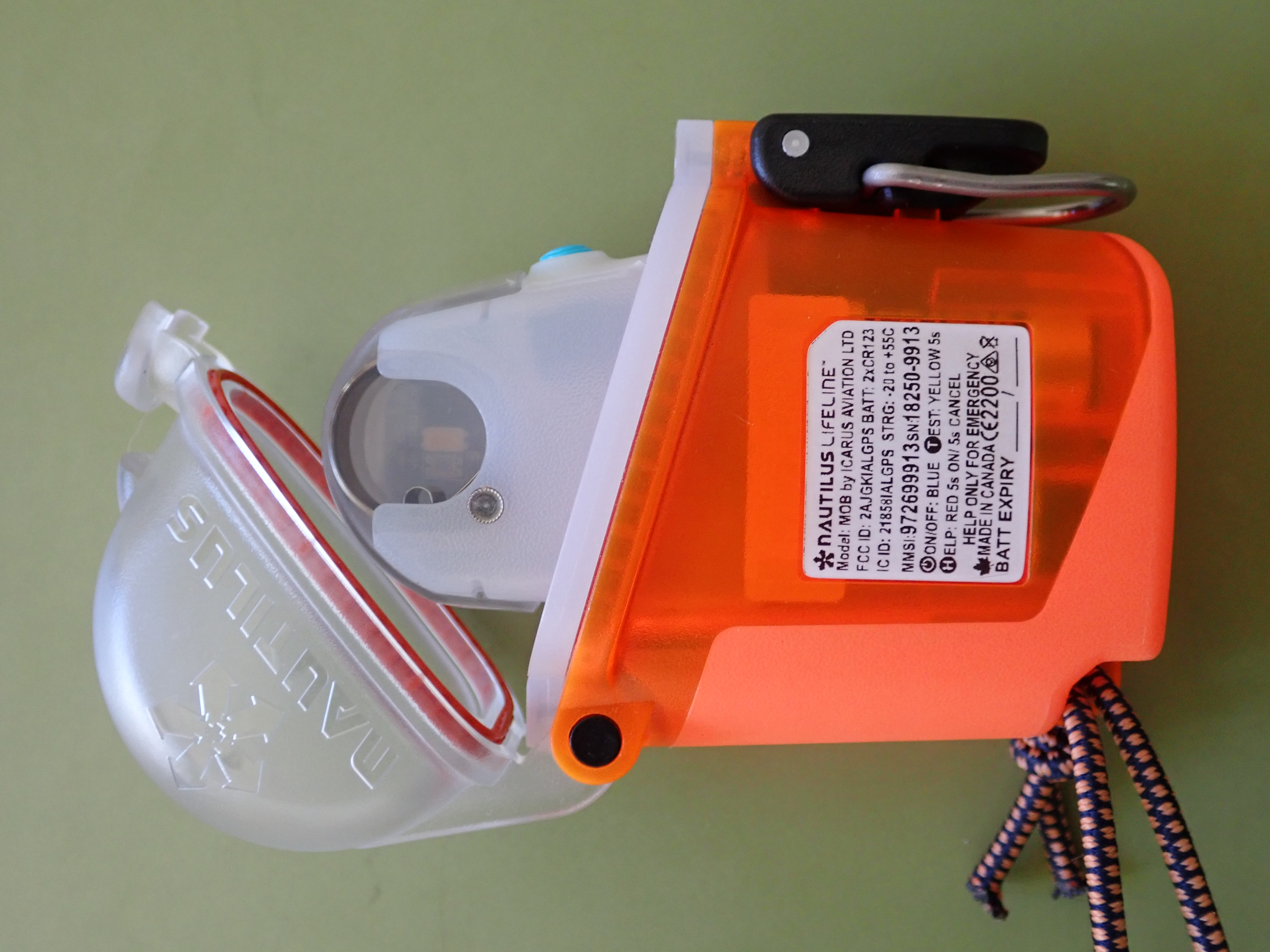
Personal locator beacon for divers - open showing coiled antenna

The purposes of this class of personal equipment are to:

- allow the support boat to monitor and find divers on the surface during or after a dive
- prevent the diver being struck by boat traffic
- mark the diver's position when drift diving or while at the decompression stop
- help rescue services in lifeboats and helicopters to locate the diver

Surface detection aids include:

- Surface marker buoy, decompression buoy, delayed SMB, safety sausage or blob
- Red or yellow collapsible flag - high visibility, robust, usually stored bungeed to cylinder
- Whistle - cheap, will only be heard by people far from engine noise
- Torch or flashlight - if at sea after nightfall
- Strobe light - needs long-lasting batteries
- High pressure whistle - expensive but effective
- Orange dye marker - increases diver's visibility from search helicopters
- Mirror such as a used compact disc - to reflect sunlight or searchlights
- Red pyrotechnic flares - for helicopters and lifeboats
- ENOS Rescue-System
- Emergency position-indicating rescue beacon (EPIRB)
- Emergency locator beacon - A transmitter carried by the diver that can send a GPS position by VHF radio and/or Automatic identification system (AIS)
- Glow stick - for night diving

==== Backup equipment ====
Backup or redundant equipment is equipment carried in case of failure of the primary equipment. This may be safety critical equipment necessary to allow safe termination of the dive or equipment carried to improve the probability of successfully completing the task of the diving operation if the primary equipment fails. The most common example of the former is bailout gas, carried routinely by solo, technical, and professional scuba divers, and most surface-supplied divers. Solo and technical divers may also carry a backup mask, dive computer, decompression gas and other equipment based on risk assessment for the planned dive. Some backup equipment may be spread amongst a diving team, when instant availability is not critical, this practice is termed team redundancy.

=== Personal tools and accessories ===
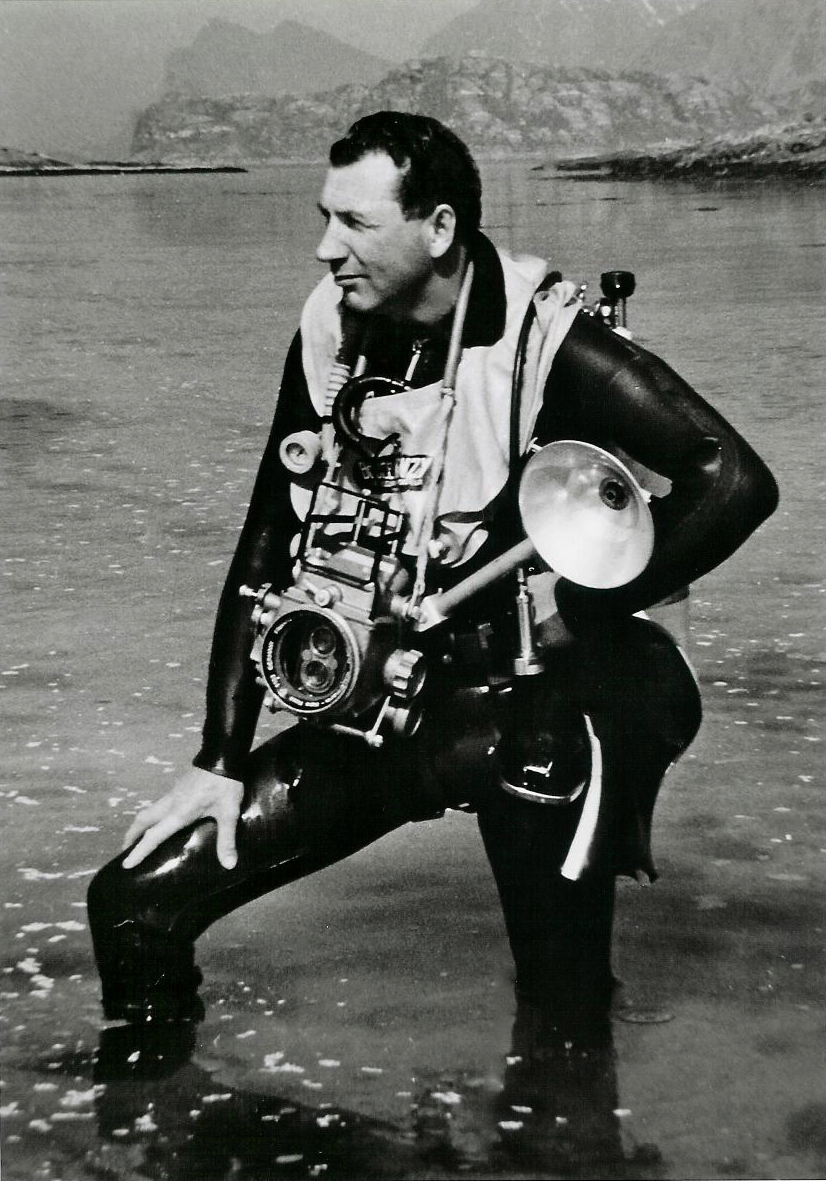
Norwegian diving pioneer Odd Henrik Johnsen with underwater camera (1960s)

- Underwater camera, strobe (flash), video lights and housing - for underwater photography or underwater videography
- Diving reel, dive spool or line holder to store and transport a distance line or line for a surface marker buoy. A dive spool, or line spool, is a short cylindrical tube with a large flange at each end, around which a length of line can be wound, and a line holder is a flat H-shaped frame or piece of rigid sheet material on which a length of line can be wound, as an alternative to a reel or spool. The line may be used with a surface marker buoy or a delayed surface marker buoy (decompression buoy), where negative buoyancy of the spool or line holder will help with unwinding the line underwater.
- Dry box to hold objects the diver needs to keep dry at depth (wallet, cell phone)
- Dry bag to carry items that must stay dry on the boat.
- Dive bag to hold personal dive equipment for travel. Soft bags are traditional for local use, when the dive gear may be wet when packed after use. For air travel, hard and soft bags, including those with wheels and telescopic handles are available.
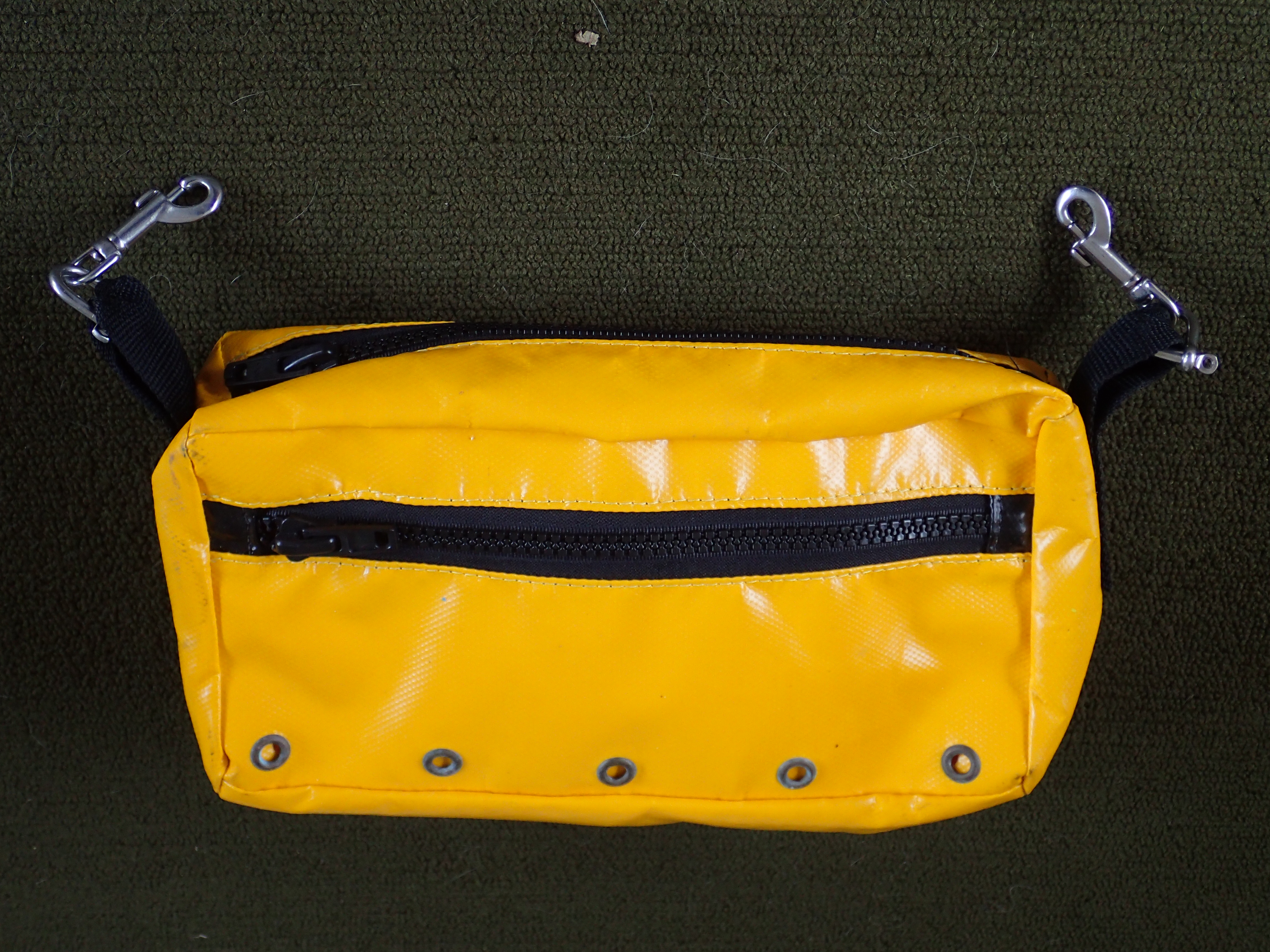
- Vinyl toolbag with bolt snaps for securing to harness
  Diving tool bag to carry tools that may be required for the job. Various types and sizes are available.
- Reef hook to hold onto a reef in a current. This is a metal rod with a handle and a bent tip to grip the reef surface. It is claimed to do less environmental damage than the diver's hand, and is also less likely for the diver to injure themself on sharp substrate. A reef hook may have a single or double claw tip, and may have a rope, webbing or coiled plastic coated lanyard, and may be clipped to the diver's harness at the other end for hands-free use. When hanging off the reef at the end of the lanyard the diver can keep sufficiently clear of the reef to prevent fin-strike damage while effortlessly maintaining position in a moderate current. Some skill is required for safe and effective use.
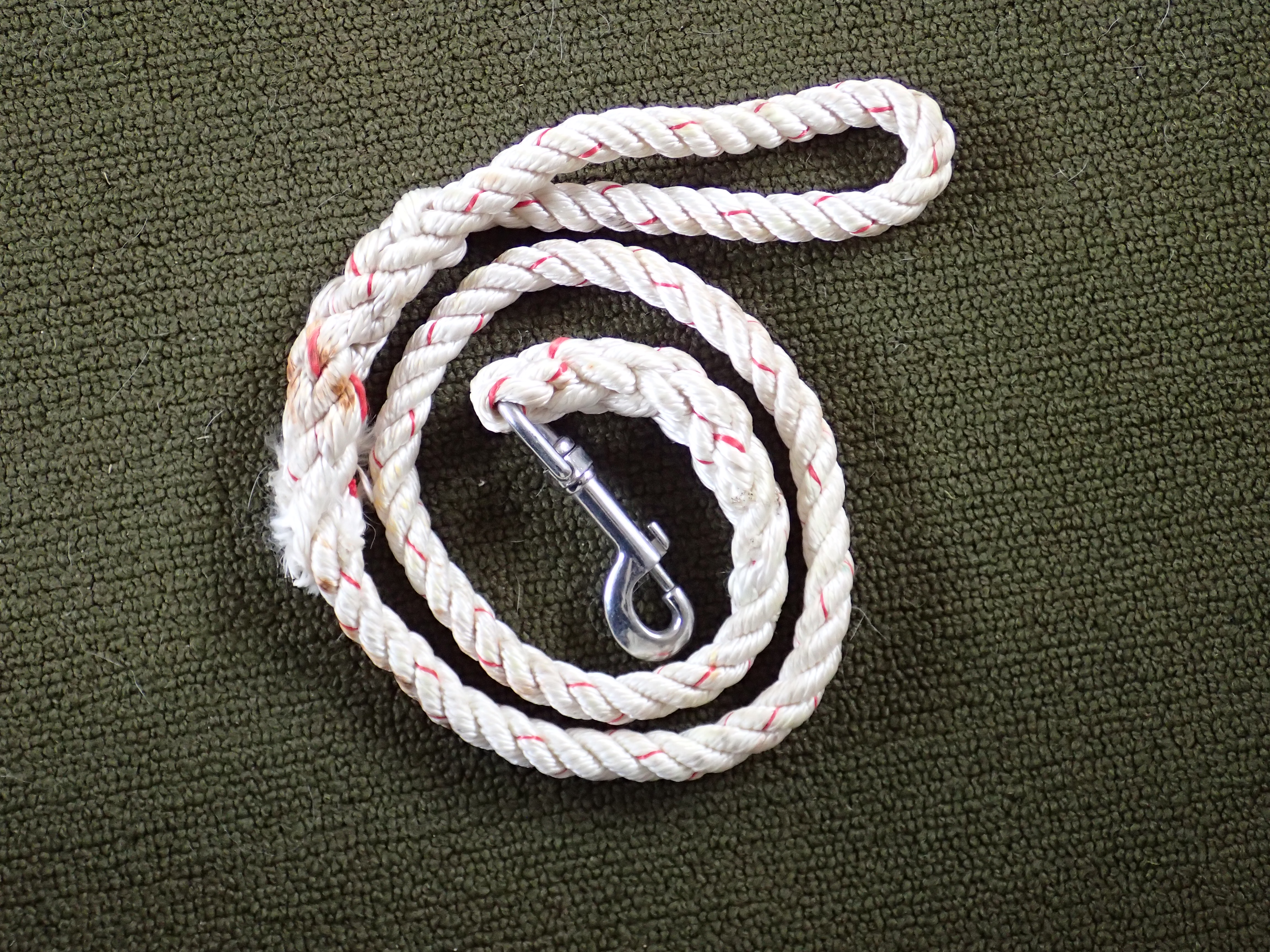
- Surface supplied diver rescue tether with soft eye and bolt snap
  A rescue tether, or rescue rope, is a short lanyard or strap carried by a surface supplied stand-by diver to be used to tether an unresponsive diver to the standby diver during a rescue. It is attached at one end to a D-ring on the stand-by diver's harness, and has a clip at the other end which may be secured to a D-ring on the casualty's harness to allow the rescuer the use of both hands during the return to the bell or surface.

== Diving team tools and equipment ==
- A jackstay is a form of guideline laid between two points to guide the diver during a search or to and from the workplace or to support and guide equipment for transport between two points.
- Lifting bags, an item of diving equipment consisting of a robust and air-tight bag with straps, which is used to lift heavy objects underwater by means of the bag's buoyancy when filled with air.
- A shot line, consisting of a weight, line and buoy, is used to mark the location and identify the ascent and descent point of a dive site, allowing divers to navigate to and from the surface and to do decompression stops at a safe location and to help control rate of ascent and descent.
- Decompression trapeze is used to assist in maintaining correct depth during in-water decompression stops.
- Diving bells and diving stages are used to transport divers from the surface to the underwater workplace.
- A downline is a line from the surface to underwater workplace used to control descent, ascent and the transfer of tools, materials and other equipment between the surface and the workplace. A weighted version suspended from the surface is used to control working depth when blue-water diving, It is similar in function to a jackstay, with an emphasis on the vertical dimension. The terms are largely interchangeable – a downline can be considered a predominantly vertical jackstay.

== Surface support equipment connected with diving and underwater work ==
International diving flag

Informal Recreational diving flag

- Boarding ladders, particularly the Christmas tree ladder configuration, with a single central rail and cantilevered rungs on both sides, which allows a diver to climb while wearing fins.
- Breathing gas analysis equipment.
- Dive platforms (or swim platforms) on boats.
- Diver down flag which is flown to warn others that divers are underwater in the vicinity
- Diver lifts, to conveniently transport a diver from the deck level into the water near the surface and back out in full equipment.
- Diving air compressors and gas boosters to fill diving cylinders with high pressure air or other gasses.
- Diving chambers for surface decompression and treatment of decompression illness
- Diving support vessels
  - Dive boats
    - Day boats, which may be rigid-hulled inflatable boats
    - Live-aboard dive boat
  - Dynamically positioned vessels
- Echo sounder, side-scan sonar and multi-beam sonar for location, depth measurement, and profiling of dive sites
- GPS receiver - for locating dive sites
- Surface-supplied diving breathing gas supply system, including:
  - Low pressure breathing air compressors
  - High pressure gas storage equipment
  - Breathing gas distribution panels
  - Diver's umbilicals
  - Diver voice communications equipment
  - Gas reclaim system for deep heliox diving
  - Gas blending systems
- Gas blending systems for scuba diving
- Hot water systems for supply of heating water to divers wearing hot water suits
- Light and shape signals indicating underwater operations
- Marine VHF radio - for communicating with rescue services and other vessels
- Proton magnetometer - for locating ferrous wrecks
- Saturation systems providing surface support for saturation diving.
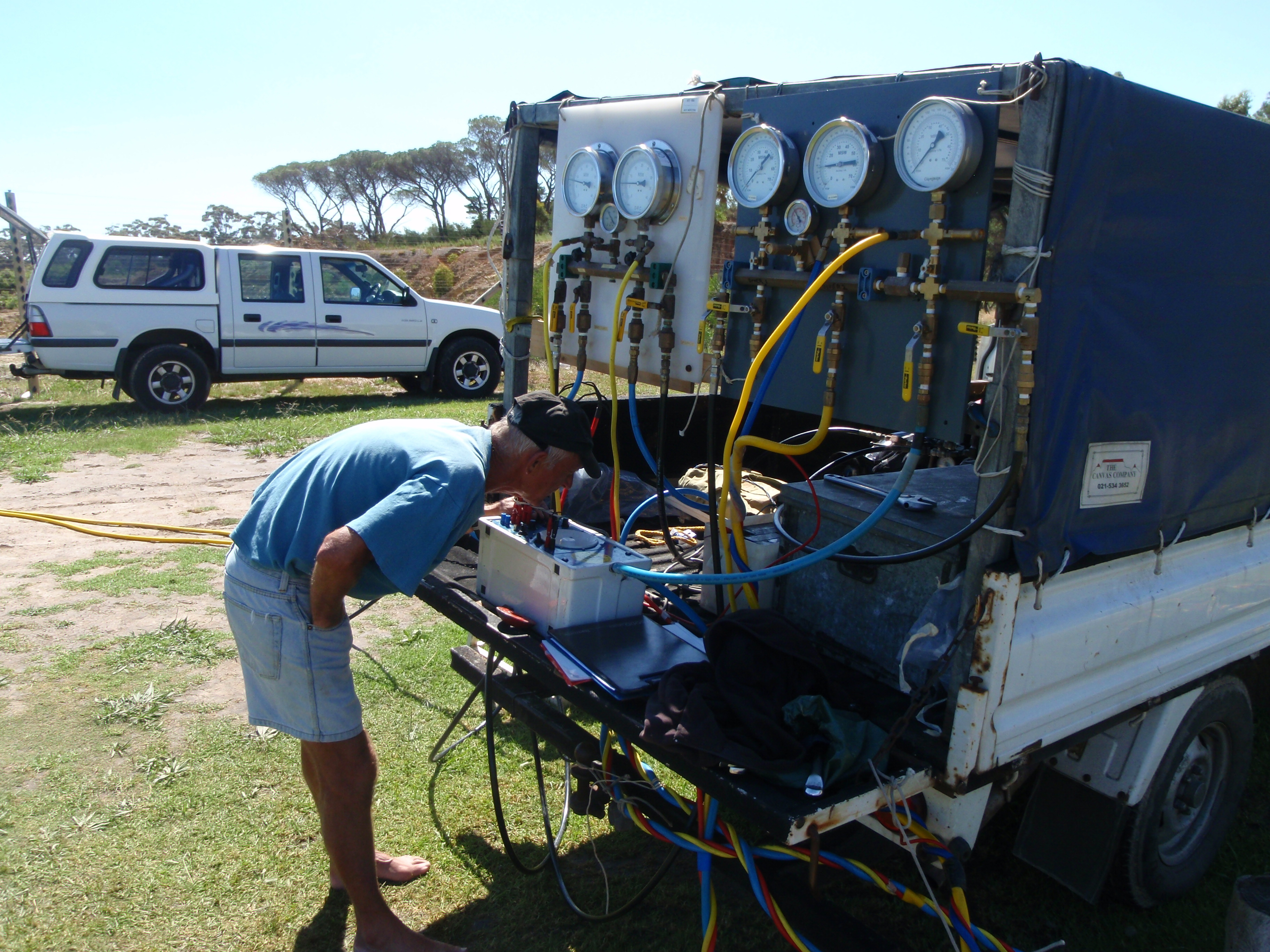
Surface supply air panels. On the left for two divers, on the right for three divers

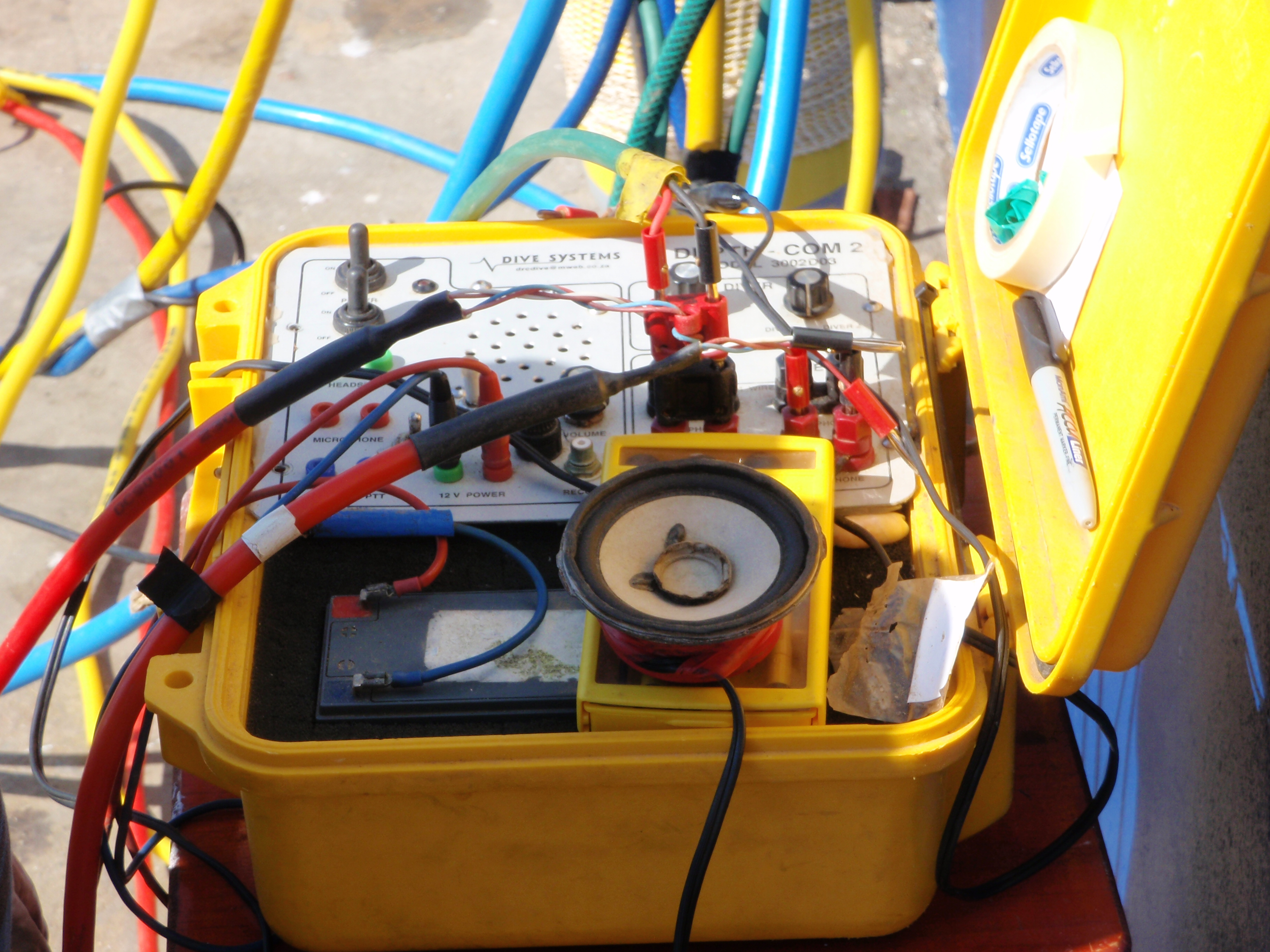
A hard-wired diver communications unit mounted in a waterproof box for convenience of transport and protection.

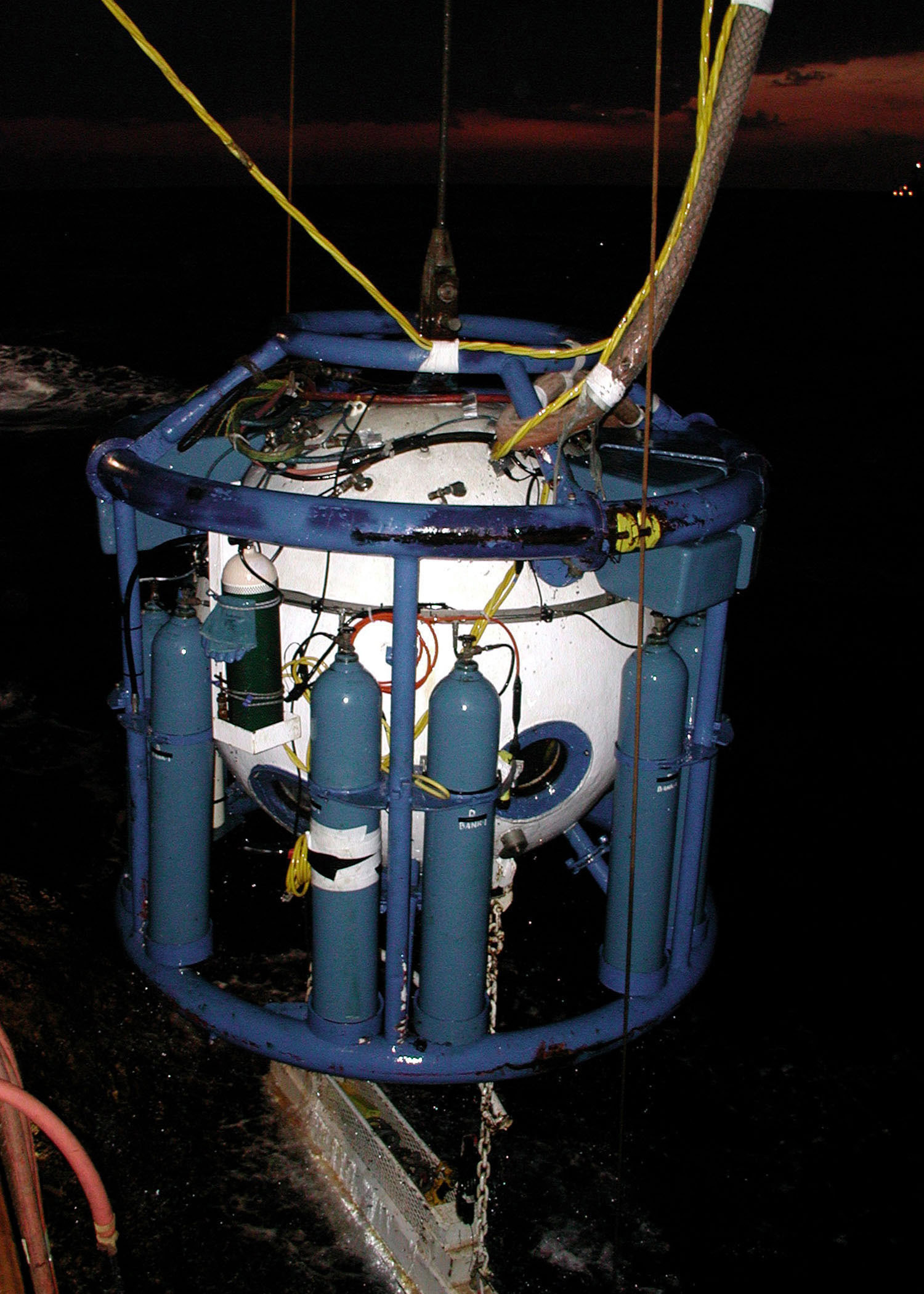
Personnel Transfer Capsule - a dry bell

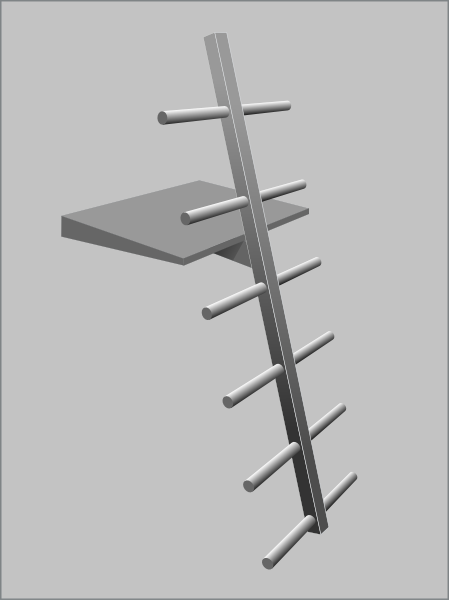
Christmas tree style diver's boarding ladder

== Special equipment for underwater work not carried by the diver ==
Tools and equipment too large or too heavy to be carried by a diver are generally lowered to the worksite from the surface platform. They are mostly used in professional diving applications.

- Remotely operated underwater vehicle - for locating dive sites, observing the environment, conducting visual searches, monitoring divers or performing physical work
- Large lifting bags and their rigging.
- Airlift and pump suction dredges
- Hydraulic jackhammers,
- Tremies and concrete placement skips

== Maintenance and testing ==
Life support equipment must be maintained and tested before use to ensure that it remains in serviceable condition and is fit for use at the time. Pre-dive inspection and testing of equipment at some level is standard procedure for all modes and applications of diving. The use of checklists is known to improve reliability of inspection and testing, and may be required by the applicable code of practice or operations manual, or manufacturer's operating instructions. Inadequate pre-dive checks of breathing apparatus can have fatal consequences for some equipment, such as rebreathers, or may require the diving operation to be aborted without achieving its objective.

Maintenance can be categorised as:

- Planned periodical maintenance, such as annual service and inspection of breathing apparatus, pressure equipment, lifting gear and other items according to manufacturers' recommendations or legislation.
- Cleaning and inspection after use, and appropriate storage. A large part of this is washing off salt water to prevent it from drying on the equipment and leaving corrosive brine or abrasive salt deposits, which can cause accelerated deterioration of some materials and jamming of moving parts. The ultraviolet component of sunlight can also damage non-metallic components and equipment, and ozone produced by electrical equipment is known to adversely affect some materials, such as the latex seals on dry suits. Most diving equipment will last better if stored in a cool, dry, well ventilated place out of direct sunlight.

=== Decontamination and disinfection ===
Diving equipment may be exposed to contamination in use and when this happens it must be decontaminated This is a particular issue for hazmat diving, but incidental contamination can occur in other environments. Personal diving equipment shared by more than one user requires disinfection before use. Shared use is common for expensive commercial diving equipment, and for rental recreational equipment, and some items such as demand valves, masks, helmets and snorkels which are worn over the face or held in the mouth are possible vectors for infection by a variety of pathogens. Diving suits are also likely to be contaminated, but less likely to transmit infection directly.

When disinfecting diving equipment it is necessary to consider the effectiveness of the disinfectant on the expected pathogens, and the possible adverse effects on the equipment. Some highly effective methods for disinfection can damage the equipment, or cause accelerated degradation of components due to incompatibility with materials.

== Development, manufacture and marketing ==
The diving equipment market sectors are commercial diving, military diving, recreational and technical scuba, freediving, and snorkelling. with scientific diving using a mix of recreational, technical, and commercial equipment.

The commercial diving market is relatively small, but occupational safety issues keep cost of operations high and there is work that must be done in support of various industries, particularly the oil and gas industry, that make money available for high reliability equipment in small quantities. The military market is similarly constrained by small quantities, and there is a lot of overlap with commercial equipment where the applications are similar, but the technical requirements for stealth operations drive development of different equipment.

Recreational scuba and snorkelling are the largest markets, in which there is the most competition between manufacturers for market share, and in which the buyers are least knowledgeable about the technology and most susceptible to persuasion by advertising.

Technical diving is a niche market, where the buyers are willing to take higher risks than commercial operators, and there is enough money available to support a small number of manufacturers developing new technology. Scientific diving is also a small market, and tends to overlap the other sectors, using what is available, and occasionally driving development of new technology for special applications.

=== History ===
With the partial exception of breath-hold diving, the development of underwater diving capacity, scope, and popularity, has been closely linked to available technology, and the physiological constraints of the underwater environment which the technology allows divers to partially overcome.

=== DEMA ===
Diving Equipment and Marketing Association
- Abbreviation: DEMA
- Formation: 1987
- Type: Trade Association
- Legal status: Mutual-benefit nonprofit corporation Incorporated in California,
- Purpose: Advocacy for the recreational diving industry
- Headquarters: California, United States of America
- Members: 1,300
- Website: www.dema.org
- Formerly called: Diving Equipment Manufacturers Association

The Diving Equipment and Marketing Association (DEMA, formerly the Diving Equipment Manufacturers Association), is an international organization for the promotion and growth of the recreational scuba diving and snorkeling industry. It is a non-profit, global organization with more than 1,300 members, which promotes scuba diving through consumer awareness programs and media campaigns such as the national Be a Diver campaign; diver retention initiatives such as DiveCaching; and an annual trade-only event for businesses in the scuba diving, action watersports and adventure/dive-travel industries, DEMA Show. Board Members serve three-year terms.

The purposes and objectives of the Association are published as:

- To promote the advancement of the diving industry, to promote and encourage the growth of diving activities, and to enhance the growth and public enjoyment of the sport of diving.
- To establish continuing business education programs to aid industry members, their officers and employees.
- To facilitate the exchange of information among industry members, through experts, internet-based programming, manuals and conferences, and other media on such subjects as quality control, general industry statistics, governmental regulations, product standards and/or certification, standardized methods of keeping books and records, and related topics of industry interest.
- To support the diving industry with communication services, media relations and resources.
- To support the diving industry in monitoring and communicating on legislation that impacts diving and to represent the industry before the executive, legislative and judicial branches of government throughout the United States and in foreign jurisdictions.
- To support the diving industry in the monitoring and protection of the environment through education and activities.

== Standards ==
National and international standards have been published for the manufacture and testing of diving equipment for quality assurance and user safety.

Underwater breathing apparatus

- EN 14143-2003 Respiratory equipment - Self-contained re-breathing diving apparatus
- BS EN 1802:2002 Transportable gas cylinders. Periodic inspection and testing of seamless aluminium alloy gas cylinders
- BS EN 1968:2002 Transportable gas cylinders. Periodic inspection and testing of seamless steel gas cylinders
- EN250:2000 Respiratory equipment. Open-circuit self-contained compressed air diving apparatus. Requirements, testing, marking defines minimum performance standards for "Open-circuit self-contained compressed air diving apparatus".
- BS 8547:2016 defines requirements for demand regulators to be used at depths exceeding 50 m.
- EN 13949: 2003 – Respiratory Equipment – Open Circuit Self-Contained Diving Apparatus for use with Compressed Nitrox and Oxygen – Requirements, Testing, Marking defines requirements for regulators to be used with raised levels of oxygen.
- EN 250: 2014 – Respiratory Equipment – Open Circuit Self - Contained Compressed Air Diving Apparatus – Requirements, Testing and Marking defines the minimum requirements for breathing performance of regulators,

Swim fins

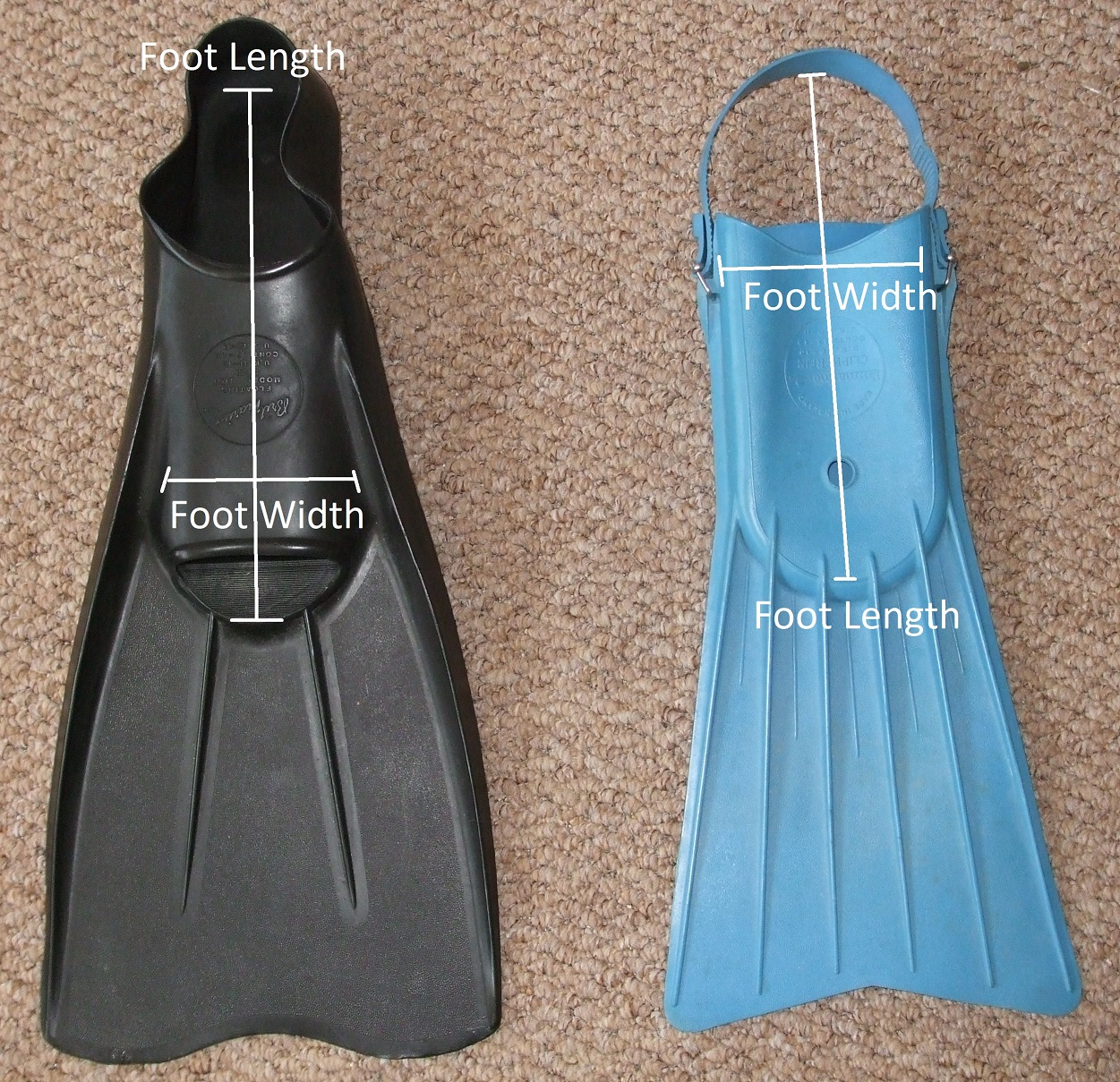
DIN 7876 swim fin footspace length and width measurements.

- MIL-S-82258:1965 US Military specification. Swim fins, rubber.
- GOST 22469:1977 USSR/CIS standard, Ласты резиновые для плавания. Общие технические условия. Swimming rubber flippers. General specifications.
- DIN 7876:1980 German standard, Tauchzubehör. Schwimmflossen. Maße, Anforderungen und Prüfung. Diving accessories for skin divers. Flippers. Dimensions, requirements and testing.
- BN-82/8444-17.02 Polish Industry standard. Gumowy sprzęt pływacki - Płetwy pływackie (Rubber swimming equipment - Swimming fins).
- MS 974:1985 Malaysian standard, Specification for rubber swimming fins.
- ÖNORM S 4224:1988 Austrian standard, Tauch-Zubehör; Schwimmflossen; Abmessungen, sicherheitstechnische Anforderungen, Prüfung, Normkennzeichnung. Diving accessories; fins; dimensions, safety requirements, testing, marking of conformity.
- MS 974:2002 Malaysian standard, Specification for rubber swimming fins. First revision.
- EN 16804:2015 European standard, Diving equipment. Diving open heel fins. Requirements and test methods.

Diving masks

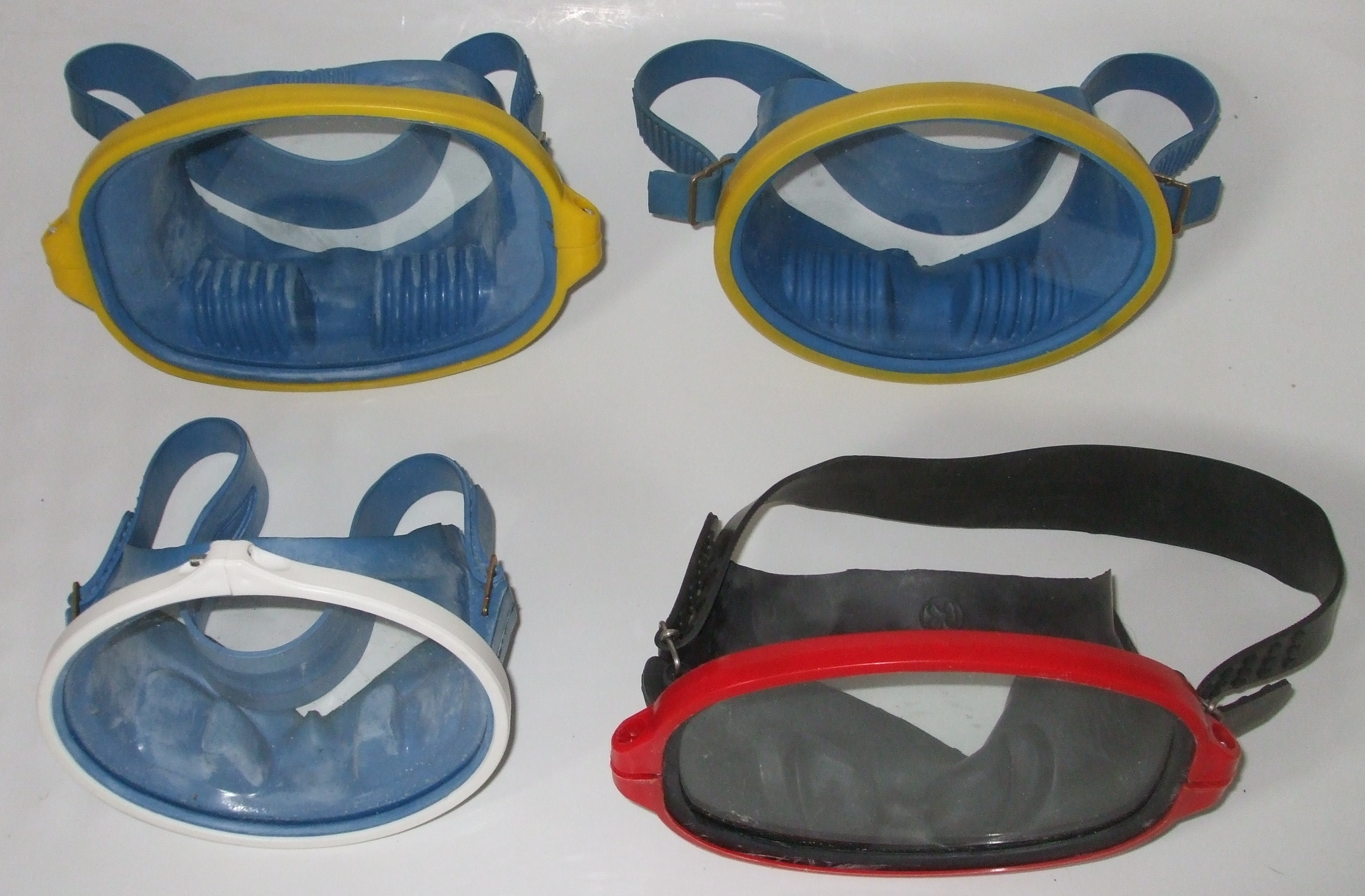
GOST 20568 compliant Russian and Ukrainian diving masks.

- BS 4532:1969 British standard, Specification for snorkels and face masks. Amended 1977.
- GOST 20568:1975 USSR/CIS standard, Маски резиновые для плавания под водой. Общие технические условие. Rubber masks for submarine swimming. General specifications.
- DIN 7877:1980 German standard, Tauch-Zubehör. Tauchbrillen. Sicherheitstechnische Anforderungen und Prüfung. Diving accessories for skin divers. Diver's masks. Requirements and testing.
- BN-82/8444-17.01 Polish Industry standard, Gumowy sprzęt pływacki - Maski pływackie (Rubber swimming equipment - Swimming masks).
- ANSI Z87.11:1985 American National Standard, Underwater Safety. Recreational Skin and Scuba Diving. Lenses for Masks.
- ÖNORM S 4225:1988 Austrian standard, Tauch-Zubehör; Tauchmasken (Tauchbrillen); Sicherheitstechnische Anforderungen, Prüfung, Normkennzeichnung. Diving accessories; divers' masks; safety requirements, testing, marking of conformity.
- CNS 12497:1989 Chinese National Standard, 潛水鏡. Diving mask.
- CNS 12498:1989 Chinese National Standard, 潛水鏡檢驗法. Method of test for diving mask.
- EN 16805:2015 European standard, Diving equipment. Diving mask. Requirements and test methods.

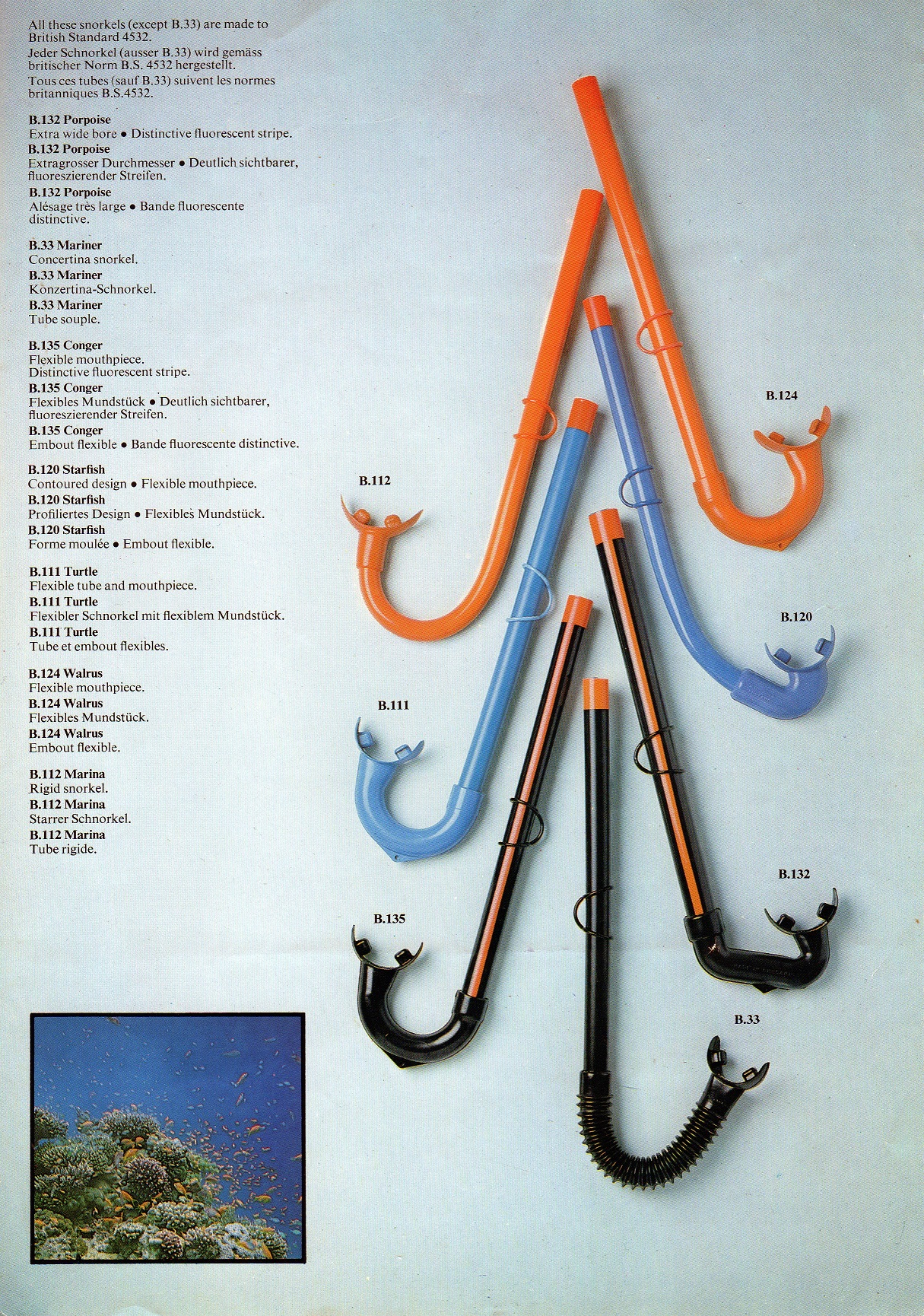
A range of 1970s snorkels made to British Standard BS 4532

Snorkels

- BS 4532:1969 British standard, Specification for snorkels and face masks. Amended 1977.
- DIN 7878:1980 German standard, Tauch-Zubehör; Schnorchel; Maße, Anforderungen, Prüfung. Diving accessories for skin divers. Snorkel. Technical requirements of safety, testing.
- ÖNORM S 4223:1988 Austrian standard, Tauch-Zubehör; Schnorchel; Abmessungen, sicherheitstechnische Anforderungen, Prüfung, Normkennzeichnung. Diving accessories; snorkels; dimensions, safety requirements, testing, marking of conformity.
- DIN 7878:1991 German standard, Tauch-Zubehör; Schnorchel; Sicherheitstechnische Anforderungen und Prüfung. Diving accessories for skin divers. Snorkel. Safety requirements and testing.
- EN 1972:1997 – European standard for design and manufacture of snorkels European standard, Diving accessories. Snorkels. Safety requirements.
- EN 1972:2015 European standard, Diving equipment. Snorkels. Requirements and test methods.

Buoyancy compensators

- BN-82/8444-17.05 Polish Industry standard. Gumowy sprzęt pływacki - Kamizelki pływackie (Rubber swimming equipment - Swim vest).
- EN 1809:1998 Diving accessories. Buoyancy compensators. Functional and safety requirements, test methods.
- EN 1809:2014+A1:2016 Diving equipment. Buoyancy compensators. Functional and safety requirements, test methods.

Wetsuits

- CNS 11251:1985 濕式潛水衣. Diving Wet Suit.
- EN 14225-1:2005 Diving suits. Wet suits. Requirements and test methods. EN 14225-1:2017 Diving suits. Wet suits. Requirements and test methods.

Dry suits

- EN 14225-2:2002 Diving suits. Dry suits. Requirements and test methods. EN 14225-2:2017 Diving suits. Dry suits. Requirements and test methods.

Depth gauges

- EN 13319:2000 Diving accessories. Depth gauges and combined depth and time measuring devices. Functional and safety requirements, test methods.
