= Drift diving =

Scuba diving where the diver is intentionally transported by the water flow

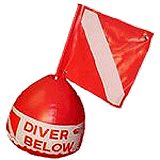
Surface marker buoy to track a group of divers

Drift diving is a type of scuba diving where a diver is transported by water movement caused by the tide, an ocean current or in a river. The choice whether to drift dive depends on the purpose of the dive and whether there is an option. At some sites there is almost always a current running, and at others the strength and direction of water movement may vary with the tide, or other driving forces, like wind or recent rainfall. At some sites there may be considerable variation in visibility and underwater life activity based on the speed and direction of flow.

The current gives the diver the impression of flying and allows the diver to cover long distances underwater, possibly seeing more habitats and formations than usual. Often drift diving is performed more for the experience of underwater "flight" and less for interactions with underwater life, which, given the speed at which most divers move, are reduced.

== Environment ==
Drift diving is defined by the diver being primarily carried by the flow of water, so can be done anywhere that the water flow is suitable. This generally implies tolerable turbulence, and mainly horizontal flow. Blue-water diving and black-water diving in mid-water are usually drift diving, and wall diving is often drift diving when a current flows along the wall. Drift diving is also commonly done over relatively flat bottoms, and the depth may be variable or fairly constant. Current speed can also vary, often depending on how close to the reef one is at the time, and on the shape of the bottom, as the speed is generally slower in hollows, and faster over ridges across the flow direction.

=== Hazards ===
Currents may be variable in speed and direction, and the dive may not end exactly where planned. This is not usually a problem when a boat is following the divers, but on shore dives the dive may not end at a convenient place to exit. Variable current speed can make it more difficult to stay together in a group. Even buddy pairs need to pay attention to this or they will be separated. Buoyancy control is also more important, as the speed of the dive can make it easier to hit objects on the sea floor, such as reefs. It is recommended to secure any dangling equipment to avoid becoming entangled.

== Skills ==
The skills used in drift diving are not fundamentally different from the skills of scuba diving in similar circumstances in water without current. The main differences are in awareness of position and movement relative to the fixed surroundings, and avoiding and managing impacts and entanglement. Drift diving skills are not generally included in basic entry level recreational scuba training, but may be included in entry level professional diver training. Some diver training agencies offer drift diving training as a specialty part of their Advanced Open Water Diver training.

== Procedures ==
Drift dives can be done from the shore, but this requires some form of transport to pick up the divers where they come ashore, which is usually not accurately predictable, so it is more commonly done from a boat, which will follow the group and pick up divers as they surface. It may be possible to follow the divers by watching the bubbles, but a more reliable method is for the dive leader to tow a surface marker buoy, and for all the divers of the group to follow the leader. If a diver or buddy pair finds it necessary to surface before the leader they will ascend up the float line if possible, as this will surface them where the boat crew expects and is watching. Divers that are separated from the group are generally advised to deploy a decompression buoy and ascend on their own line, as the buoy will alert the surface crew to a separate group, and will also help other boat traffic to notice and avoid running the divers down as they reach the surface. Divers ascending on the float line should avoid exerting force on the line, as that will inconvenience the dive leader. Using a line from a drifting boat has been done, but it constrains the boat from maneuvering freely to pick up separated divers, the boat may tend to drift differently from divers at the bottom, and it may be necessary for all the divers to be towed by the drifting boat to stay together. This is more practical with canoe or kayak diving, where the vessel is light and windage is low.

=== Planning ===
Drift diving requires more rigorous planning than a dive in still water to be executed safely. Drift diving is generally not planned to coincide with slack water, but this can vary depending on the strength of the stream. It is important to consider the direction of tidal streams as well as their strength to avoid divers being swept into dangerous areas such as shipping lanes or areas known to have entanglement hazards. It is also important to plan for the possibility of separation, either underwater or at the surface.

=== Precautions ===
A common precaution for drift diving is to have a supporting boat follow the divers and for the dive leader to use a surface marker buoy. It is also generally necessary for all divers intending to drift dive as a group to enter the water at the same time, so there is less chance of being separated by the flow. It is quite common for current speeds to vary with depth, so a low drag buoy and line will reduce the workload on the diver carrying the reel. Mitigation equipment for separation may include signaling devices and a compass, and a personal DSMB and reel or spool. Since the intention is to drift with the current in a group, there is normally no need for a negative buoyancy entry, but to stay together it is helpful if the dive leader descends first and the other divers follow down, either visually or following the surface marker line.

== Equipment ==
Most of the equipment is identical to that for a recreational dive in similar environment in the absence of a current. The exceptions are the use of a surface marker buoy by the dive leader, and delayed surface marker buoys carried by divers for deployment if they become separated from the dive leader.

== Legislation ==
There may be local rules pertaining to the use of surface marker buoys. In some parts of the world, surface marker buoys alone are not legally sufficient signaling devices, and one of the international diver down flags (in an appropriate size), might be required while drift diving.
