= List of diving environments by type =

Variety of environments that people may dive in

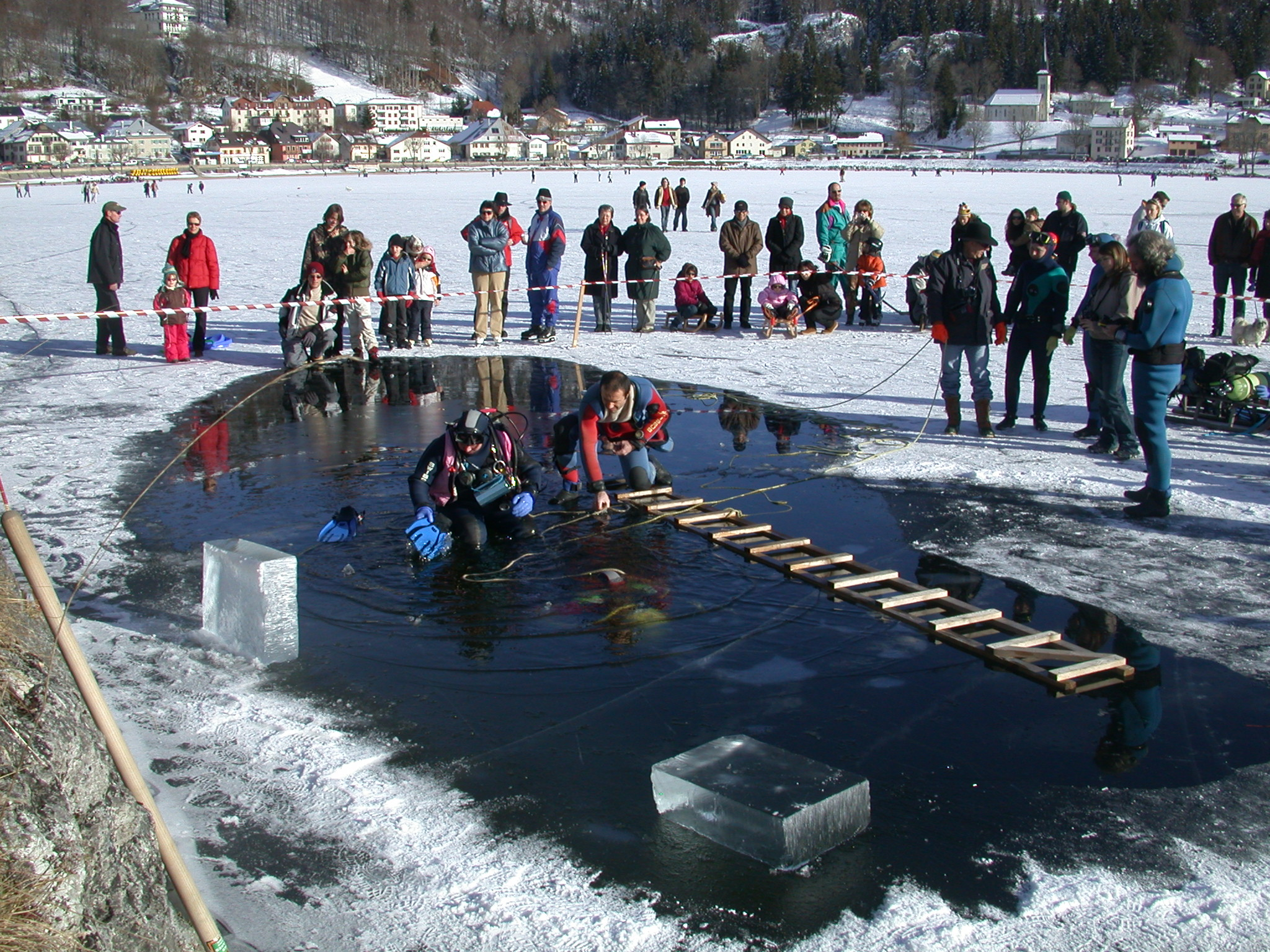
Ice diving

The diving environment is the natural or artificial surroundings in which a dive is done. It is usually underwater, but professional diving is sometimes done in other liquids. Underwater diving is the human practice of voluntarily descending below the surface of the water to interact with the surroundings, for various recreational or occupational reasons, but the concept of diving also legally extends to immersion in other liquids, and exposure to other pressurised environments. Some of the more common diving environments are listed and defined here.

The diving environment is limited by accessibility and risk, but includes water and occasionally other liquids. Most underwater diving is done in the shallower coastal parts of the oceans, and inland bodies of fresh water, including lakes, dams, quarries, rivers, springs, flooded caves, reservoirs, tanks, swimming pools, and canals, but may also be done in large bore ducting and sewers, power station cooling systems, cargo and ballast tanks of ships, and liquid-filled industrial equipment. The environment may affect equipment configuration: for instance, freshwater is less dense than saltwater, so less added weight is needed to achieve diver neutral buoyancy in freshwater dives. Water temperature, visibility and movement also affect the diver and the dive plan. Diving in liquids other than water may present special problems due to density, viscosity and chemical compatibility of diving equipment, as well as possible environmental hazards to the diving team.

Benign conditions, sometimes also referred to as confined water, are environments of low risk, where it is extremely unlikely or impossible for the diver to get lost or entrapped, or be exposed to hazards other than the basic underwater environment. These conditions are suitable for initial training in the critical survival skills, and include swimming pools, training tanks, aquarium tanks and some shallow and protected shoreline areas.

Open water is unrestricted water such as a sea, lake or flooded quarry, where the diver has unobstructed direct vertical access to the surface of the water in contact with the atmosphere. Open-water diving implies that if a problem arises, the diver can directly ascend vertically to the atmosphere to breathe air. Wall diving is done along a near vertical face. Blue-water diving is done in mid-water where the bottom is out of sight of the diver and there may be no fixed visual reference. Black-water diving is mid-water diving at night, particularly on a moonless night.

An overhead or penetration diving environment is where the diver enters a space from which there is no direct, purely vertical ascent to the safety of breathable atmosphere at the surface. Cave diving, wreck diving, ice diving and diving inside or under other natural or artificial underwater structures or enclosures are examples. The restriction on direct ascent increases the risk of diving under an overhead, and this is usually addressed by adaptations of procedures and use of equipment such as redundant breathing gas sources and guide lines to indicate the route to the exit.

Night diving can allow the diver to experience a different underwater environment, because many marine animals are nocturnal. Altitude diving, for example in mountain lakes, requires modifications to the decompression schedule because of the reduced atmospheric pressure.

== Recreational dive sites ==
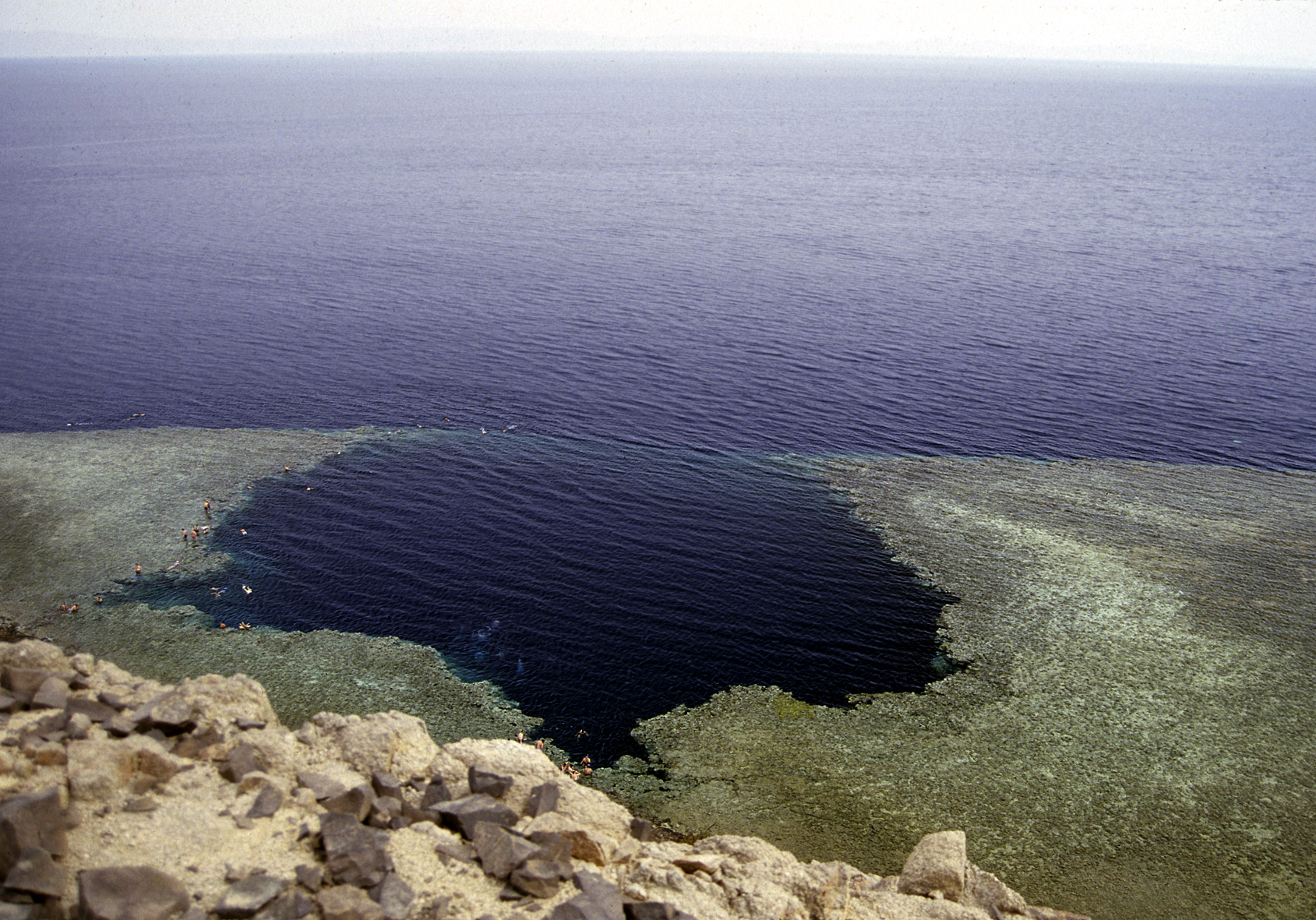
The Blue Hole in Dahab, Egypt, a world-renowned recreational dive site

The common term for a place at which one may dive is a dive site. As a general rule, professional diving is done where the work needs to be done, and recreational diving is done where conditions are suitable. There are many recorded and publicised recreational dive sites which are known for their convenience, points of interest, and frequently favourable conditions.

Recreational dive sites – Places that divers go to enjoy the underwater environment

- Index of recreational dive sites – Alphabetical listing of articles on porular places for recreational diving
- Inland dive sites – Sites in bodies of water inland of the sea coastline
- Coastal dive sites – Sites in the sea near the coastline
- Flooded caves – Natural void under a planetary surface
- Coral reefs – Outcrop of rock in the sea formed by the growth and deposit of stony coral skeletons
- Lakes – Large inland body of relatively still water
- Muck diving – Recreational diving on a loose sedimentary bottom
- Flooded quarries – Disused and flooded quarry repurposed for underwater diving
- Rocky reef – Natural reef of rock
- Wreck diving – Recreational diving on wrecks

== Diver training sites ==
Diver training facilities for both professional and recreational divers generally use a small range of dive sites which are familiar and convenient, and where conditions are predictable and the environmental risk is relatively low.

- Swimming pool – Artificial water basin for swimming
- Diver training tank – Tank of water to practice diving skills
- Confined water – A diving environment that is enclosed and bounded sufficiently for safe training
- Open water – Unrestricted water with free vertical access to the surface

== Hyperbaric treatment and transport environments ==
Physiologically and legally, a compression in a diving chamber is considered a dive. Various options for hypebaric transportation and treatment exist, each with its own characteristics, applications and operational procedures.

- Closed bell – Hyperbaric chamber for transporting divers vertically through the water
- Hyperbaric evacuation system – Equipment for emergency transport of divers under pressure to a place of safety
- Hyperbaric lifeboat – Lifeboat for transporting people under pressure
- Hyperbaric stretcher – Portable pressure vessel to transport a person under pressure
- In-water recompression – In-water treatment for decompression sickness
- Recompression chamber – A hyperbaric chamber used to treat divers suffering from decompression illness
- Transfer under pressure – Moving between pressurised vessels without decompression

== Environments by confinement ==
Confinement can influence diver safety and the ability of the diver to perform the required task. Some types of confinement improve safety by limiting the ability of the diver to move into higher risk areas, others limit the ability of the diver to maneuver or to escape to a place of safety in an emergency.

- Confined space – Space with limited entry and egress and not suitable for human inhabitants
- Confined water – A diving environment that is enclosed and bounded sufficiently for safe training. The Queensland government define confined water for recreational diving purposes as "Water which offers pool-like conditions, good visibility, and water which is shallow enough so that all divers can stand up with their heads well clear of the water". Other definitions do not require such shallow depth, but may have a depth restriction.
- Open water – Unrestricted water with free vertical access to the surface
  - Blue-water diving – Diving in mid-water where the bottom is out of sight
  - Black-water diving – Open ocean mid-water diving at night
- Penetration diving, also known as overhead environments – Diving under a physical barrier to a direct vertical ascent to the surface
  - Cave diving – Diving in water-filled caves
  - Cavern diving – Diving in the part of a cave where the exit is visible by natural light
  - Culvert – Structure to channel water past an obstacle
  - Ice diving – Underwater diving under ice
  - Intake – Opening or structure through which a fluid is admitted into a space or machine
    - Penstock – Intake structure for turbines or sewerage systems
  - Overhang – Type of rock formation – A topographical feature which is open to one side, but obstructed overhead, and deep enough for a diver to be under the overhang.
  - Restriction – Space through which it is possible to pass with some difficulty – A minor restriction is too small for two divers to swim through together, a major restriction requires the diver to remove equipment to fit through.
  - Sewerage – Infrastructure that conveys sewage or surface runoff using sewers
  - Swim-through – Short underwater tunnel with adequate clearance and obvious exit – Arch, or short, clear tunnel that has sufficient space to allow a diver to swim through and where the light of the opening at the far end is visible through the hole.
  - Under ships – usually for inspection, maintenance and repair, or incidentally, when diving from one. In some cases the gap between the ship and the bottom or the jetty or dock can be quite small.
  - Wreck diving – Recreational diving on wrecks

== Environments by visibility ==
Visibility in the diving medium directly affects diver safety and the ability to complete useful tasks. In some cases this can be mitigated by technology to improve visibility, but often the task procedures must be modified to suit the capacity of the diver, and the diver must have training and equipment bto deal with emergencies under more difficult circumstances.

- Blue-water diving – Diving in mid-water where the bottom is out of sight
- Low visibility diving – Diving in a turbud diving medium
  - Silt out – Reduction of underwater visibility by disturbing silt deposits
- Night diving – Underwater diving during the hours of darkness
  - Black-water diving – Open ocean mid-water diving at night

== Environments by hazard ==
Besides the hazards associated with the underwater environment itself, there are a considerable variety of hazard types and risk levels to which a diver may be exposed due to the circumstances of the dive task. Many of these are normally only encountered by professional specialists, and the means of reducing risk to an acceptable level may be complex and expensive.

- Benign water – Diving environment with very low risk
- Bomb disposal – Activity to dispose of and render safe explosive munitions and other materials
- Clearance diving – Military diving work involving underwater demolition and work with explosives
- Combat diving – Tactical military scuba diving
- Currents – Water flow in a locally consistent direction
  - Drift diving – Scuba diving where the diver is intentionally transported by the water flow
  - Tidal current – Flow of water induced by astronomical gravitational effects
  - River diving
  - Turbulence – Motion characterized by chaotic changes in pressure and flow velocity
    - Overfall – Dangerously steep and breaking seas due to currents over shallow obstructions
    - Whirlpool – Body of rotating water produced by the meeting of opposing currents
- Wind wave – Surface waves generated by wind on open water
  - Swell (ocean) – Series of waves generated by distant weather systems
    - Breaking wave – Unstable wave
    - Wave surge, also known as shallow water wave motion – Horizontal component of wave motion.
- Delta P environments – Hazards associated with underwater diving – Environments where a pressure difference causes flow. Usually refers to cases where the flow is likely to entrain and pull the diver into an enclosed space or moving machinery.
  - Intakes from the body of water – Opening or structure through which a fluid is admitted into a space or machine
  - Outlets
    - Storm drain – Infrastructure for draining excess rain and ground water from impervious surfaces
    - Penstock – Intake structure for turbines or sewerage systems
    - Sluice gate – A movable gate allowing water to flow under it when opened
- Hazmat diving – Underwater diving in a known hazardous materials environment
  - Contaminated water – Water containing high levels of hazardous materials
  - Nuclear diving – Diving in an environment where there is a risk of exposure to radioactive materials
  - Sewer diving – Diving for maintenance work in sewers
- Lifting bag – Airtight bag used for underwater buoyant lifting when filled with air
- Live-boat diving, also known as liveboat diving or live-boating – Diving from a boat which is under way (not moored) – Diving from a vessel which may have propellers or thrusters in gear during the dive.
- Outfall – Discharge point of a drain or waste stream into a body of water
- Penetration diving, also known as Overhead diving – Diving under a physical barrier to a direct vertical ascent to the surface
- Underwater construction – Industrial construction in an underwater environment
- Underwater demolition – Deliberate destruction of underwater obstacles

== Environments by temperature ==
The temperature of the diving environment can influence the equipment used by the diver, and the time the diver can be exposed to the environment without excessive risk.

- Diving in hot water – Diving in conditions where active cooling is necessary
- Diving in warm water – Diving in conditions where no thermal protection is needed
- Diving in cold water, also known as cold water diving – Diving in water where heat loss is a serious problem – Water where heat loss is a critical hazard. Arbitrarily specified at below 10 °C for some training standards
- Diving in freezing water, also known as ice diving – Diving in water temperatures near freezing point – Water where surface layers are at or very near freezing point.

== Environments by geography ==
The geographical location of a dive site can have legal or environmental consequences.

- Tropical diving – Diving in tropical waters
- Temperate water diving – Diving in temperate waters
- Polar diving - Diving in polar waters
- Altitude diving – Underwater diving at altitudes above 300 m
- Cave diving – Diving in water-filled caves
- Drift diving – Scuba diving where the diver is intentionally transported by the water flow
- Inland diving – Diving in waters inland of the coastal high water mark.
- Reef diving – Recreational diving on a reef
  - Artificial reef – Human-made underwater structure that functions as a reef
  - Coral reef – Outcrop of rock in the sea formed by the growth and deposit of stony coral skeletons
  - Rocky reef – Natural reef of rock
- Inshore diving – Diving in coastal territorial waters
- Offshore diving – Diving outside the territorial waters of a country
- Open ocean diving – Diving in deep water out of sight of land

== Environments by topography ==
- Blue-water diving – Diving in mid-water where the bottom is out of sight
- Cave – Natural void under a planetary surface. See also Cave diving
  - Sump (cave) – Passage in a cave that is submerged under water
- Culvert – Structure to channel water past an obstacle
- Dam – Barrier that stops or restricts the flow of surface or underground streams
- Deep diving – Underwater diving to a depth beyond the norm accepted by the associated community
- Flooded mine – Excavation for mineral extraction filled by water
- Flooded quarries – Disused and flooded quarry repurposed for underwater diving
- Ice diving – Underwater diving under ice
- Lake – Large inland body of relatively still water
- Mid-water – At a depth away from surface and bottom
- Muck diving – Recreational diving on a loose sedimentary bottom
- Reef – Submerged ridge of rock, coral or other material
  - Artificial reef – Human-made underwater structure that functions as a reef
  - Coral reef – Outcrop of rock in the sea formed by the growth and deposit of stony coral skeletons
  - Rocky reef – Natural reef of rock
  - Pinnacle (diving) – Distinct high point on a reef
- River – Natural flowing freshwater stream
- Reservoir – Storage space for water
  - Water tank – Container for storing water
- Tunnel – Underground passage made for traffic
- Wall diving – Underwater diving alongside a near vertical face

== Environments by depth zone ==
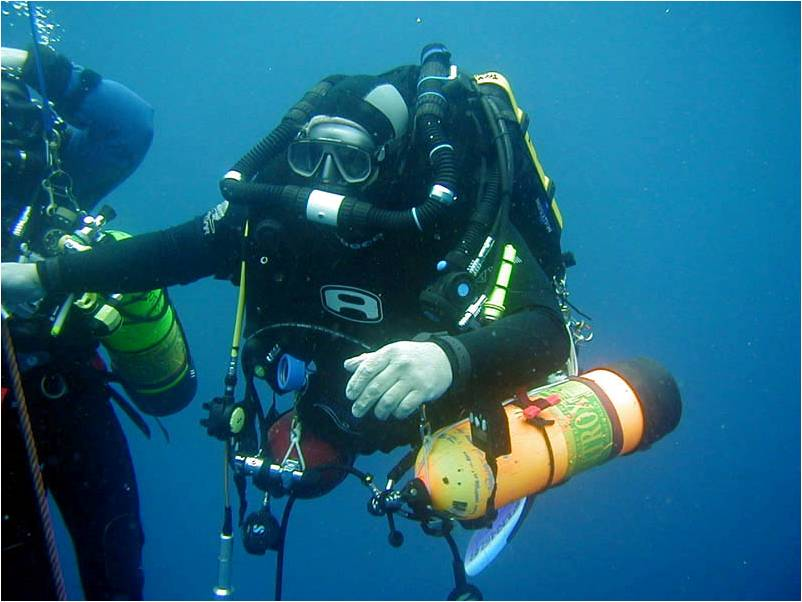
A technical diver using a closed circuit rebreather with open circuit bailout cylinders returns from a 600-foot (180 m) dive.

The recreational diving depth limit set by the EN 14153-2 / ISO 24801-2 level 2 "Autonomous Diver " standard is 20 metres (66 ft). This is the depth to which a diver is assumed competent to dive in terms of the standard. The recommended depth limit for more extensively trained recreational divers ranges from 30 metres (98 ft) for PADI divers, (this is the depth at which nitrogen narcosis symptoms generally begin to be noticeable in adults), to 40 metres (130 ft) specified by Recreational Scuba Training Council, 50 metres (160 ft) for divers of the British Sub-Aqua Club and Sub-Aqua Association breathing air, and 60 metres (200 ft) for teams of 2 to 3 French Level 3 recreational divers, breathing air.

For technical divers, the recommended maximum depths are greater on the understanding that they will use less narcotic gas mixtures. 100 metres (330 ft) is the maximum depth authorised for divers who have completed Trimix Diver certification with IANTD or Advanced Trimix Diver certification with TDI. 332 metres (1,089 ft) is the world record depth on scuba (2014). Commercial divers using saturation techniques and heliox breathing gases routinely exceed 100 metres (330 ft), but they are also limited by physiological constraints. Comex Hydra 8 experimental dives reached a record open water depth of 534 metres (1,752 ft) in 1988. Atmospheric pressure diving suits are mainly constrained by the technology of the articulation seals, and a US Navy diver has dived to 610 metres (2,000 ft) in one.

From an oceanographic viewpoint:

- Shallow water, defined as between the surf zone and the coast
- Intermediate water, defined as between the surf zone and wave base (where the waves just interact with the bottom and no more, about 80 metres (260 ft) water depth with 10 second swells). The seafloor beneath intermediate water is termed the shoreface and is the zone where the seafloor slows down the swells by friction, so that the surf ends up being lower than it otherwise would be.
- Deep water, defined as deeper than wave base: i.e. too deep for wind waves to interact with the seafloor.

Recreational divers will usually dive in the intermediate marine environment. Technical and commercial divers may venture into the deep water environment. The surf zone is usually too turbulent for safe or effective diving.

== Environments by professional activity ==
- Aquaculture – Farming of aquatic organisms
- Aquarium – Transparent tank of water for fish and water-dwelling species
- Archaeological sites – Place in which evidence of past activity is preserved
- Clearance diving – Military diving work involving underwater demolition and work with explosives
- Deep sea mining, also known as Underwater mining – Mineral extraction from the ocean floor
- Demolition – Tearing down of buildings and other structures
- Dry dock – Basin drained to allow work on a vessel
- Fish farms – Raising fish commercially in enclosures
- Forensic investigation – Application of scientific investigation to criminal and civil laws
- Inspection – Organized examination or formal evaluation exercise
- Marine salvage – Recovering a ship or cargo after a maritime casualty
- Military – Organized force intended for warfare
- Mooring – Structure for securing floating vessels
  - Single buoy mooring, also known as Single point mooring – Offshore mooring buoy with connections for loading or unloading tankers
- Nuclear power plant – Thermal power station where the heat source is a nuclear reactor
- Oil rig – Apparatus constructed for oil drilling
  - Oil platform, also known as Production platform – Offshore ocean structure with oil drilling and related facilities
- Public safety diving – Underwater work done by law enforcement, rescue and search and recovery teams
- Science – Systematic endeavour to gain knowledge
- Search and rescue – Search for and provision of aid to people who are in distress or imminent danger
- Sewage treatment – Process of removing contaminants from municipal wastewater
- Ships husbandry – Maintenance and upkeep of ships
- Submarine pipeline – Pipeline that is laid on the seabed or below it inside a trench
- Surveying – Science of determining the positions of points and the distances and angles between them
- Training – Acquisition of knowledge, skills, and competencies as a result of teaching or practice
- Underwater construction, also known as Civil engineering – Industrial construction in an underwater environment
- Wellhead – Component at the surface of a well

== Diving medium ==
- Underwater environment – Aquatic or submarine environment
  - Fresh water – Naturally occurring water with low amounts of dissolved salts
    - Potable water – Water safe for consumption
  - Brackish water – Water with salinity between freshwater and seawater
  - Seawater – Water from a sea or an ocean
  - Brine – Concentrated solution of salt in water
  - Contaminated water – Water containing high levels of hazardous materials
    - Sewage – Wastewater that is produced by a community of people
- Drilling fluid, also known as drilling mud – Aid for drilling boreholes into the ground
- Petroleum, also known as crude oil – Naturally occurring combustible liquid
- Fuel oil – Petroleum product burned to generate motive power or heat
