= Marker buoy =

Marker buoy may refer to:

- Surface marker buoy used by divers
- A floating sea mark
- A light- or smoke-emitting buoy used in naval warfare
