= Wall diving =

Underwater diving alongside a near vertical face

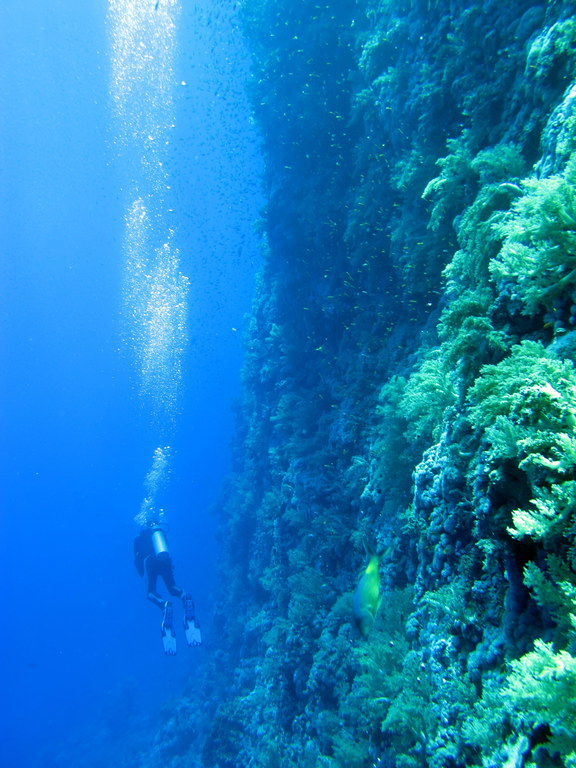
Wall dive

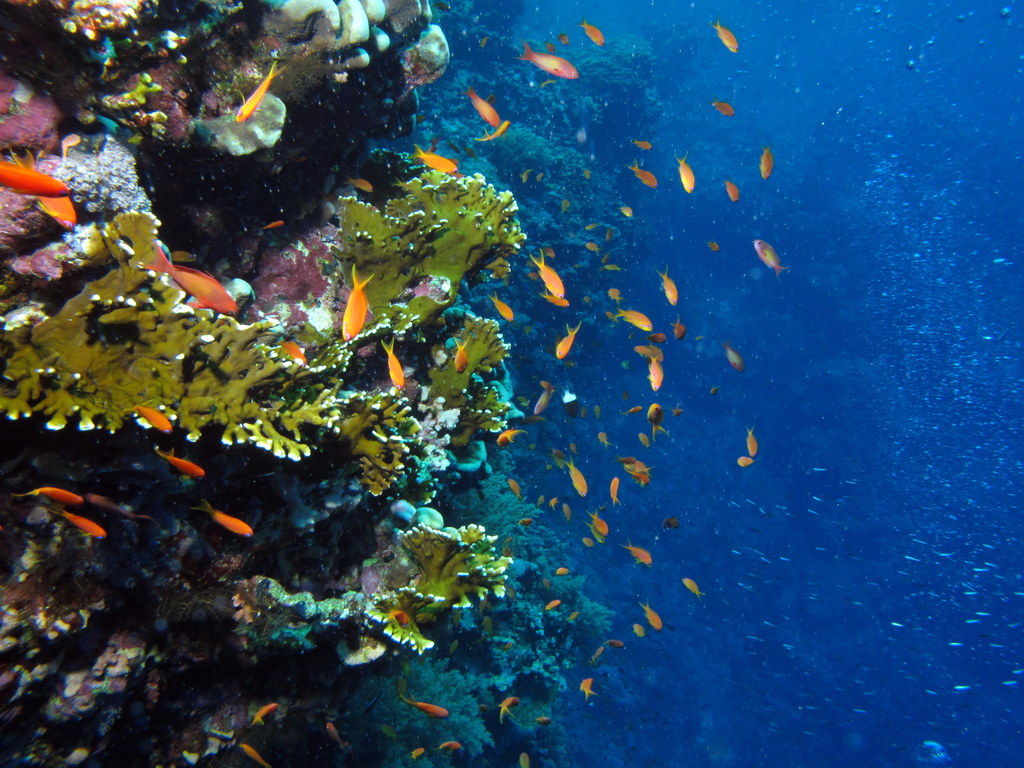
Wall with fire coral and goldies

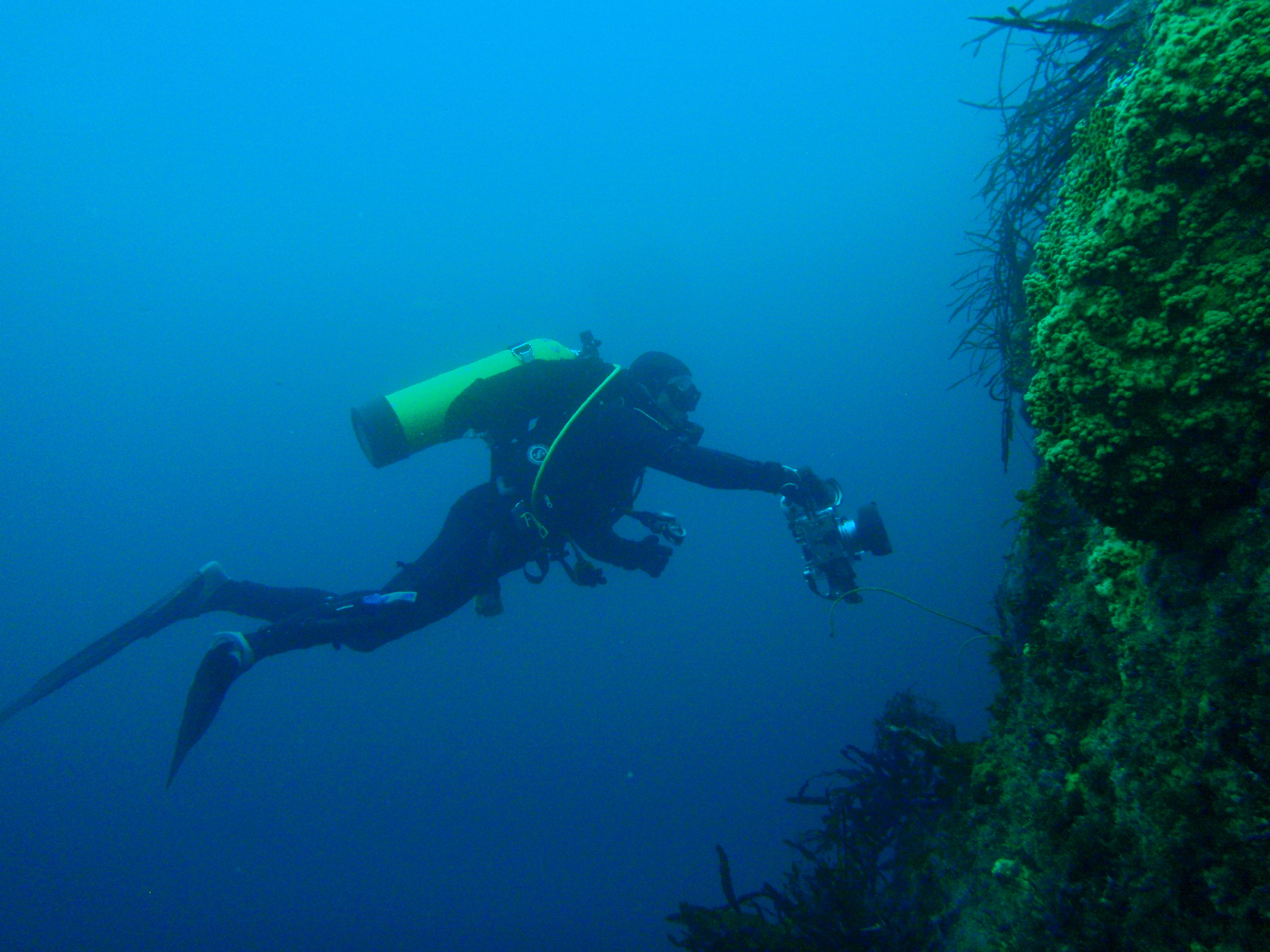
Scientific diver on the wall at The Sisters, Tasman peninsula, on a Reef Life Survey dive.

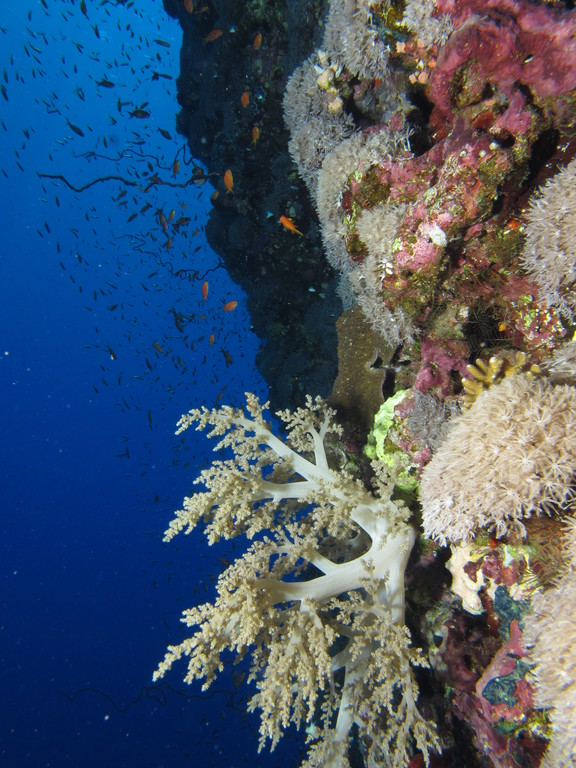
A vertical wall at Daedalus Reef, Red Sea, Egypt

Wall diving is underwater diving alongside a near vertical face, usually an underwater cliff. It is a type of reef diving popular among recreational divers for the biodiversity of the benthic community on the one side with a pelagic community on the other, and useful in scientific diving when assessing biodiversity of a region. Wall dive sites vary considerably in depth, and many are suitable for drift diving when a moderate current flows along the wall. The context is usually recreational diving, technical diving, or scientific diving on scuba. No special training is required, but this environment requires good buoyancy control skills for safety.

== Environment ==
The main characteristic of wall diving sites is that the terrain is predominantly near vertical. The height of the wall can vary from a few metres to hundreds of metres. The top of the wall must be within diving depth, or above the water, but the bottom may be far below or reasonably close to the surface. Many wall dive sites are in close proximity to more gently sloping reefs and unconsolidated sediment bottoms.

Visibility may be anything from very good to very bad, and there may be currents along the wall in almost any direction, sometimes with strong turbulence, vortices and overfalls. This can be a very challenging diving environment.

By their nature, there is a reliable fixed visible reference for vertical position and movement monitoring along a wall if there is any visibility.

=== Topography ===
Wall diving is diving along vertical or near vertical sided of coral reefs, or rocky cliffs, or other near vertical underwater terrain. The wall face may be fairly short, or may continue for kilometres, and may be interrupted by ledges, less steep areas, or overhangs, or may be almost continuously vertical. The bottom may or may not be visible from diveable depths.

The wall face may be anything from a relatively smooth face, at a steep slope, through vertical to a moderate overhang, and may be a single cliff face, or stepped, or have overhangs, caves, ledges, gullies, and cracks. Walls can vary from a few metres high on part of a reef to faces that drop down for hundreds of meters. Rugosity may be high or low. Depending on the geology, the wall face may be relatively smooth, blocky, or riddled with overhangs, caves, crevices, and tunnels. Lava faces and coral reefs tend to be more varied in texture. Karst shorelines tend to have larger caves. In plan it can be anything from nearly straight to highly convoluted, with gullies, curves, sudden changes of direction, transverse canyons, and offshore stacks. A wall may be a few tens of metres long or may extend for several kilometres. The structure of the wall face can be virtually any kind of sufficiently durable rock, or coral reef, and artificial structures such as dam walls, breakwaters, harbour walls, and offshore platforms may also be considered walls for recreational diving.

Walls may be the continuation of a steep rocky cliff shoreline, or may be a considerable distance offshore, both of which may be difficult to access from the shore. In other cases, an easy beach entry with a short swim may provide access to the top of a reef edge drop-off starting near the surface. In some places the terrestrial terrain may suggest the presence of underwater cliffs, and in other areas the land may be flat and low-lying, with fringing coral reefs with steep and deep dropoffs. Most wall dives are in the sea, but others can be found in fresh water in flooded quarries and in sinkholes.

=== Ecology ===
Walls generally have relatively high biodiversity compared with other sites in the same region. This is partly due to the large range of depths, but is also influenced by the rugosity.

The basic ecology depends on the geographical location, and is usually very similar to that of the local reefs. It is also affected by the water flow and detailed topography, and by the depth range. Biodiversity tends to be higher where there are a wider range of habitats concentrated in a region, and this is generally true for walls, though they may lack organisms that prefer a more horizontal substrate, and those easily dislodged which may fall to relatively inhospitable depths.

Local biodiversity may be higher than average for the region due to wide depth range and variety of habitats. Both pelagic and benthic organisms may be present. Much of the marine benthic life will usually be relatively delicate and sensitive to impact by divers and their equipment, making it undesirable to use the wall face as place to hold onto for position and depth control, though some divers routinely use reef hooks for this purpose.

== Hazards ==
The most characteristic hazard of wall diving is that a lack of a depth-limiting bottom within the operational depth range may allow a diver to exceed planned depth, but this is not always a problem.

Currents may follow the face of the wall both horizontally or vertically, in upwellings and downwellings, and there can be strong vortices and turbulence at sharp changes in direction, and overfalls at the top. Such currents may be stable, or variable and relatively unpredictable. Large swells can make the top edge untenable if they cross the top edge, as this can generate strong turbulence and rapidly changing local up- and down-wellings. Up- and downwellings are often isolated and may be restricted to known locations and specific sea conditions, so it may be possible to avoid them much of the time. Lateral currents may be stronger further away from the wall, or near the wall around projections and sharp convex changes in direction across the current flow. Local variations in wall topography may provide shelter from currents or areas of increased turbulence which can sometimes be visually recognised by movements of benthic organisms, like sea fans or seaweeds, with the flow, or occasionally by the predominance of organisms that are suited to strong flow or turbulence

A further hazard for divers towing a surface marker buoy is getting the buoy snagged on a shallow obstacle while the diver is in a strong current, as the combination of flow and restraint at the end of the line can cause a diver to swing upward rapidly, which can violate recommended ascent rate and present a risk of decompression illness.

As the dive is generally conducted close to the wall, and there may be overhangs or projecting organisms which can foul a surface marker buoy or decompression buoy line, it may be necessary to do drift dives without a marker to identify the position of divers to the boat, as a snagged line in a current can cause great difficulty to control depth, and can damage fragile organisms living on the wall.

== Skills ==
The most universal specific skill requirement is good buoyancy control, which is needed to avoid excessive depth and rapid depth changes in either direction, particularly in the presence of turbulence and vertical flow. Good buoyancy control is facilitated by optimum weighting for the equipment used. In general, wall diving does not require any specialist skills beyond those normally needed for the dive profile planned and the equipment used. No special training or certification is needed, though it is available from agencies which have a marketing strategy of providing minimum training per certification and a wide range of specialised but limited courses.

Some shallower walls and walls with a less vertical slope or many ledges may be suitable for less skilled divers, if the currents are mild and there are no vertical currents or strong turbulence at the wall edge, but generally, good buoyancy and depth control skills and management are necessary for safe diving. At the end of a dive it may be prudent to move away from the wall before deploying a decompression buoy, to make sure it clears the reef, and this requires deployment in midwater, and depth control is more complex while inflating the float. Many wall dive sites are relatively deep, and nitrox or trimix certification may be required.

== Procedures ==
Recreational diving profiles planned on walls tend to start deep and gradually ascend along the wall, preferably surfacing where the depth of the top of the wall is shallow if the water movement allows, as this will usually maximise the no-stop limit, or minimise the decompression obligation for a given bottom time and breathing gas mixture.

Some walls allow groups with mixed skill levels to dive at the same site, with novices remaining in the shallows and more competent and adventurous divers with suitable equipment and skills exploring the deeper parts, while still having an interesting ascent and decompression environment. The common recreational dive plan is to start deep and ascend slowly and relatively continuously, so that there is no major decompression obligation at the end of the dive. Scientific divers may use a similar general strategy, but will plan around the dive task, which may require a different profile.

It may be difficult to set up a shot-line conveniently near the wall face, depending on depth and water movement, and it may not be possible to moor a dive boat close enough to the wall to be useful as an ascent location. A wall is often a suitable venue for drift diving, depending on current strength and direction. The presence of the wall face is useful as a vertical reference, which may help in monitoring depth if there is not much current. Vertical areas and overhangs may make towed surface markers difficult or impossible to manage, depending on current strength and direction, wind, and wave motion, and a dive leader towing a surface marker buoy may have to stay far enough from the wall to avoid getting the line snagged on a shallower part of the wall. Decompression buoys deployed at a suitable point during ascent can be useful, even when no stops are required, for effective control of ascent rate and as a signal to boat traffic indicating the position of the divers, and that they are ascending. Negative buoyancy descent down a wall face requires divers to be able to stop descending at their planned depth, which usually requires achieving neutral buoyancy by buoyancy compensator and dry suit inflation in time to stop.

=== Environmental impact ===
As in the case of flatter reefs, much of the damage done by divers is by fin strikes, but the finning techniques likely to minimise impact may differ. The frog kick which helps avoid contact and disturbance below the diver is less relevant where there is no reef to impact below the diver, and a vertical or steeply inclined trim does not put the fins close to the bottom. Frog kick can increase the risk of fin strike when swimming parallel to the wall at close range, while flutter kick should normally propel the diver parallel to the reef with a relatively low risk of fin strike.

The other common form of diver contact with the wall surface is holding on to control motion due to sudden or unexpected changes in water flow. Damage depends on what the diver holds onto, and how it is done. Benthic organisms vary considerably in sensitivity to this kind of contact, but unlike fin strike, the diver may have a choice of what to hold, though in strong turbulence this may no be the case.

== Equipment ==
Most wall diving is for recreational and scientific purposes, using scuba equipment. Choice of diving equipment depends on the topography, water conditions, and hazards of the specific site, and the planned dive profile, particularly maximum depth and planned staged decompression. The main difference between wall and other forms of reef diving is that there may not be a bottom limiting the dive depth, Otherwise, the equipment is generally the same as for other open water diving in similar conditions. Decompression buoys are a relatively common choice in the open sea, for signalling position and for depth control during ascent. The dive computer or depth gauge should be carried where it can easily and frequently be checked. An audible depth alarm can be useful. Good weighting and weight distribution allowing the diver to trim as suits the situation and which minimises the volume of gas necessary in the buoyancy compensator will facilitate maintaining neutral buoyancy, which may require more attention on wall dives.

Good buoyancy control requires both suitable skill and suitable equipment. When decompression is planned, it is critical to diver safety to be able to ascend at a controlled rate and remain at suitable depths for decompression, so a decompression buoy serves both as a marker identifying the location of the diver, and a means of easily maintaining a stable depth for decompression when above the top of the wall, and can be deployed at the end of the dive when there is less risk of fouling on the wall above the diver. A decompression buoy also gives the diver more options if they have a problem with buoyancy of a dry suit or buoyancy compensator. Other equipment often recommended includes a light for looking into crevices, overhangs and caves.

== Location ==
Walls suitable for diving are usually relatively close to the shore, and in some cases are a continuation of a shoreline cliff face. Most wall dive sites are in the sea, but they can also be found inland in sinkholes, caves, flooded quarries, and flooded mines.

=== Wall diving regions ===
Specific regions known for wall dive sites include the Cayman Islands, Palau, Indonesia, Papua New Guinea, Turks & Caicos, Bahamas, Honduras, Belize, Hawaii, Red Sea, Fiji, and others, including many outside the tropics. Inshore dive sites in North America with vertical rock faces include Puget Sound in Washington, Monterey Bay, and Catalina Island in California. Galapagos Islands in Ecuador, Raja Ampat in Indonesia, the Maldives, Cozumel, and the Similan Islands National Park in Thailand are also known for wall dives.
