= Diver down flag =

Flag signal indicating divers are in the water nearby

The "Alpha" or "Alfa" flag (left) and red-and-white flag (right), both meaning "I have a diver down; keep well clear at slow speed"

A diver down flag, or scuba flag, is a flag used on the water to indicate that there is a diver below. Two styles of flag are in use. Internationally, the code flag alfa/alpha, which is white and blue, is used to signal that the vessel has a diver down and other vessels should keep well clear at slow speed. In North America it is conventionally red with a white stripe from the upper left corner to the lower right corner.

== Purpose ==
The purpose of the flags is to notify to any other boats to steer clear for the safety of the diver and to avert the possibility of a collision with the dive boat which may be unable to maneuver out of the way.

== Signal flag Alpha ==
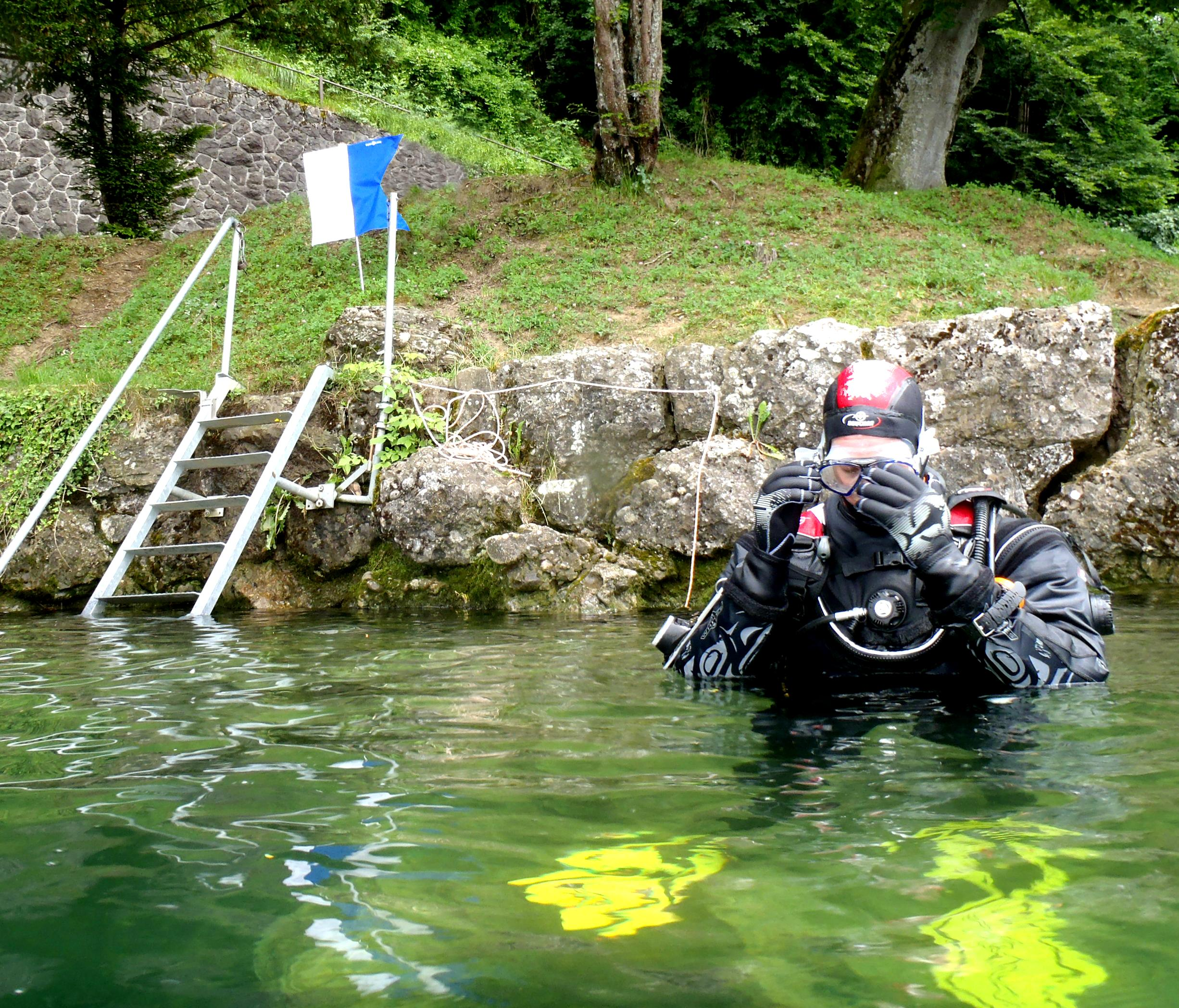
A diver getting ready to dive in front of an alpha flag.

As a code signal the International maritime signal flag Alpha (or "Alfa", signifying the letter "A") has the meaning of "I have a diver down; keep well clear at slow speed", used to indicate that the vessel has limited maneuverability, and the presence of a diver in the water around the boat. It is used alone in all countries excluding the United States, Canada and sometimes in Italy, but may be used along with the red and white flag, and sometimes the red and white crossed (St Andrews). In the diving culture sphere of influence such as certain countries within the Caribbean, Australia and North America, it may not be used, and completely replaced with the red and white flag on a buoy or on the boat. Note that the NATO divers uses the St Andrews cross.

A rigid replica of the 'Alpha' flag is required to be displayed by any vessel engaged in diving operations when restricted in her ability to maneuver, if the size of the vessel makes it impractical to display the shapes and lights required by the International Regulations for Preventing Collisions at Sea (IRPCS) Rule 27.

== The red and white flag ==
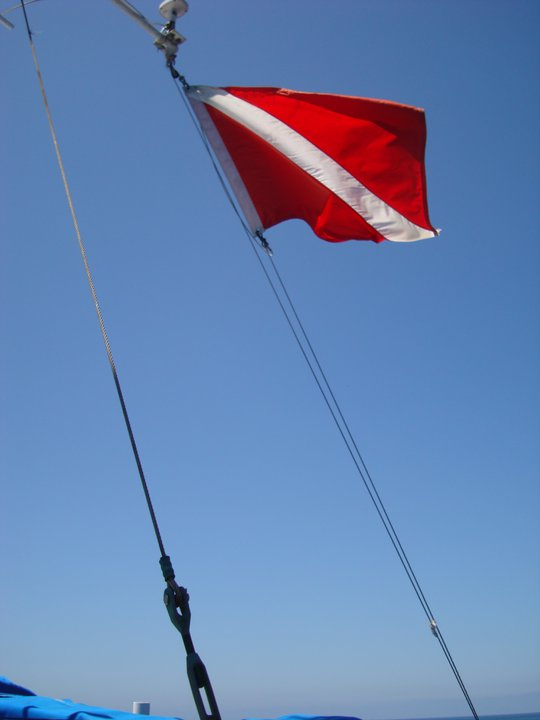
Diver down flag being flown on a dive ship

The use of the red and white flag, which was created in the early 1950s by Navy veteran Denzel James "Doc" Dockery of Michigan, and popularized by Ted Nixon of US Divers, is required by law or regulation in many US states, Canada, and some other countries (e.g. Italy). Usually the regulations require divers to display the flag while diving and to stay within a specified area when they are near the surface. There may also be a larger zone around the flag where no boats are allowed to pass. Some states also prohibit the display of this flag when there is no diver in water. It can be placed on a boat or on a surface marker buoy.

== Other uses ==
Today the red and white flag is so strictly associated with scuba diving in North America that it is also used to indicate a place where there are services for divers, for example stores selling or renting diving equipment or scuba service stations. It may be seen on the windows or bumpers of cars belonging to divers.

Elongated variant of the Diver down flag

Code flag alfa/alpha also represents the letter 'A' in signalling.

Rock band Van Halen used the red and white flag as the cover art of their 1982 album Diver Down.
