= Night diving =

Underwater diving during the hours of darkness

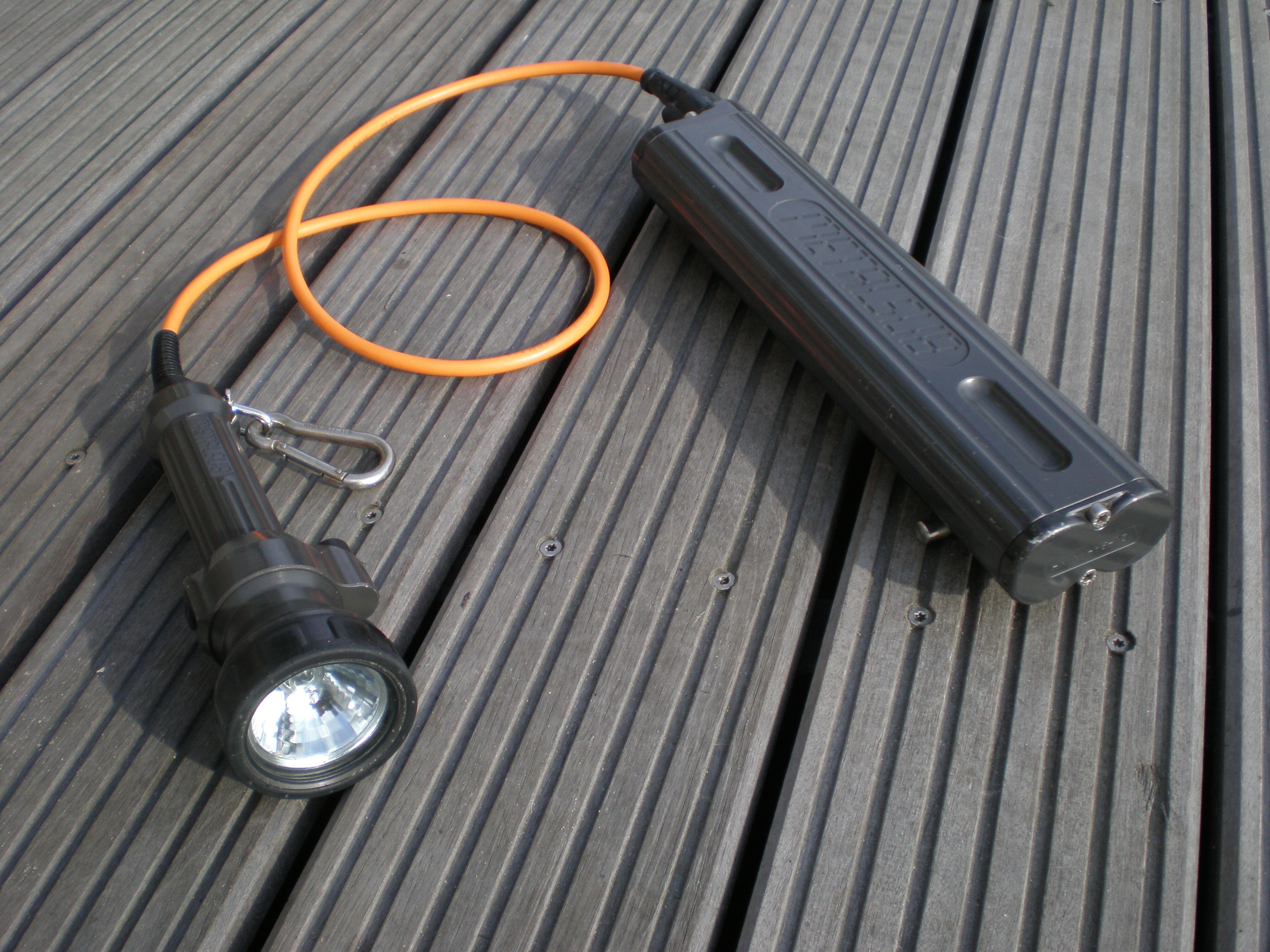
A canister style dive light

Night diving is underwater diving done during the hours of darkness. It frequently refers specifically to recreational diving which takes place in darkness. The diver can experience a different underwater environment at night, because many marine animals are nocturnal.

There are additional hazards when diving in darkness, such as dive light failure. This can result in losing vertical visual references and being unable to control depth or buoyancy, being unable to read instruments such as dive computers and diving cylinder contents gauges, and potential separation from the rest of the diving group, boat, or shore cover. Even with a functioning light, these hazards are still present in night diving. Backup lights are recommended.

== Training and certification ==
Several diver certification agencies offer specialty training in night diving, and it was originally part of the training requirement for the second level of recreational diving (CMAS two-star scuba diver, etc.), but professional diver training will usually include it in entry-level training as it is considered a normal part of occupational diving.

== Equipment and procedures ==
Normal requirements for night diving are a dive light, and adequate protection from exposure. Some precautions and skills for night diving include: avoiding shining the light in other divers' eyes, to be aware of and use surface light signals for bearings, and if appropriate to use an illuminated shotline buoy. A surface marker buoy with an attached strobe light or cyalume stick can be used to indicate the position of the divers to the surface team. The use of a strobe light by a diver under water can damage the night vision of other divers, and would generally be reserved as an emergency signal. A backup light can be useful if the primary light fails, and is essential if doing a decompression dive without a dive computer which can be read in the dark.

There are several advantages to night diving at a site that is familiar from diving there during the day. The diver who is more familiar with the site is less likely to be disoriented.

Excessively strong lights can scare off or stress nocturnal animals and may make them more vulnerable to predation while regaining their vision. Similarly, divers will be dazzled by lights shone in their eyes, and will take some time to recover night vision, during which they will be less able to deal with contingencies. Dive light discipline is more difficult in larger groups.

Black-water diving is the night time equivalent of blue-water diving which is mid-water diving in deep open oceanic waters.

== Recovering divers ==
If a diver surfaces away from the boat, dive lights can be used to signal the dive boat. A surface marker buoy can be illuminated with a dive light at night to increase the visibility of the dive team to the boat. Reflective tape surfaces can also be used to increase visibility of the team on the surface.
