= Surface marker buoy =

Buoy towed by a scuba diver to indicate position

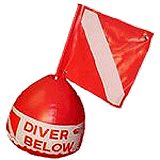
- Inflatable surface marker buoy
- Acronym: SMB, DSMB
- Other names: Delayed surface marker buoy; Decompression buoy; Deco buoy; Blob
- Uses: Marking the position of a group of divers; Marking the position of a diver making an ascent; Signal to the surface party that assistance may be needed

A surface marker buoy, SMB, dive float or simply a blob is a buoy used by scuba divers, at the end of a line from the diver, intended to indicate the diver's position to people at the surface while the diver is underwater. Two kinds are used; one (SMB) is towed for the whole dive, and indicates the position of the dive group throughout the dive, and the other, a delayed surface marker buoy, DSMB or decompression buoy, is deployed towards the end of the dive as a signal to the surface that the divers have started to ascend, and where they are going to surface. Both types can also function as a depth reference for controlling speed of ascent and accurately maintaining depth at decompression stops. Surface marker buoys are also used by freedivers in open water, to indicate the approximate position of the diver when submerged. They may also be used to support a catch bag or fish stringer by underwater hunters and collectors. A DSMB is considered by recreational scuba divers and service providers to be a highly important item of safety equipment, yet its use is not part of the entry level recreational diver training for all training agencies, and there are significant hazards associated with incompetent use.

A "safety sausage" or "signal tube" is a low volume tubular buoy inflated at or near the surface to increase visibility of the diver in the water. A DSMB can be put to this service when necessary. When used by a diver to indicate their position, any of these may be described as a personal marker buoy.

Another function for a buoy deployed by a diver is to mark the position of an underwater point of interest. In this use the buoy is attached to the target until the position has been recorded, or until the marking function is no longer required. A wider range of equipment is used for this function, including the same equipment that would normally be used for marking the position of the diver. A problem associated with this use is how to hold the buoy in position at the point of interest but still be able to retrieve it from the surface.

== Standard buoy ==
=== Primary function ===
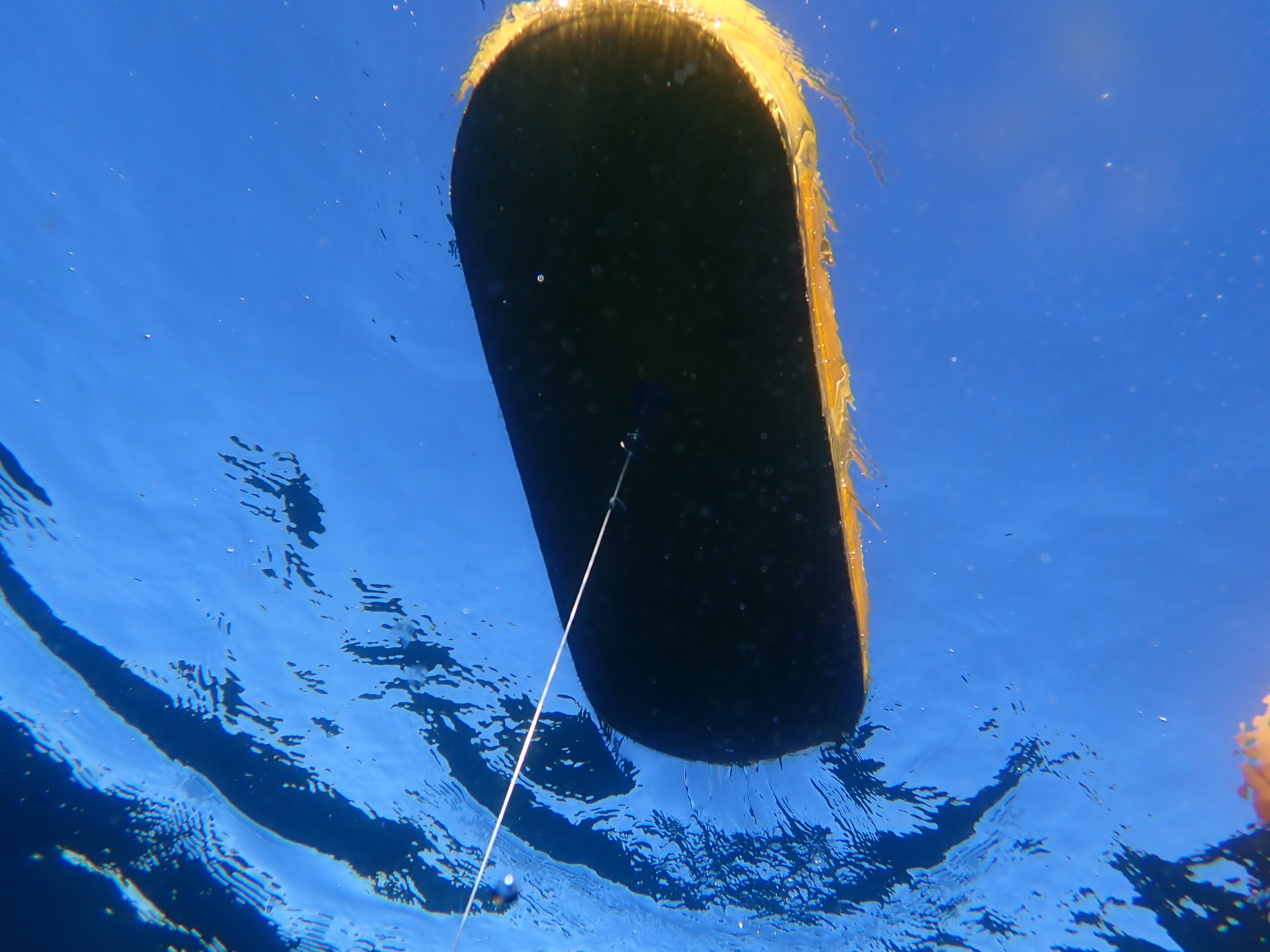
Surface marker buoy indicating the underwater position of a scuba diver

Surface marker buoys are floated on the surface during a dive to mark the diver's position during drift dives, night dives, mist or disturbed sea conditions such as Beaufort force 2 or greater. The buoy lets the dive boat follow the divers and highlights their position to other boat traffic which makes it easier to stay clear. In some waters divers may be required to use a float to mark their presence. The US Coast Guard has conducted a public education campaign to get divers to add identification information to their dive-floats, to help them identify and find lost divers, and so divers who lost their floats can advise the Coast Guard that, if found, their float should be regarded as a false alarm.

=== Other uses ===
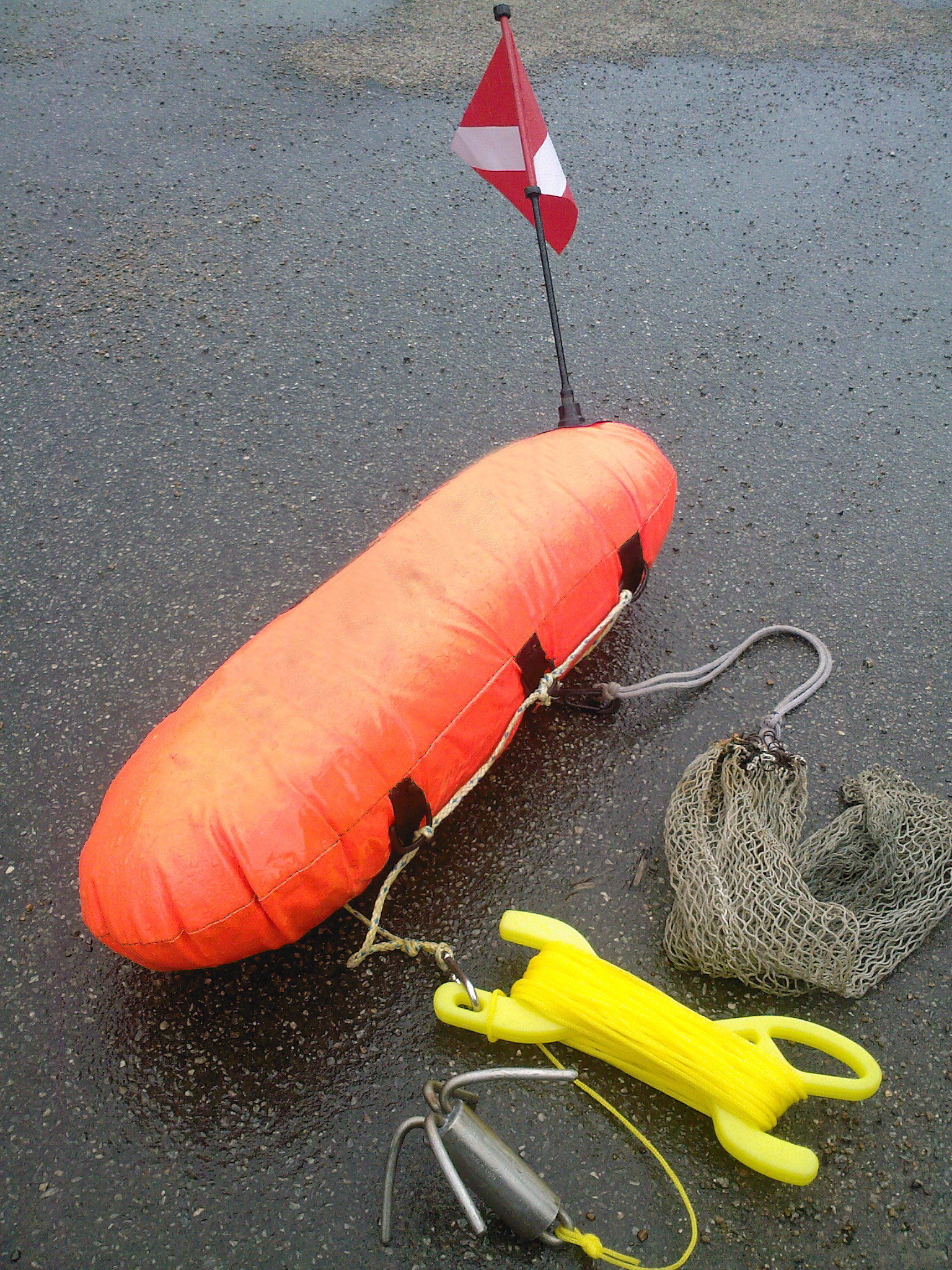
underwater hunting buoy with flag, line holder, catch bag line and grapnel for hooking to the bottom

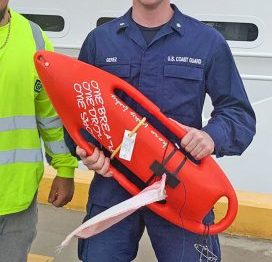
Identification on a dive-float can prevent unnecessary searches for divers presumed lost.

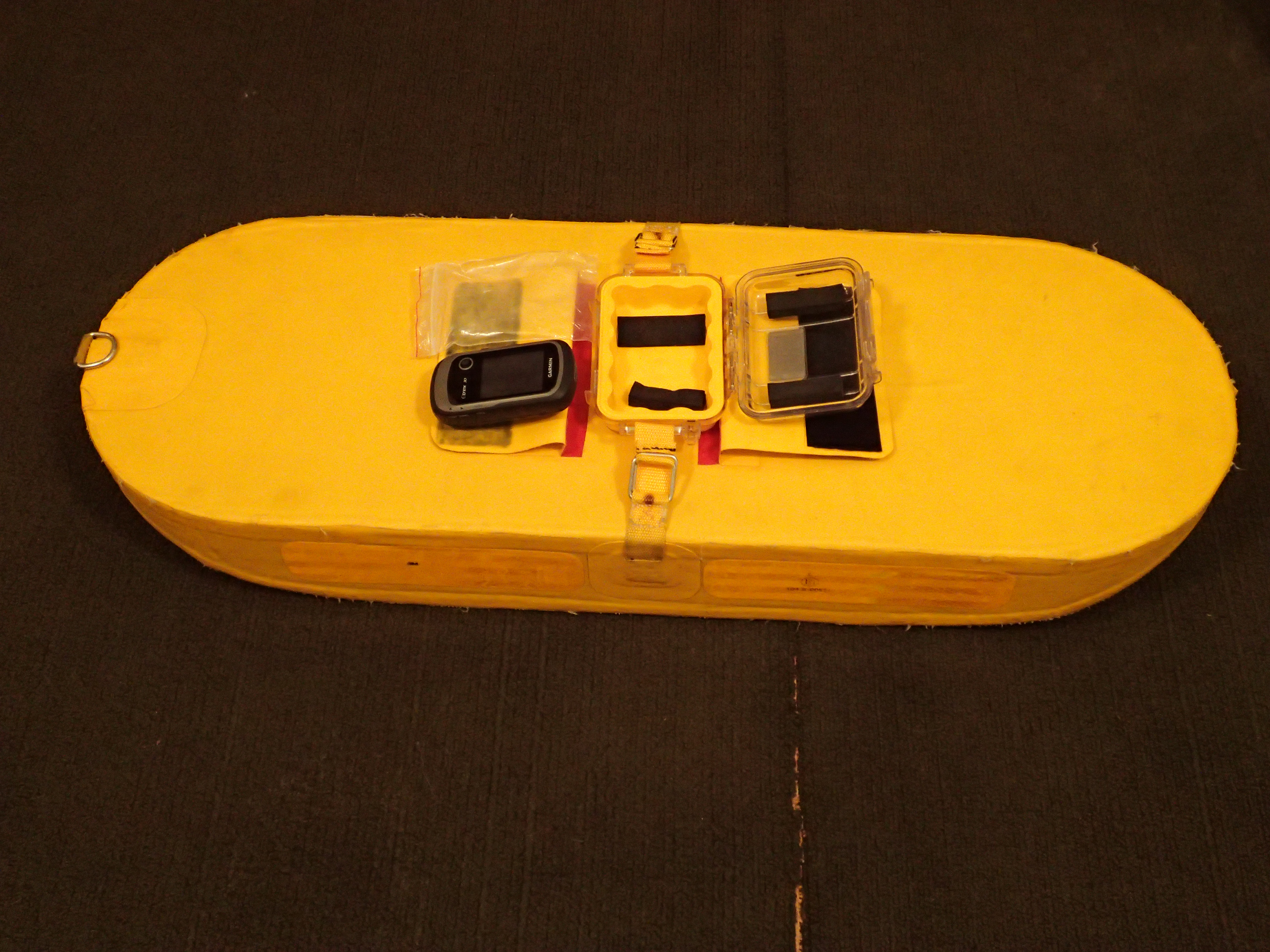
SMB towed with GPS receiver to record the track of the diver during a dive

Occasionally an SMB is used in conditions of poor visibility where there is a risk of inadvertently penetrating an overhead environment, to ensure that there is a guideline leading out of the overhead to the surface.

In an emergency where buoyancy control is lost due to a BCD leak, the SMB can be used to compensate for buoyancy loss to the extent of the buoyancy of the surfaced buoy. This may require considerably more effort to wind in the line, but finning upwards will help. The buoyancy of any SMB can be used to help maintain a constant depth at decompression stops, and the process of winding in the line can help maintain a steady ascent rate.

Competitors in the underwater sport underwater orienteering are required to tow a SMB with a buoyancy of at least 8 kilograms (18 lb) during competition swims. This is both for safety, and to allow the judges to monitor the route taken by the diver and to score the points for time and accuracy. Such SMBs are designed for low drag, which is a useful feature in any SMB that will be towed by the diver.

A GPS tracker can be mounted on the SMB to record a dive track. This can be downloaded and used to establish positions of underwater landmarks with reasonable accuracy depending on surface conditions and current. Position of a point of interest can be established by the timestamp on a photograph taken of the feature if the camera clock is synchronised with the GPS unit. The position will be most accurate when the buoy line is tensioned to float as close as possible to directly above the diver.

Spearfishers also use surface marker buoys to mark the position of the speargun in case it is necessary to let go after spearing a fish or for any other reason. These are towed on a line attached to the speargun handle. Similar buoys with catch bags are used by freedivers for other underwater hunting and gathering activities. They serve as a place to gather and transport the catch, and may be equipped with a means of hooking to the bottom to stop them drifting away while the diver is busy.

A surface marker buoy is considered an essential tool in the initial project phases for establishing a coral nursery, when exploratory dives are being conducted to find suitable sites for nurseries, donor sites and transplantation sites. The SMB is used to mark these areas until a GPS position can be recorded.

=== Construction ===
Buoys for this use are usually either inflated and sealed by a valve or cap, or made from buoyant material, so they cannot deflate or flood during the dive, rendering them ineffective. High-visibility colours such as red, orange and yellow are popular. Sometimes the float includes a small diving flag. If the buoy is to be towed by the diver at any speed, a low drag float and small diameter line can reduce the drag significantly. The torpedo buoys used by lifesavers are sometimes used as surface marker buoys as they are visible, tough, available, and reasonably low drag.

To avoid losing the reel, a lanyard may be used to attach the diving reel to the diver. This lanyard can clip to the buoyancy compensator or go around the wrist. If the lanyard clips to the buoyancy compensator, the user should take care to release it if there is surface boating activity, as boats may drag divers up by their SMB reels. The DIR diving philosophy considers unsafe any attachment of the diver to equipment or objects which end above the water surface in waters where boats may operate, due to high risk associated with snagging the object on a boat and dragging the diver upwards in spite of their decompression obligation or maximum ascent speed limit.

=== Hazards ===
- Although a primary function of a SMB is to notify boat users of the presence and location of divers in the water, it can happen that the buoy or line becomes snagged on a moving vessel. This will pull the line upwards, and if it is fastened to the diver, will pull the diver upwards, probably at an unsafe speed, putting the diver at moderate to severe risk of decompression illness.
- In areas where the variation of current with depth is strong, a diver being towed by an SMB may not be able to control their speed and direction of drift sufficiently to avoid being dragged against obstacles on the bottom, or to stay with other members of the group.
- In areas of high relief, the line may snag far above the diver. If the current is strong the diver may have to abandon the buoy to avoid being swept upwards in an arc.
- Loose line in the water is an entanglement hazard. A diver's equipment can snag on even a taut SMB line. In most cases this does not prevent the diver from surfacing, but it is possible to snag on both the diver and part of the fixed environment. Usually this can be cut loose if the diver has an appropriate cutting tool.

== Decompression buoy ==
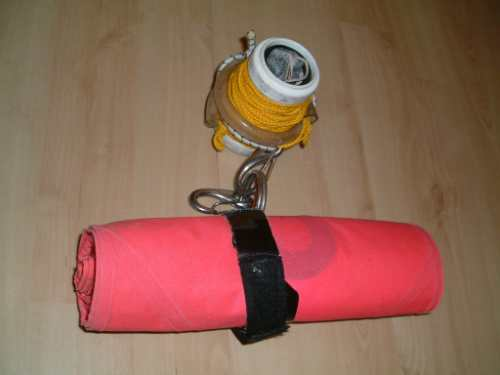
Packed DSMB

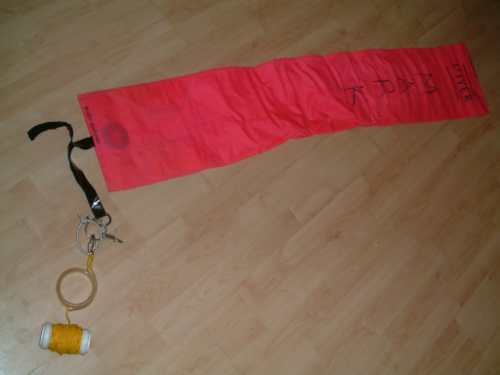
DSMB ready to be inflated

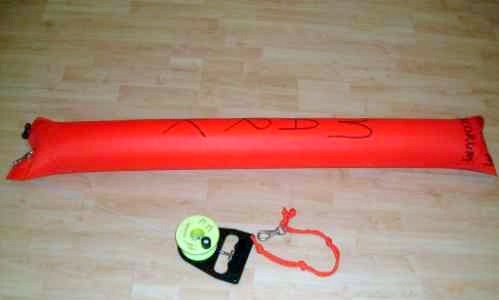
Inflated DSMB

A delayed surface marker buoy (DSMB), decompression buoy, or deco buoy is an inflatable buoy which can be deployed while the diver is submerged and generally only towards the end of the dive. The buoy marks the diver's position underwater so the dive boat crew can locate the diver even though the diver may have drifted some distance from the dive site while doing decompression stops. A reel and line connect the buoy on the surface to the diver beneath the surface. A DSMB can help the diver maintain accurate depth during a decompression stop, both as a visual depth reference, and as a buoyancy aid. When used as a buoyancy aid, a light tension is kept on the line by establishing a slight negative buoyancy for the diver which can easily be supported by the buoy. The tension in the line also keeps the buoy upright, making it more visible at a distance. Alternative means of marking and maintaining one's position while doing decompression stops are shot-lines, uplines and decompression trapezes.

A closed DSMB, inflated through a valve, is likely to be more reliable, by remaining inflated, than an open ended buoy which seals by holding the opening under water. A decompression buoy is not intended to be used to lift heavy weights: for this purpose divers use a lifting bag.

=== Shape and size ===
To serve effectively as a marker of the diver's position, a decompression buoy must be visible to the intended observers. This requires it to project above the surface as much as reasonably possible, and to have a sufficient projected lateral area above the water and a good contrast against the background. The shape which easily provides this functionality for an inflatable object is a tall cylinder or gently tapering cone. The preferred height depends on the expected sea conditions – in larger waves a taller buoy will be more visible, and for best visibility it should be close to upright, which requires a downward tension on the line in proportion to the height of the buoy. The lengths usually marketed range between 1 and 2 metres, with the larger models better suited to rougher open water and longer range visibility.

=== Volume ===
The volume is determined by the profile, as the buoys are circular in cross section. There should be sufficient volume for adequate visibility. A large volume can make the buoy difficult to deploy safely if the gas source is not carried by the buoy.

=== Air retention ===
There are at least four methods of keeping the air in the inflated decompression buoy. The buoy can be:

- open ended (preferably with a small weight built into the bottom end to keep the opening submerged to prevent the air escaping when the float is lying horizontal at the surface, which will happen whenever there is no tension on the line);
- open ended self-sealing buoys (the air in the buoy expands as the buoy ascends and is kept in by a flap valve neck at the bottom of the buoy);
- sealed, with an inflation valve and a pressure relief valve;
- sealed, with a small integral air supply cylinder and a pressure relief valve.

=== Colour ===
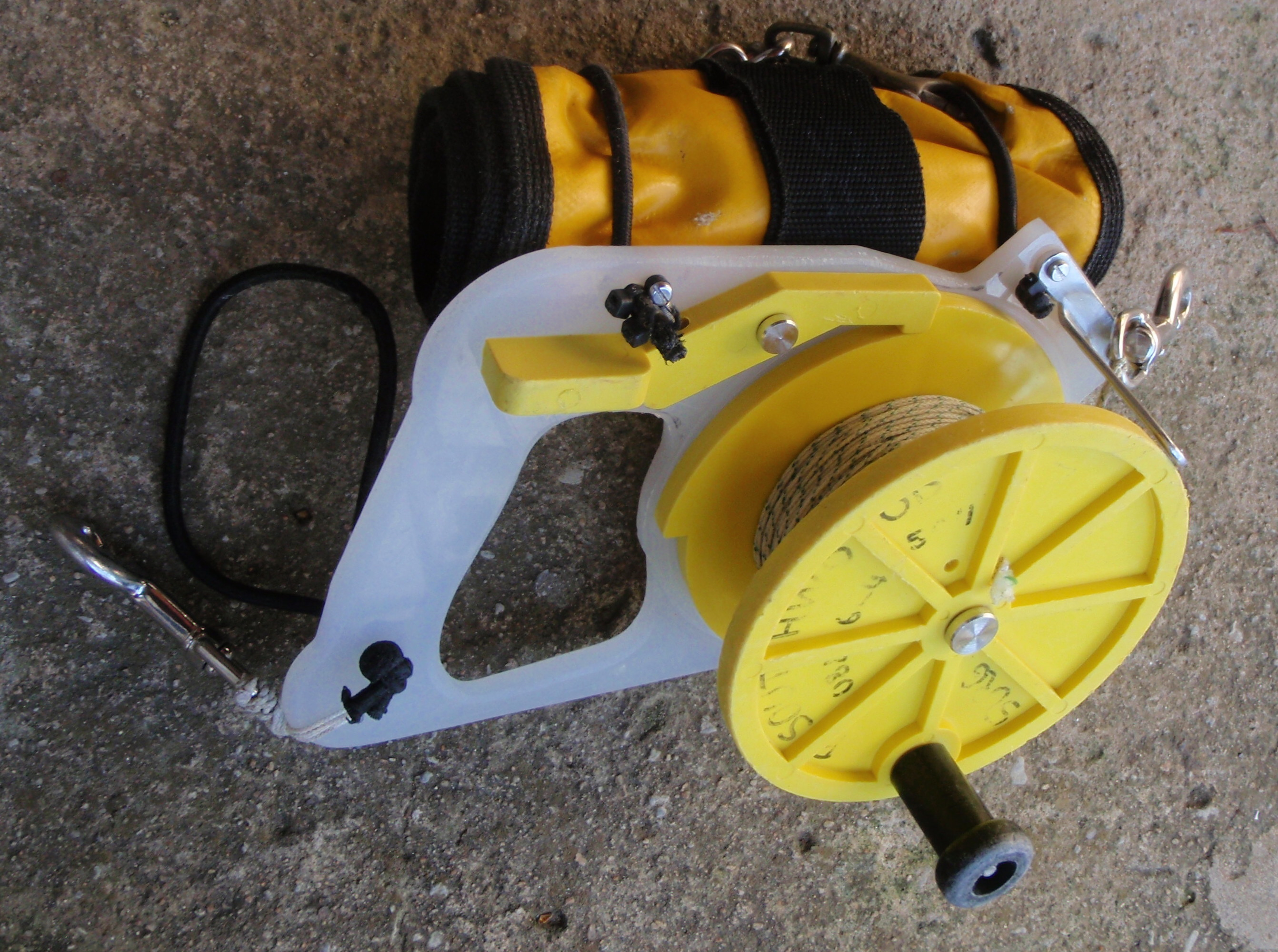
A rolled yellow DSMB secured to a dive reel with bungee loops.

Divers following the recommendations of some training organisations carry two differently coloured decompression buoys underwater so that they can signal to their surface support for help and still remain underwater decompressing. For example, in some circles in Europe, a red buoy indicates normal decompression and a yellow buoy indicates a problem, such as shortage of gas, that the surface support should investigate and resolve. Although in other circles, two buoys (any colour) up one line means the same, currently the protocol is not universally accepted even within Europe. While the usual colours are red, yellow and orange, bright pink, lime green, bicoloured red and yellow, and black buoys are also available and may show up well in particular circumstances. It is quite common to have one or more stripes of reflective tape, which reflect light back towards the source. This works well if searchers have a good light source.

=== Accessories ===
Some types of buoy provide an attachment for a strobe light, cyalume stick or writing slate, which can convey signals to the surface support. Reflective tape may be used to make the buoy more visible at night. Length is usually from 1 to 2 metres (3.3 to 6.6 ft). Visibility at a distance in waves is largely determined by height.

The size of a decompression buoy is to some extent at the diver's discretion. A tall buoy is more visible in rough water, and a larger diameter is visible at a greater distance. A large volume holds more gas and is more buoyant, which is helpful for some purposes, but is a greater hazard during deployment in the event of a reel jam.

=== Inflation methods ===
There are three basic methods available for inflating a DSMB: Oral inflation uses gas already breathed by the diver, exhaled into the buoy, either through a tube with a mouthpiece which may have a non-return valve if fitted to a closed buoy, or directly into the base of an open bottom buoy. Low pressure inflation may use a direct feed from a low-pressure hose, gas purged from a demand valve or released from a BCD inflator, or dumped from a BCD bladder via the oral inflation/dump valve, or inflation from low pressure hose through a valve fitted for this purpose. Integrated gas supply uses a small high-pressure cylinder directly mounted to the DSMB. Any compination of these methods may be available for a specific model.

=== Deployment practice ===
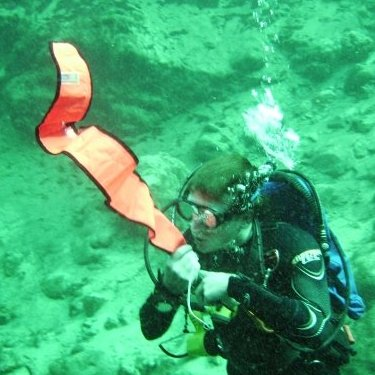
A diver preparing to inflate a DSMB by taking the primary demand valve out of their mouth and placing it under the DSMB opening

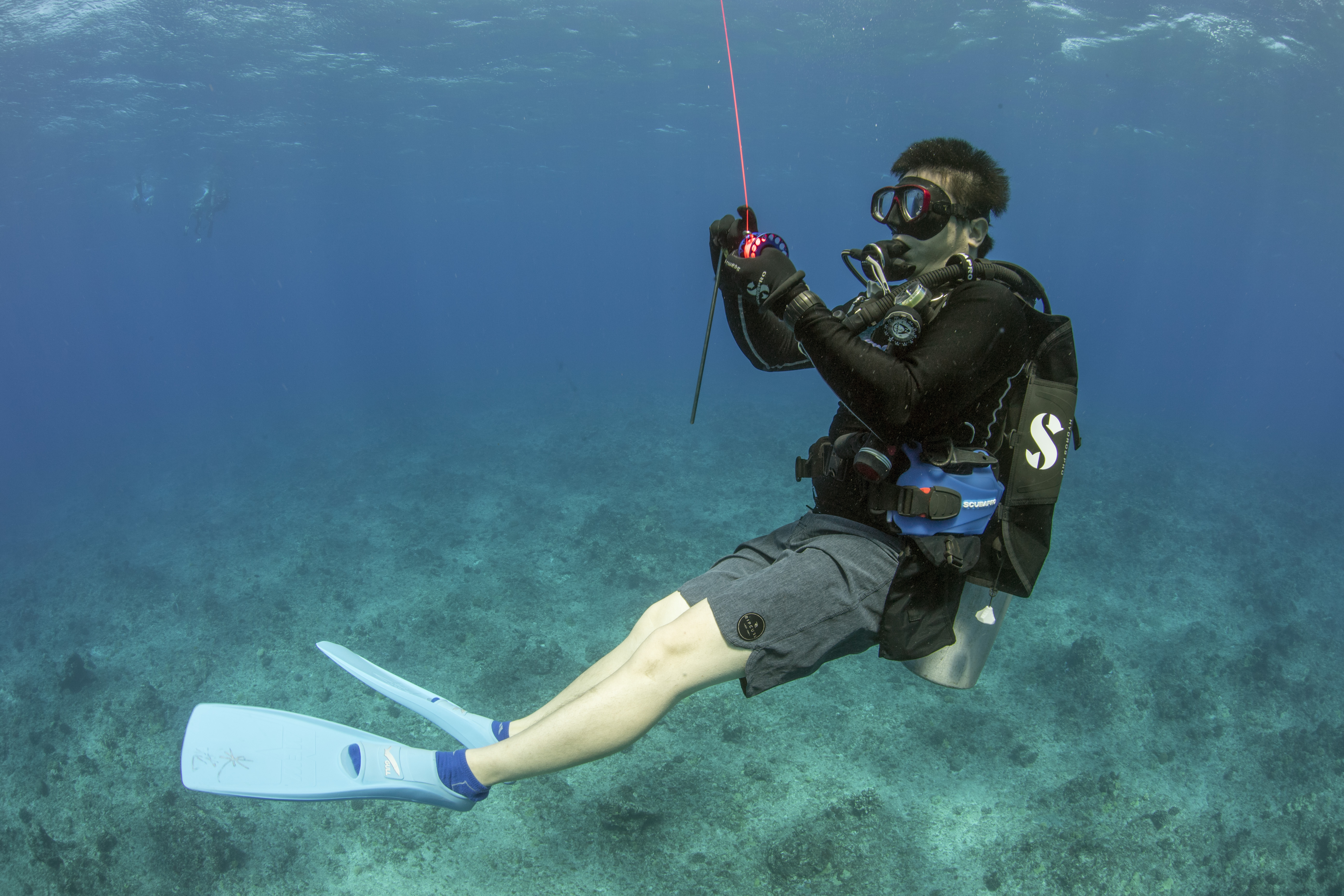
"Hanging" on a DSMB allows a diver to maintain a specific depth while resting

Reliably safe deployment in difficult conditions depends on sufficient practice and familiarity with the equipment and the specific technique to be used for inflation.

- Deployment may be from the bottom, as an aid to ascent and as a signal indicating position, from midwater, to indicate position, maintain decompression depth, and warn boat traffic, or at the surface as a means of attracting attention.
- The DSMB bag is unrolled. It may be necessary to connect it to the line on the reef or spool, but in many cases it is stored already connected. A quick but secure method of connection such as a bolt snap avoids delays and task loading distraction.
- The reel or spool is unclipped from the diver's harness if this has not already been done. The risk of uncontrolled ascent if the reel jams during deployment and is connected to the diver is generally considered unacceptable.
- A small amount of gas is introduced into the bag to vertically align the buoy, and allow the diver to check that the assembly is ready to deploy the line freely. Any clip or locking device restricting line deployment is released. A friction brake should allow easy but slightly restrained rotation to prevent inertia overwind. The diver adjusts buoyancy to ensure that they do not float upwards excessively during the deployment. The amount of buoyancy adjustment will vary with depth and the method of filling the buoy, but ascending a few metres during deployment is generally considered to just be the start of ascent.
- Sufficient gas to adequately inflate the buoy when at the surface is introduced, taking into account the expansion due to reduced ambient pressure during ascent, by one of the following methods, and the bag released to ascend. A ratchet reel should be held with the pawl disengaged, a spool allowed to spin on a finger or in a cupped hand:
  - The valve of the integral inflation cylinder is cracked open.
  - The bottom opening of the buoy is held open above the exhaust opening of the demand valve in use for breathing, and a few breaths exhaled.
  - A demand valve mouthpiece is held under the bottom opening and the DV purged.
  - A low pressure inflation hose end is pushed onto the inflation tube of the buoy, which automatically releases gas into the buoy. When released it will automatically disconnect.
  - The mouthpiece of the buoyancy compensator control valve is held under the bottom opening and the contents of the BC discharged into the buoy. If more gas is needed, the inflate and dump valves are opened together and gas flows into the buoy bypassing the BCD. This procedure requires the valve to be higher than the BC bladder to induce air flow by hydrostatic pressure difference.
  - A dedicated valve on an extra low pressure hose can be used at the bottom opening of the buoy.
  - The diver can orally inflate the buoy through an oral inflation valve, if fitted.
- In all cases, the amount of slack line should be kept to a minimum to reduce the risk of fouling on the diver or equipment, and the reel or spool held away from the diver while unrolling. The diver should ensure slightly negative buoyancy to allow sufficient filling without being dragged up by the partly filled buoy to a depth where expanding gas makes buoyancy control difficult. This is easier at depth, but the risk of injury if dragged up is also greater.
- The diver checks that there are no line snags on any equipment, and takes up any slack by winding the line onto the reel or spool, before starting the ascent.
- Tension should be maintained on the line during ascent to avoid entanglement, by reeling it in as fast as the diver ascends. This is easily controlled by maintaining slight negative buoyancy at all times.

=== Deployment problems and hazards ===
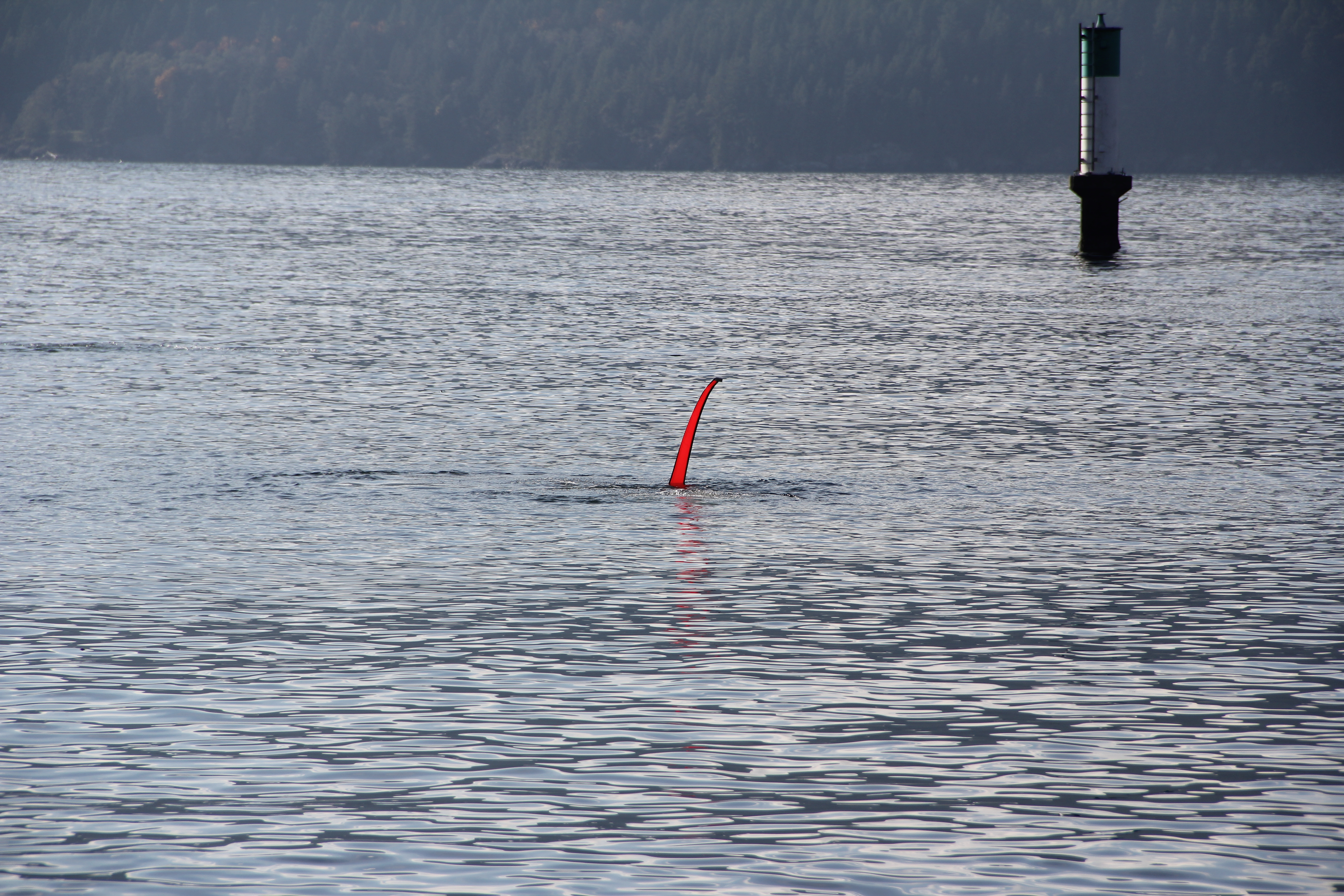
A DSMB upright at the surface often indicates that a diver is in the process of surfacing

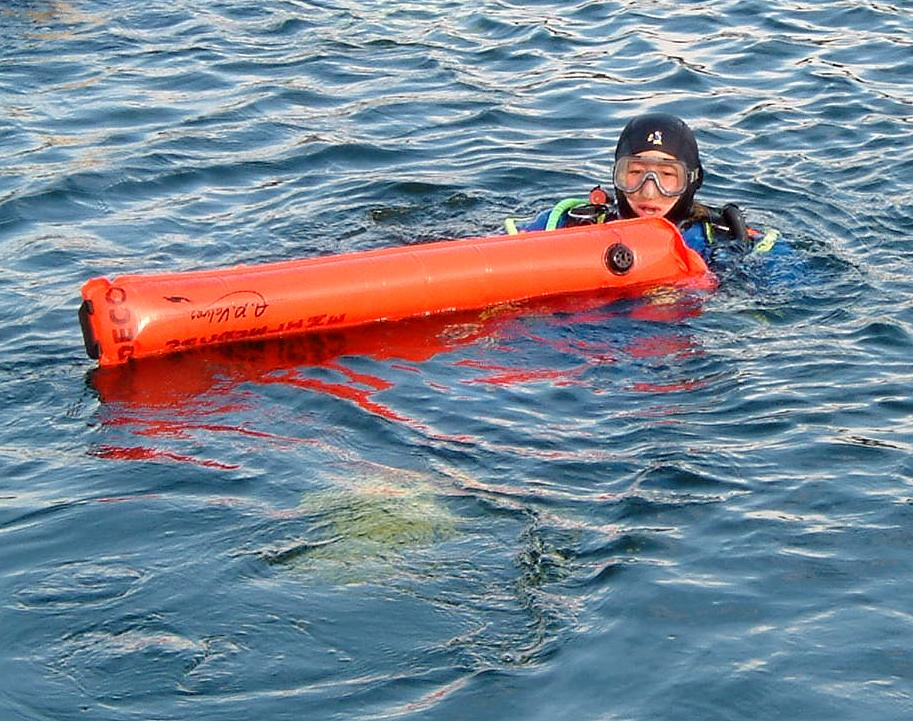
Divers reel in the deco buoy as they ascend so they surface next to it. As well as maintaining a taut line, this also avoids the hazard of surfacing in the path of watercraft that are avoiding the buoy.

Several problems may be encountered when deploying decompression buoys.

- The reel jams after the buoy is inflated, dragging the diver up. This can be compounded by expansion of the gas in a dry suit, and gas in the buoyancy compensator, all of which must be dealt with at the same time, and fast enough to prevent an uncontrolled ascent. To avoid this, a diver can:
  - before the dive, ensure that the line is rolled up on the reel under appropriate tension without overwinds;
  - ensure that the line on the reel is free from knots, loops or tangles;
  - use a simpler system or a reel which cannot jam (e.g. a weighted spool of line);
  - detach the lanyard connecting the diver to the reel before inflating the buoy and ensure no equipment is snagged on the buoy or reel. If the reel jams it is simply abandoned;
  - attach two reels to each other in series. If one fails the other is unlocked to reel out its line.
- The diver or part of the diver's equipment gets snagged or entangled on the buoy or line, dragging the diver up, with possibly fatal consequences. To avoid this, a diver may:
  - tie the lanyard of the reel to something solid on the sea bed before inflating the buoy, giving time to sort the problem out. This is not always practicable - the buoy may be deployed in midwater:
  - avoid bights of slack line which could loop around anything while filling the buoy;
  - keep the buoy and line away from the diver's other equipment during deployment, particularly away from equipment that the diver cannot easily see or reach. In effect this means keeping the line and buoy in front of, and above the diver as much as possible.
- The diver removes the primary demand valve from his or her mouth to inflate the buoy, and is therefore at a disadvantage in dealing with any other problems that might arise as the deco buoy goes up. The ways to avoid this include:
  - using a deco buoy with its own air supply;
  - using a secondary demand valve, such as an octopus, to inflate the buoy;
  - using a sealed buoy with an inflation valve, which is filled by blowing directly into the valve inlet or by attaching a medium-pressure inflation hose from the buoyancy compensator (BCD) or dry suit (the valve does not retain the hose connector, like the BCD or suit inflator valve, and the hose can be easily pulled off the valve when the buoy is sufficiently filled);
  - holding an open ended buoy above the primary demand valve exhaust port and direct several exhalations up into the open end of the buoy. This technique is also useful in cold conditions to prevent a freeflow caused by high flow rate due to pressing the purge button.
  - Filling an open-ended DSMB from the buoyancy compensator power inflator head. This also allows the diver to dump gas from the BCD into the DSMB, keeping a constant buoyancy for part of the filling procedure. If there is not enough gas in the BCD, the power inflator can be used to supply more gas to the DSMB by pressing the inflate and deflate buttons simultaneously, diverting the inflation gas through the exhaust valve to the DSMB. Once the DSMB reaches the surface, it will support the diver and buoyancy can be readjusted under controlled conditions.
- The demand valve develops a free-flow while filling the DSMB. This can deplete the contents of the scuba cylinder rapidly, and since the DSMB is commonly deployed at the end of the dive, when the breathing gas has reached a critically low level, this can put the diver in a situation of inadequate gas supply for a safe ascent. This risk is greater in very cold conditions when regulator freezing is possible. This can be avoided by:
  - not using a demand valve to fill the DSMB;
  - using a desensitised demand valve which is less likely to free-flow;
  - Using exhaled gas from the DV exhaust port.
- The reel over-rotates, causing a loose bight, which can snag or jam the reel. This can be avoided by having sufficient friction in the reel spindle that the drag slows rotation rapidly when there is not enough tension in the line to maintain unrolling, or by holding a hand against the reel to slow it down.

== Safety sausage ==
A safety sausage or signal tube is an inflatable buoy used when the diver is at the surface to indicate the diver's position to the dive boat, reducing the risk of losing contact when air, light or sea conditions decrease the visibility of the divers from the boat. The sausage is a plastic tube that is normally inflated by putting one end under water and purging the second stage underneath to inflate it. Inflated tubes are normally about 6 feet (2 m) tall. Uninflated tubes roll up and fit in a buoyancy compensator pocket. Commercial boat dive operations, especially at offshore reefs or areas known for strong currents or rapid weather changes, may require divers to carry safety sausages or an equivalent. A safety sausage is not a substitute for a surface marker buoy or diver down flag, though some divers use the term safety sausage to refer to a DSMB as well as a signal tube.

The safety sausage is claimed to have been invented by New Zealand diver Bob Begg in 1984 after a search and rescue exercise organized by the Dunedin Marine Search and Rescue Advisory Committee failed to find the two divers equipped with yellow scuba cylinders, yellow BCDs, and a yellow catch bag, in an unsuccessful air search of about 3 hours, during which the aircraft with experienced spotters flew directly over the divers at least once without seeing them. The divers were eventually spotted by a fishing boat.

== Point of interest markers ==
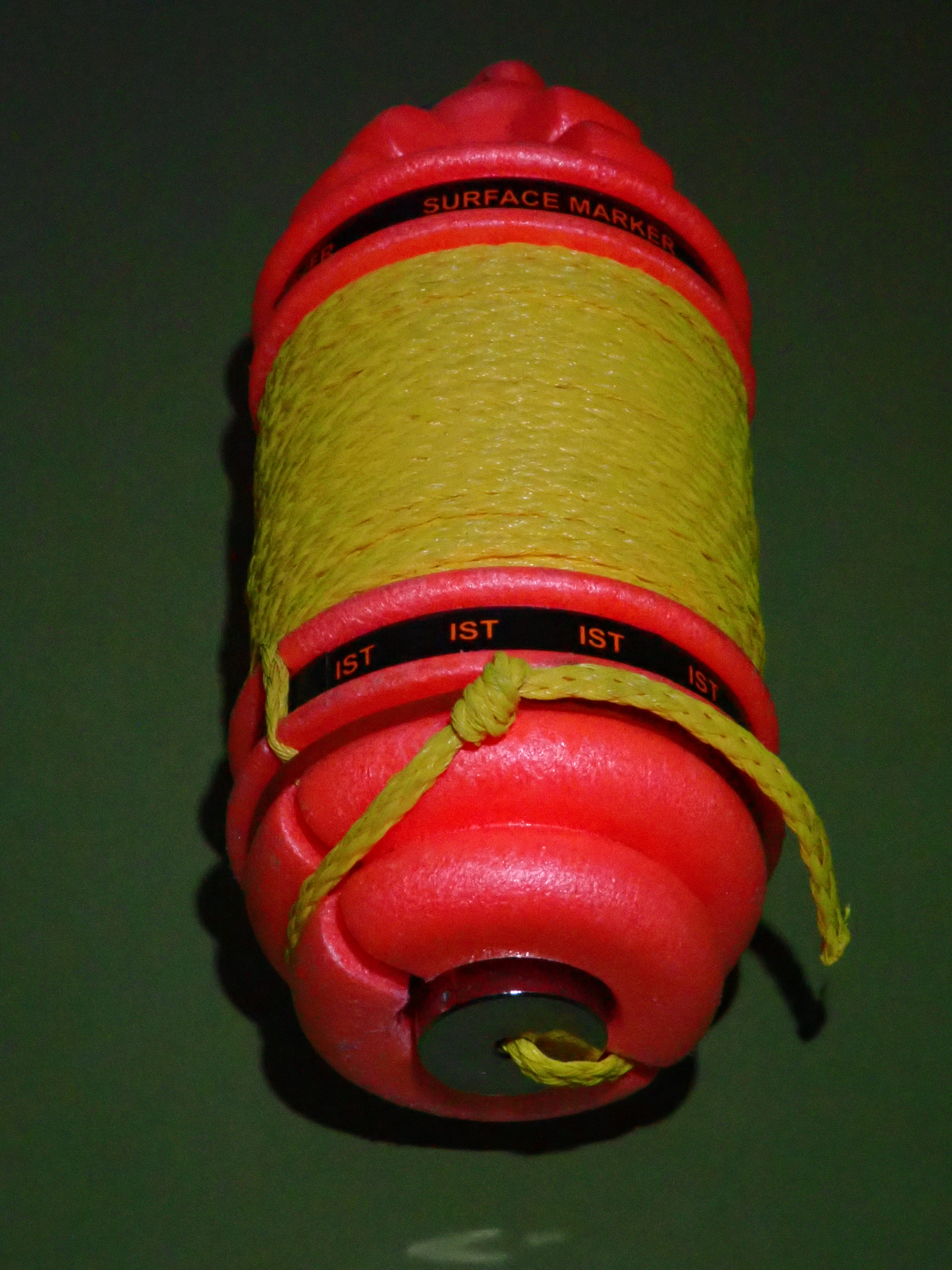
Hard foam buoy with integrally stowed weight and line used by divers to mark an underwater point of interest

Small deployable marker buoys are available that are provided with a length of line wrapped around the hard foam buoy, and with a small weight which almost balances the buoyancy. These can be deployed by a diver to mark a point of interest and can be recovered from the surface after the dive. They are deployed by releasing the weight from the buoy and allowing the line to unroll as the buoy floats to the surface. If the line is long enough the buoy will float at the surface with slack in the line and the weight will anchor it in place. If the line is too short the buoy will support the weight above the bottom and drift away.

== See also ==
- Distance line – Line deployed by scuba divers for navigation
- Dive leader – Recreational diving certification and role
- Lifting bag – Airtight bag used for underwater buoyant lifting when filled with air
- Line holder – Simple device for storing and deploying line underwater
- Scuba equipment – Equipment needed for scuba diving
- Technical diving – Diving beyond the scope of recreational diving
