= Marine thruster =

Device on a marine vehicle for producing directed hydrodynamic thrust

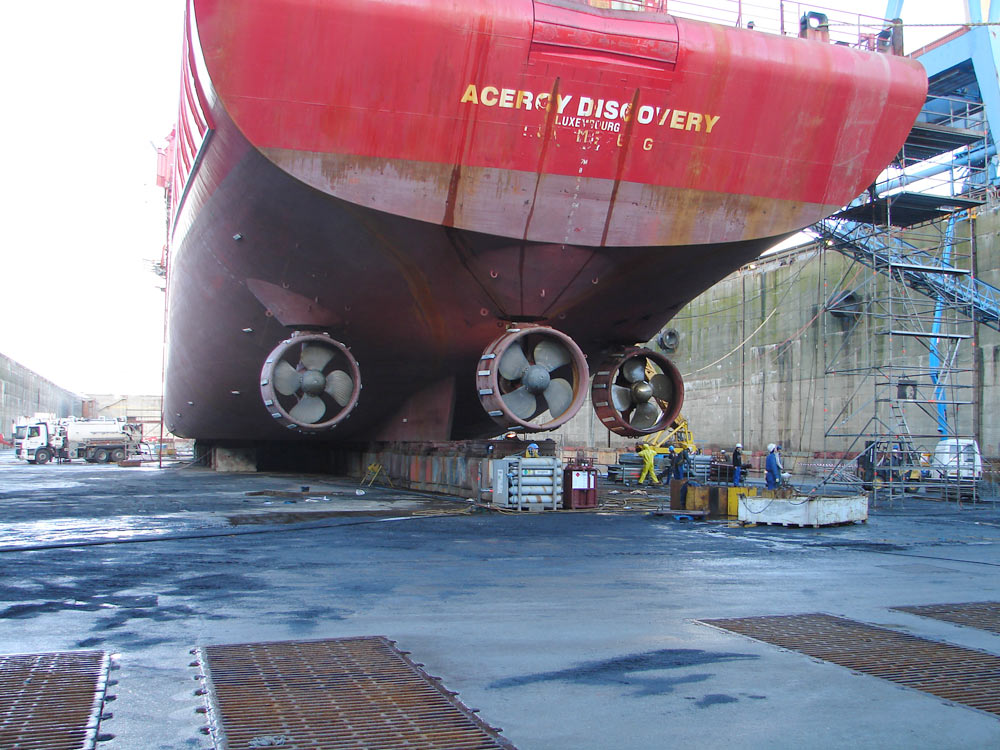
A set of Azimuth Thrusters on the Acergy Discovery in dry dock

A marine thruster is a device for producing directed hydrodynamic thrust mounted on a marine vehicle, primarily for maneuvering or propulsion. There are a variety of different types of marine thrusters and each of them plays a role in the maritime industry. Marine thrusters come in many different shapes and sizes, for example screw propellers, Voith-Schneider propellers, waterjets, ducted propellers, tunnel bow thrusters, and stern thrusters, azimuth thrusters, rim-driven thrusters, ROV and submersible drive units. A marine thruster consists of a propeller or impeller which may be encased in some kind of tunnel or ducting that directs the flow of water to produce a resultant force intended to obtain movement in the desired direction or resist forces which would cause unwanted movement. The two subcategories of marine thrusters are for propulsion and maneuvering, the maneuvering thruster typically in the form of bow or stern thrusters and propulsion thrusters ranging from Azimuth thrusters to Rim Drive thrusters.

== Positioning Thrusters ==
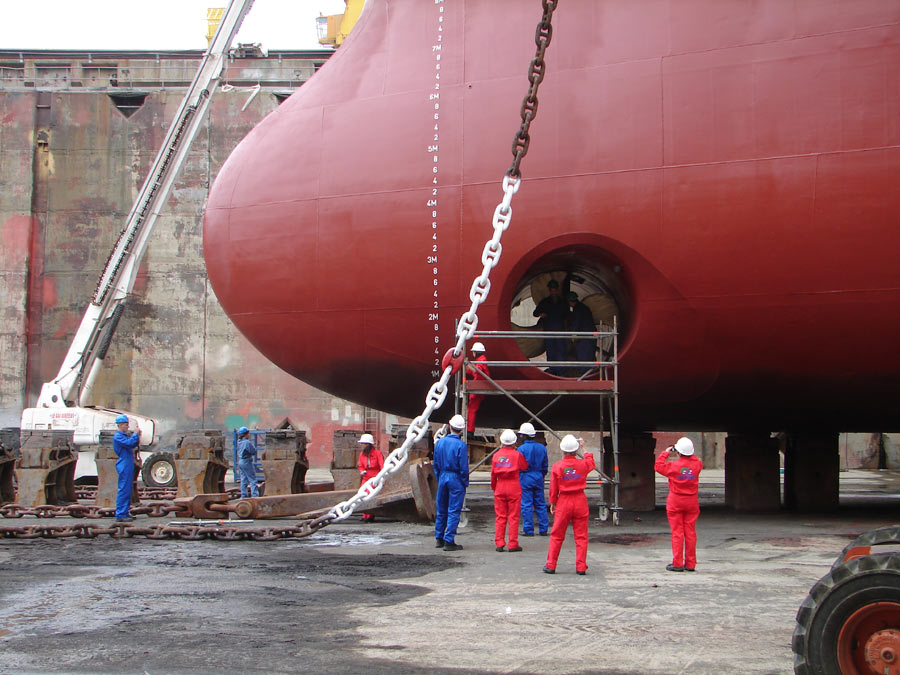
Repairs being performed on the bow thruster of the Bro Elizabeth

Positioning thrusters come in applications, Bow thrusters at the forward end of the vessel, and stern thrusters mounted aft on the boat. Their purpose is to maneuver or position the boat to a greater precision than the propulsion device can accomplish. Their positioning along the length of the vessel allows for directed lateral thrust ahead and astern of the centre of lateral resistance so that the vessel may be maneuvered away from obstructions in its path, or towards a desired position, especially when coming to or away from a dock. These positioning thrusters are usually significantly smaller than the main propulsion thrusters because they only have to do small adjustments rather than moving the whole vessel at speed. Both bow and stern thrusters may be housed in through-hull tunnels. Depending on the size of the motors driving these propellers, they could draw an insignificant amount of power or a large amount of power that requires much caution to operate. Another smaller subset of positioning thrusters is those used for maneuvering unmanned aquatic vehicles like Guanay II AUV tested by scientists from Spain (Masmitja, 2018).

== Propulsion Thrusters ==
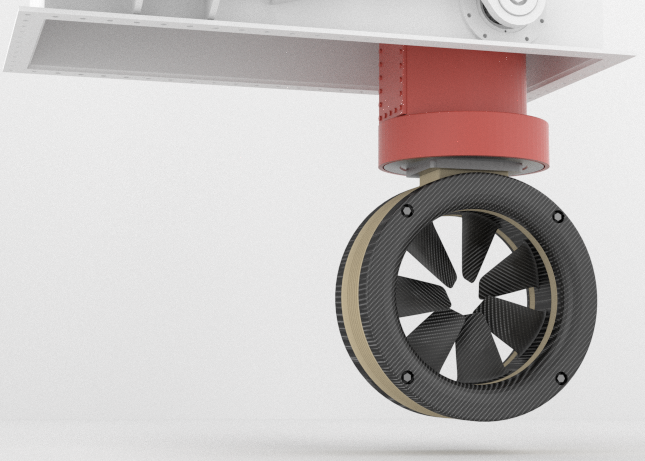
Rim-Driven Thruster on a Swing-Out Azimuthing unit

Propulsion thrusters are those thrusters which provide longitudinal motion for vessels as an alternative to traditional propellers. There are a variety of types of propulsion thrusters but the most common form is the azimuth thruster, that can rotate 360 degrees on a vertical axis to optionally produce thrust for maneuvering. (Lindborg, 1997). The amount of thrust produced is controllable. There are variants of azimuth thrusters such as CRP thrusters which have two contra-rotating Azimuth thrusters or Swing-Up Azimuth thrusters that can be retracted when not in use to reduce drag on the vessel (Wartsila Encyclopedia). Other propulsion thrusters like outboard thrusters which can be easily put in and out of service, rim drive thrusters that are driven via the external ring with the blades mounted on the inner face of the ring with their tips towards the center, or tilted thrusters pointed away from the hull to minimize interaction with the ship and increase thruster efficiency. The choice between using thrusters or traditional propellers to propel marine vessels is a compromise between versatility and efficiency. Propellers are designed to work in-line with a propulsion plant and produce one-directional thrust while thrusters are more customizable and have a more versatile application. They have this versatility at the cost of complexity and lower efficiency – they are not as robust as propellers and typically have applications on smaller vessels that don't require as much power.
