= Dive boat =

Boat used for the support of scuba diving operations

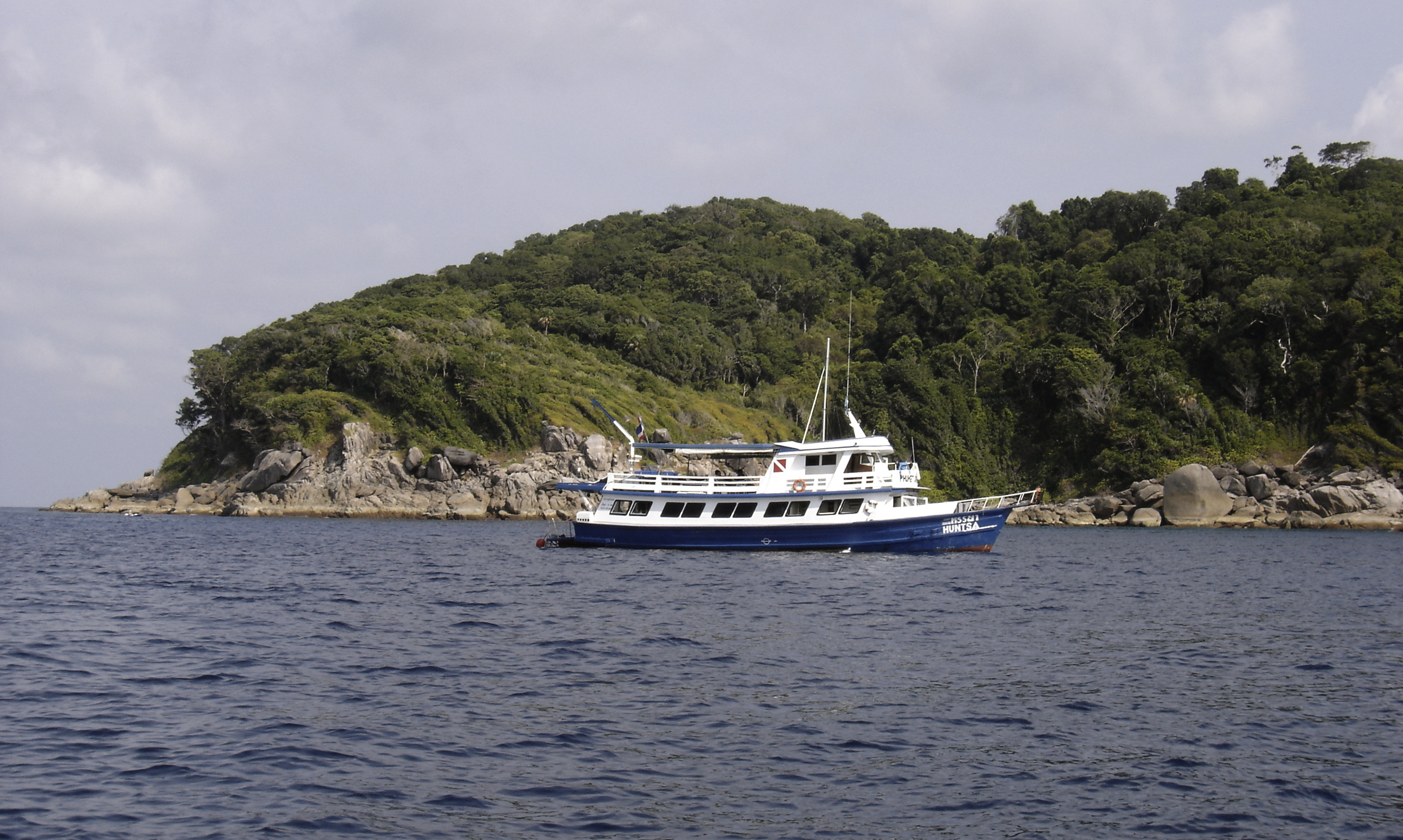
A liveaboard dive boat on the Similan Islands, Thailand

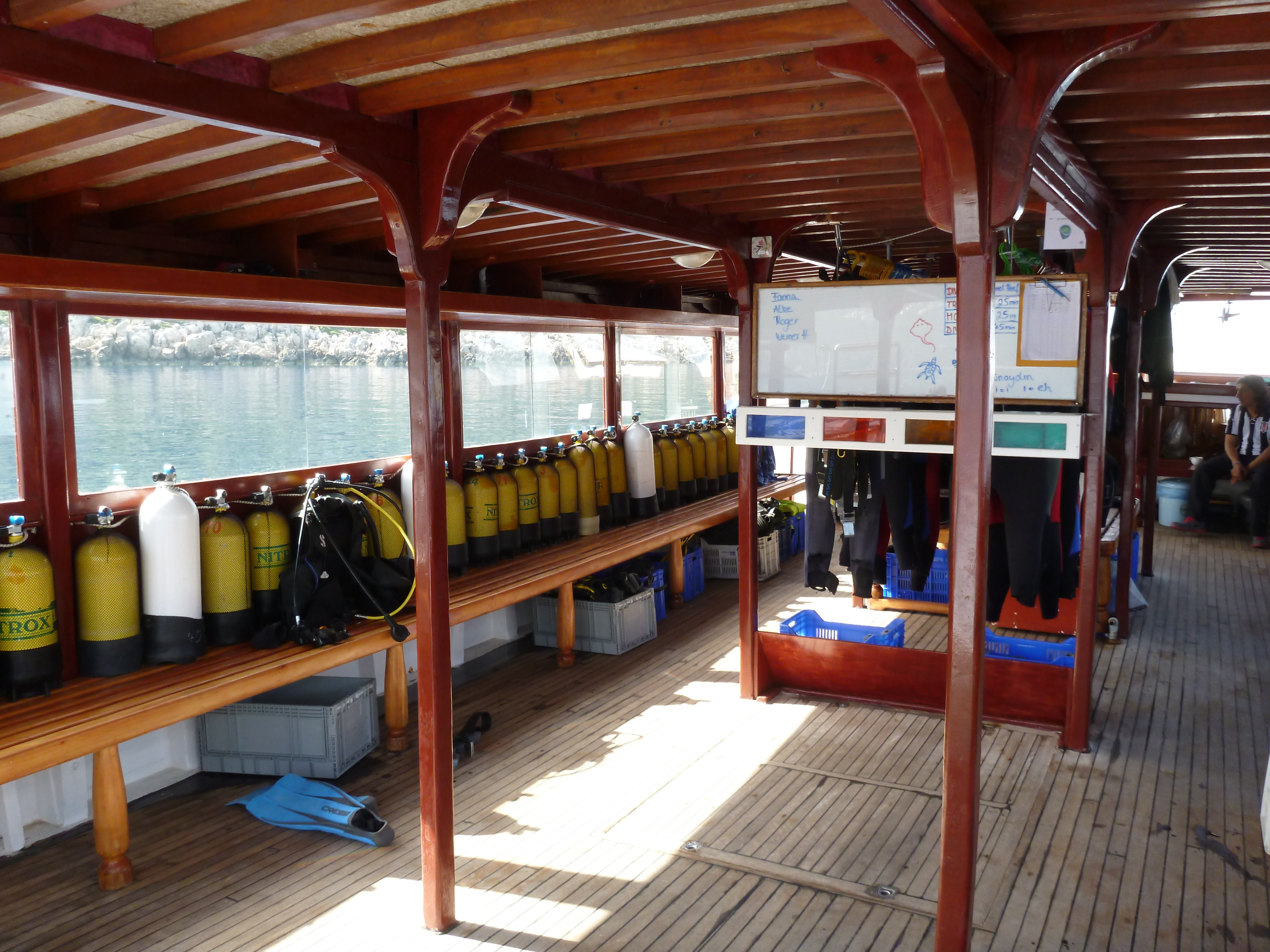
Deck of a dive boat for about 35 divers, with equipment and whiteboard for dive planning

A dive boat is a boat that recreational divers or professional scuba divers use to reach a dive site which they could not conveniently reach by swimming from the shore. Dive boats may be propelled by wind or muscle power, but are usually powered by internal combustion engines. Some features, like convenient access from the water, are common to all dive boats, while others depend on the specific application or region where they are used. The vessel may be extensively modified to make it fit for purpose, or may be used without much adaptation if it is already usable.

Dive boats may simply transport divers and their equipment to and from the dive site for a single dive, or may provide longer term support and shelter for day trips or periods of several consecutive days. Deployment of divers may be while moored, at anchor, or under way, (also known as live-boating or live-boat diving). There are a range of specialised procedures for boat diving, which include water entry and exit, avoiding injury by the dive boat, and keeping the dive boat crew aware of the location of the divers in the water.

There are also procedures used by the boat crew, to avoid injuring the divers in the water, keeping track of where they are during a dive, recalling the divers in an emergency, and ensuring that none are left behind.

== Purpose ==
The dive boat provides a means of transport to and from dive sites which may be too far or inconvenient for shore access. This is the case with the majority of recreational dive sites. It can also provide a base of operations where the divers can shelter, rest, store and change gear, socialise with other divers, eat and sleep between dives. They can provide enhanced safety, comfort and convenience, and provide guided access to sites of particular interest, but introduce their own set of hazards. They can also provide access to diving procedures which may be difficult, dangerous or impossible from the shore.

== Types of dive boat ==
The usual classification of recreational dive boats based on operational parameters includes:

- basic dive boats
- day boats
- liveaboards

Some overlap of function is possible. Dive boats may be privately owned and operated, or run as a commercial business (generally known as charter boats).

The structure, layout and size of a dive boat for any given application may vary considerably according to regional requirements and traditions, and convenience.

=== Basic dive boats ===
These are usually open boats used for short distance, or short duration, trips to dive sites, usually for a single dive or sometimes for a "two tank" trip, either with both dives at the same site, or with the second dive on the way back, or a short distance from the first. They generally have no amenities other than seating and stowage for dive gear, and the divers are usually exposed to wind, spray and sun during the trip. It is common for divers to kit up in their dive suits before boarding, for protection from the weather. It is unusual for the operator to provide refreshments other than bottled drinking water and an after-dive candy.

==== Rigid-hulled inflatable boat ====
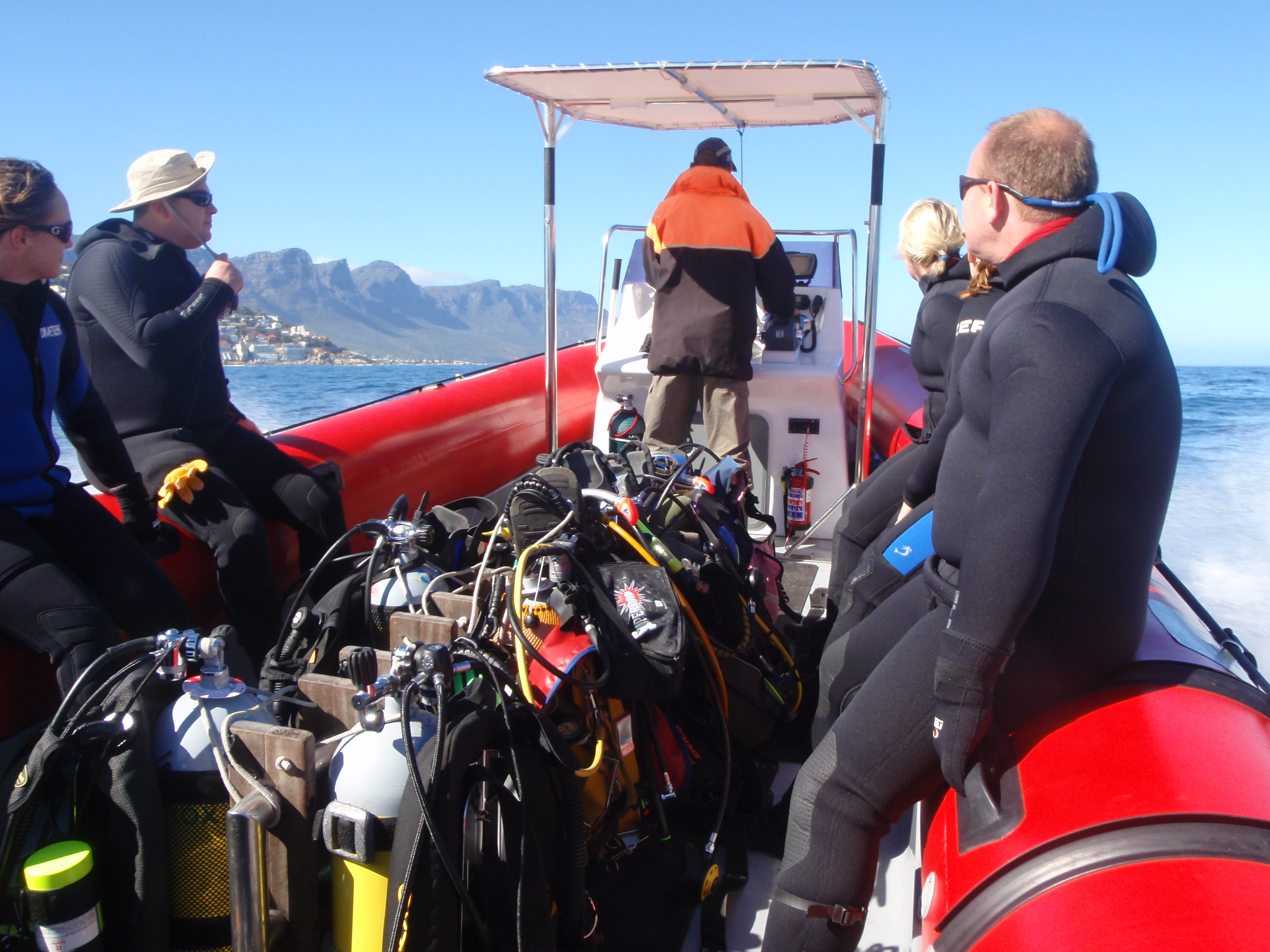
Travelling to the dive site in a fast RIB. This boat is licensed to carry 12 divers and can travel at over 30kt on flat water

Divers only spend a few hours at a time on these fast but exposed boats. The boats are usually relatively small so they can easily be transported on roads and launched at a convenient site depending on the weather. Boats of this size can be launched from slipways or through the surf on suitable beaches. The smaller models are suitable for private use, as they can only transport a few divers. The larger boats can carry enough divers to be viable for professional use. These boats will generally carry basic safety equipment such as marine VHF radio, small boat safety gear, lifejackets and first aid oxygen administration equipment.

Space in the boat is limited, and divers generally travel and kit up while sitting on the tubes opposite a central cylinder rack where the fully rigged scuba sets are stowed. Water entry is commonly by simultaneous rolling backwards over the side, and return to the boat by climbing back in over the tubes one at a time after removing the heavy parts of the diving equipment and handing it up to the crew. Some boats have ladders which hook over the tubes to make boarding easier for the less athletic diver, others rely on assistance from the crew. An advantage of this type of boat compared with similar-sized rigid boats is that the inflated tubes make the boat very stable during the entry and exit of the divers and if the boat is filled with water during surf transit maneuvers. These boats are usually fairly fast, maneuverable, seaworthy in surf and rough conditions, and relatively wet and uncomfortable. They seldom provide any shelter from the elements, and their advantages are that they get the diver to the site and back fairly quickly, are generally good for operation through surf, are usually trailerable and can be launched at slipways and beaches.

==== Open rigid hulled boats ====
These serve a similar function to the Rigid-hulled inflatable boats, but do not have inflatable tubes. They are more durable, but usually heavier for the same load capacity. In Australia and New Zealand the light aluminium "tinnie" is often used as a dive boat. These boats are usually less stable than the equivalent inflatable and are not as easy to climb back on board, but are light, durable and economical. Kayaks and canoes are occasionally used as dive boats for one or two divers, and are portable and paddled by the occupants.

==== Decked rigid hulled boats ====
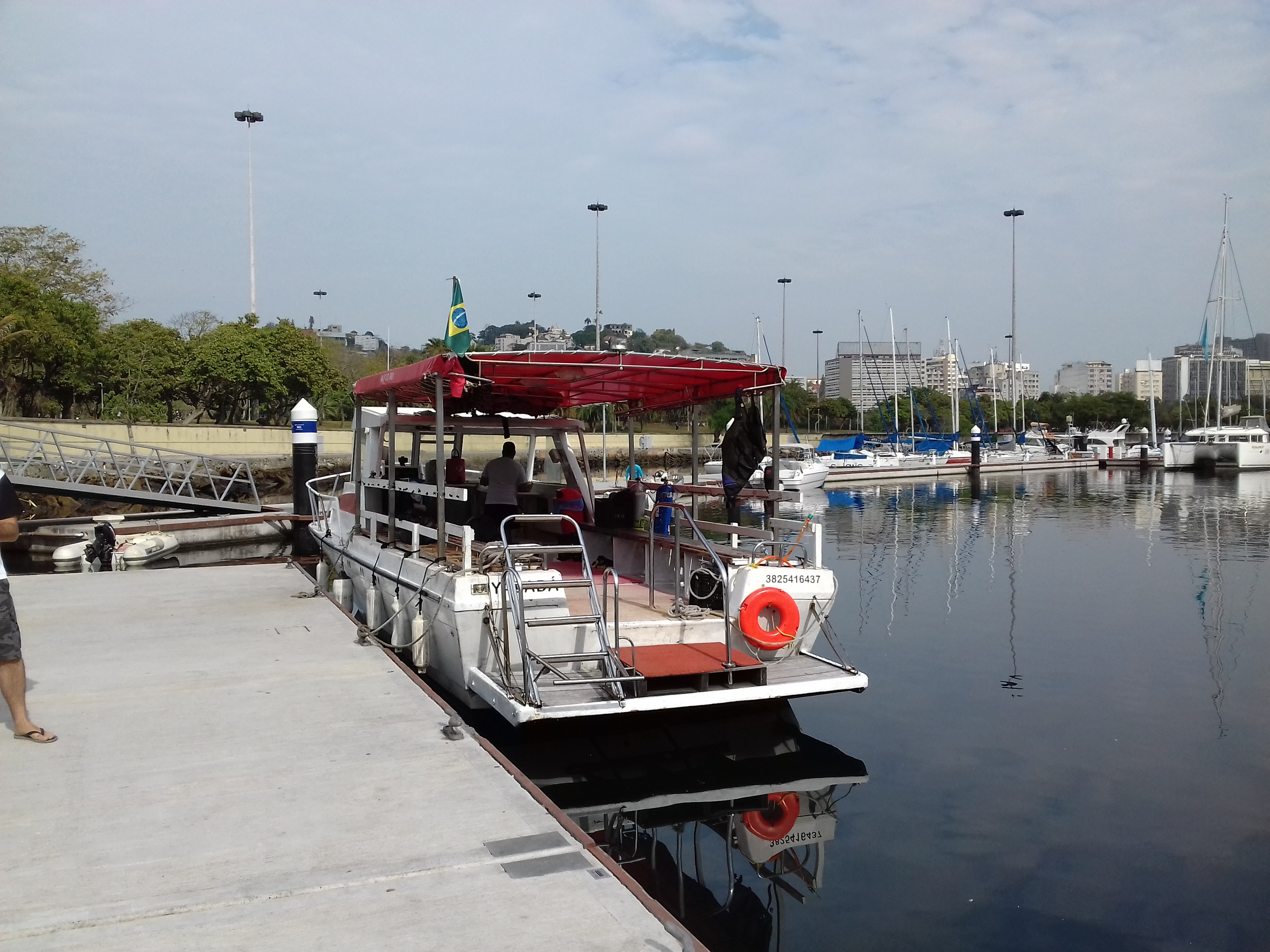
Flush decked dive boat with transom platform and ladder, and shade awning, suitable for tropical use over short distances.

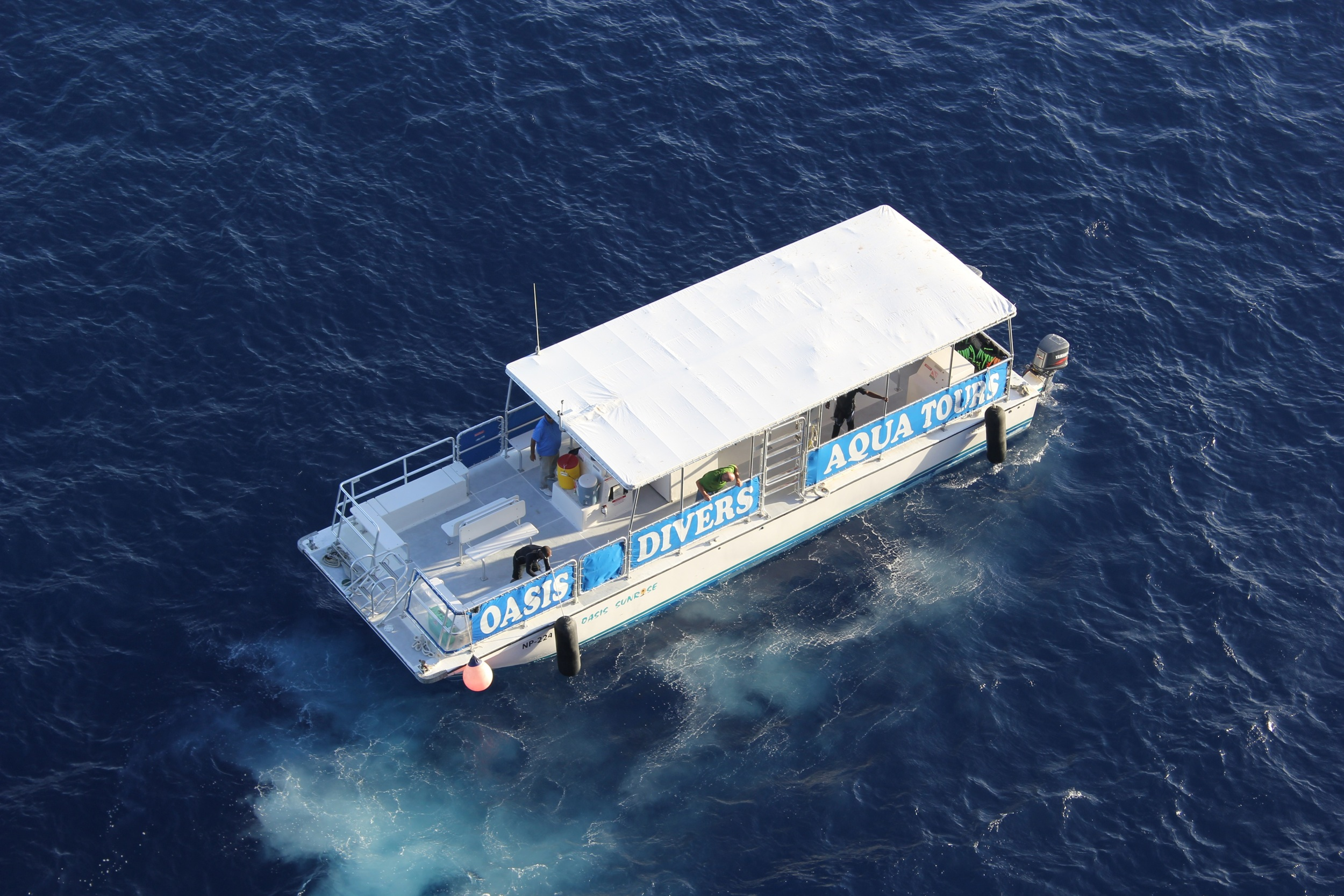
Another arrangement of a flush decked rigid hulled dive boat suitable for flat water and sunshine, with side mounted boarding ladders and centreline seats.

Flush decked boats with transom boarding arrangements are commonly used in areas with generally pleasant weather and sea conditions. The flush deck with seating and storage along the sides leaves the centre of the deck open for movement to and from the stern. Gates in the handrails amidships may be provided to get divers into the water more quickly, and an awning may be provided for protection from the sun.

==== Inflatable boats ====
These are usually relatively small and used only for short distances with a small number of divers. They are relatively uncomfortable, and not usually very fast, but are stable for their size and can be deflated, folded, and transported in a car or utility vehicle.

=== Day boat ===
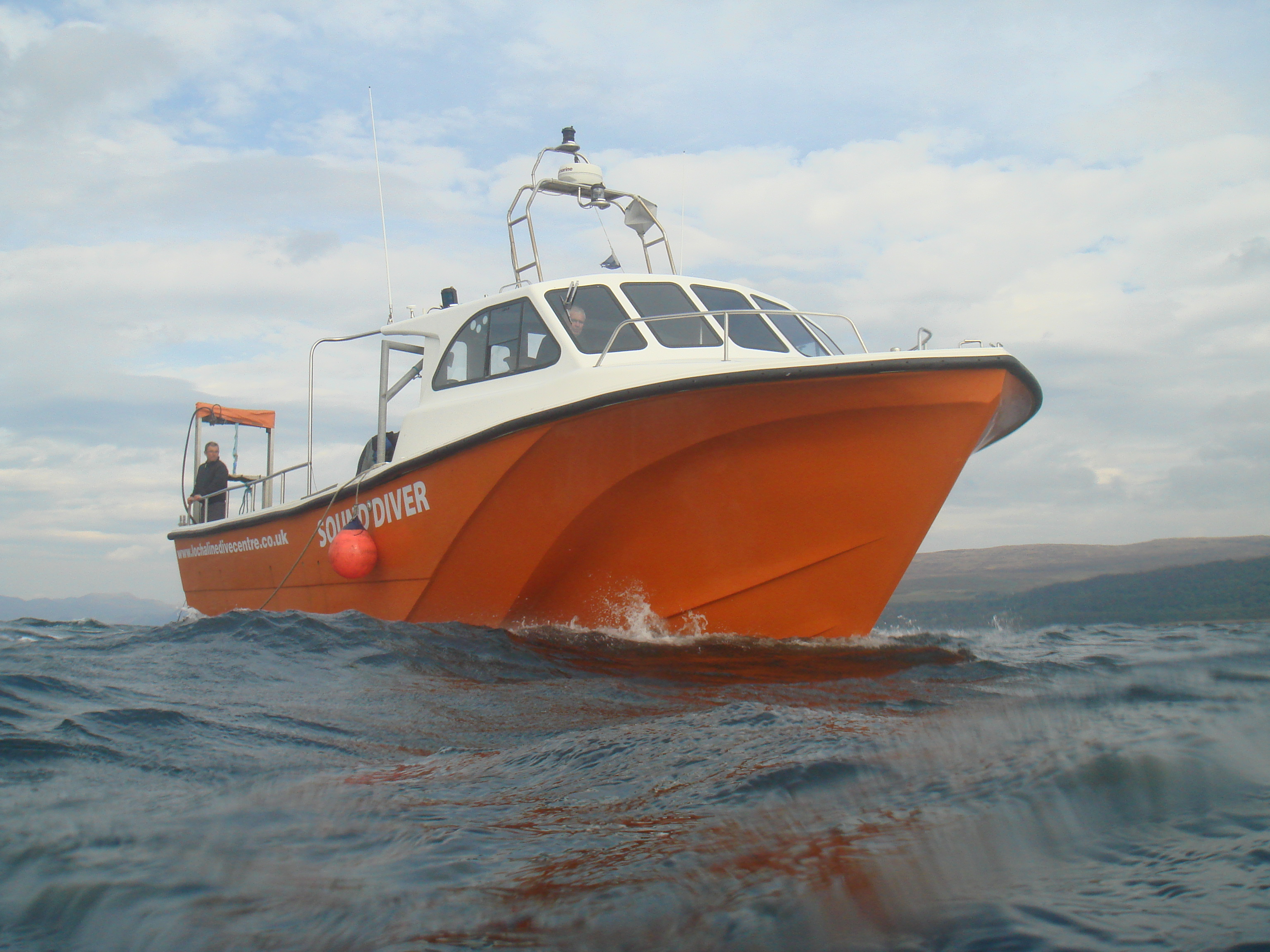
Rigid hulled day boat

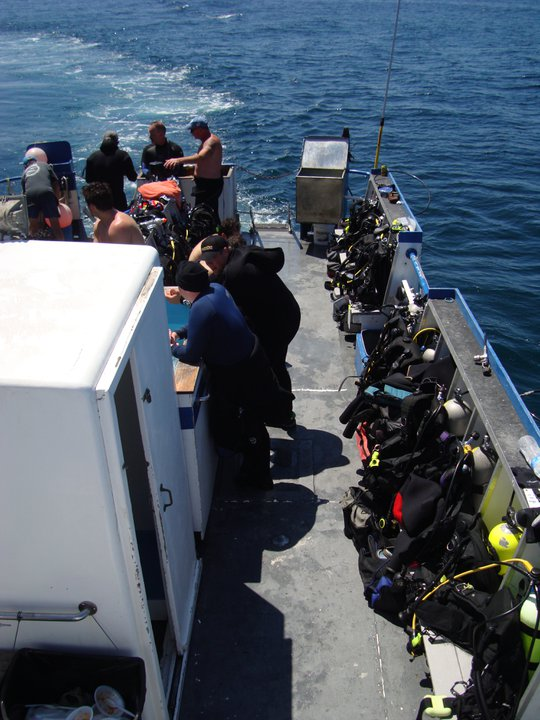
Divers on the deck of a day dive boat

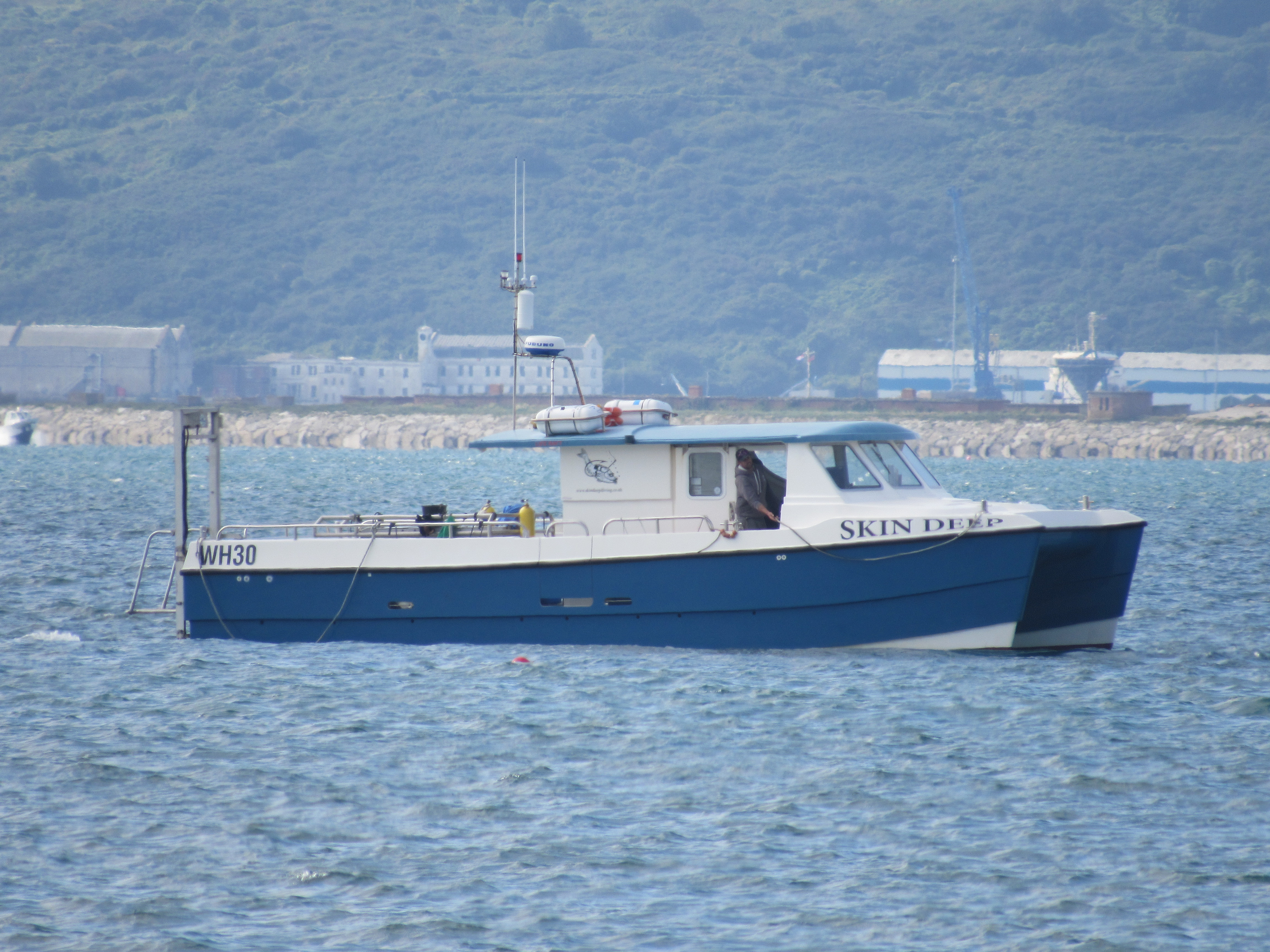
Catamaran dive boat Skin Deep with diver lift

These boats are usually made of rigid materials - such as glass reinforced resin, plywood or aluminium. Day boats are generally relatively large: typically, between 60 and 90 feet (18 and 27 m) in length, as they must provide some comfort for the passengers for several hours. Many day boats are used for scuba-divers and also for other marine tourism activities such as fishing and whale-watching. In general, divers or passengers will spend only the daylight hours on a day boat, and do not sleep in them overnight. Dive boats which provide sleeping accommodation are generally referred to as "liveaboard" boats. Generally a professional crew operate the boat. The boat provides shelter from the weather and is likely to have various facilities such as a toilet (called the "head") and a small kitchen (called a "galley"), to cater for the guests and crew. Day-boats may have a saloon where divers can relax on upholstered benches, and one or more dining tables. Many day boats also have an uncovered sun-deck, and a shaded area, for divers wishing to be out in the open air. The boat will usually have a diving air compressor, oxygen first aid, a VHF radio, a GPS and possibly gas blending facilities. A day boat would generally be used to transport divers to multiple dive-sites (typically between one and three sites) during the same day, or multiple dives at the same site, with surface rest and refreshment periods between them.

The divers usually enter the water by stepping off a dive platform or the side of the boat, and return on board using a ladder or a lift. In some cases a smaller "tender" is used to carry divers to and from less accessible sites, and to rescue divers who are in difficulty or who drift away from the boat.

=== Liveaboard ===
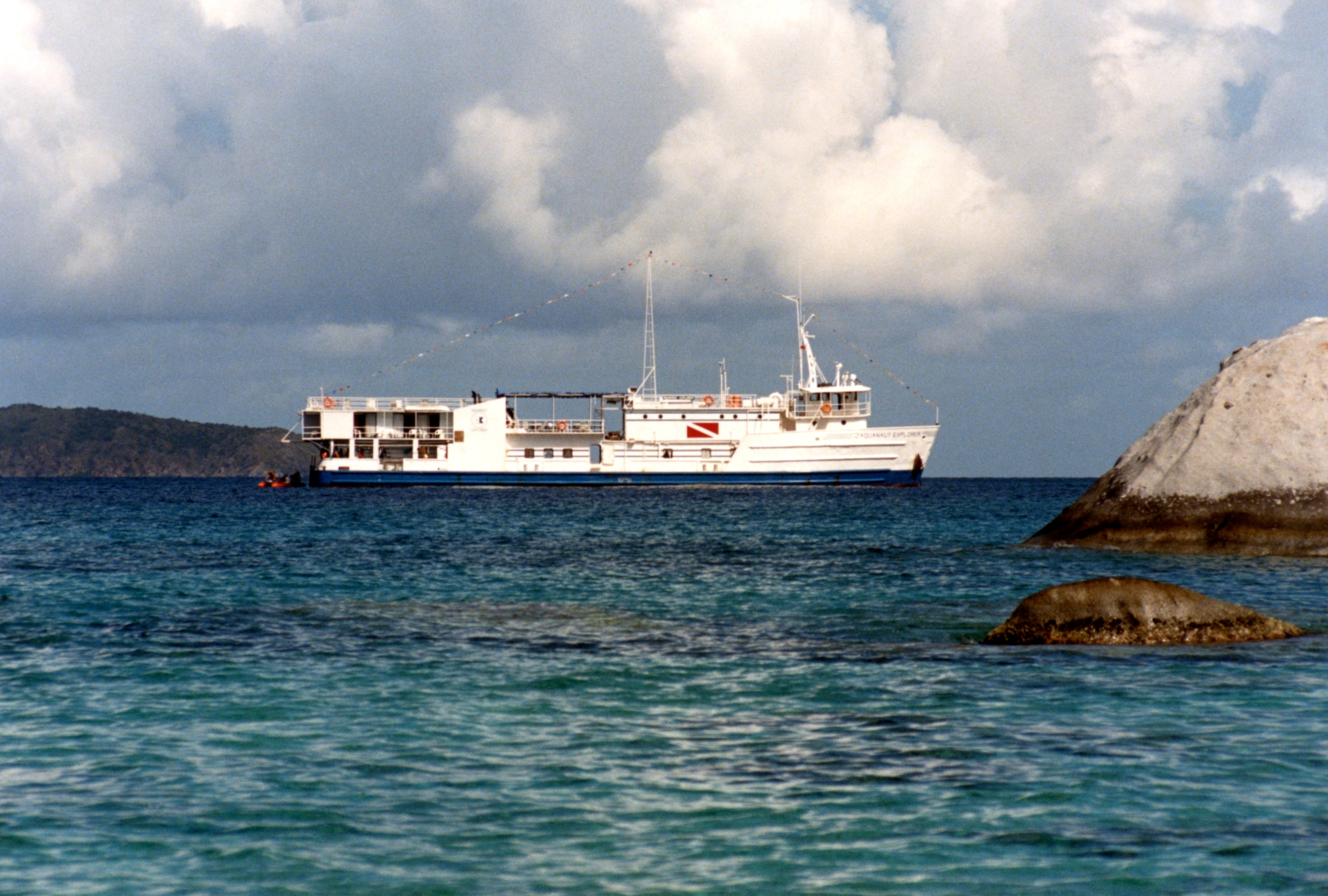
A liveaboard dive boat at anchor in the Virgin Islands

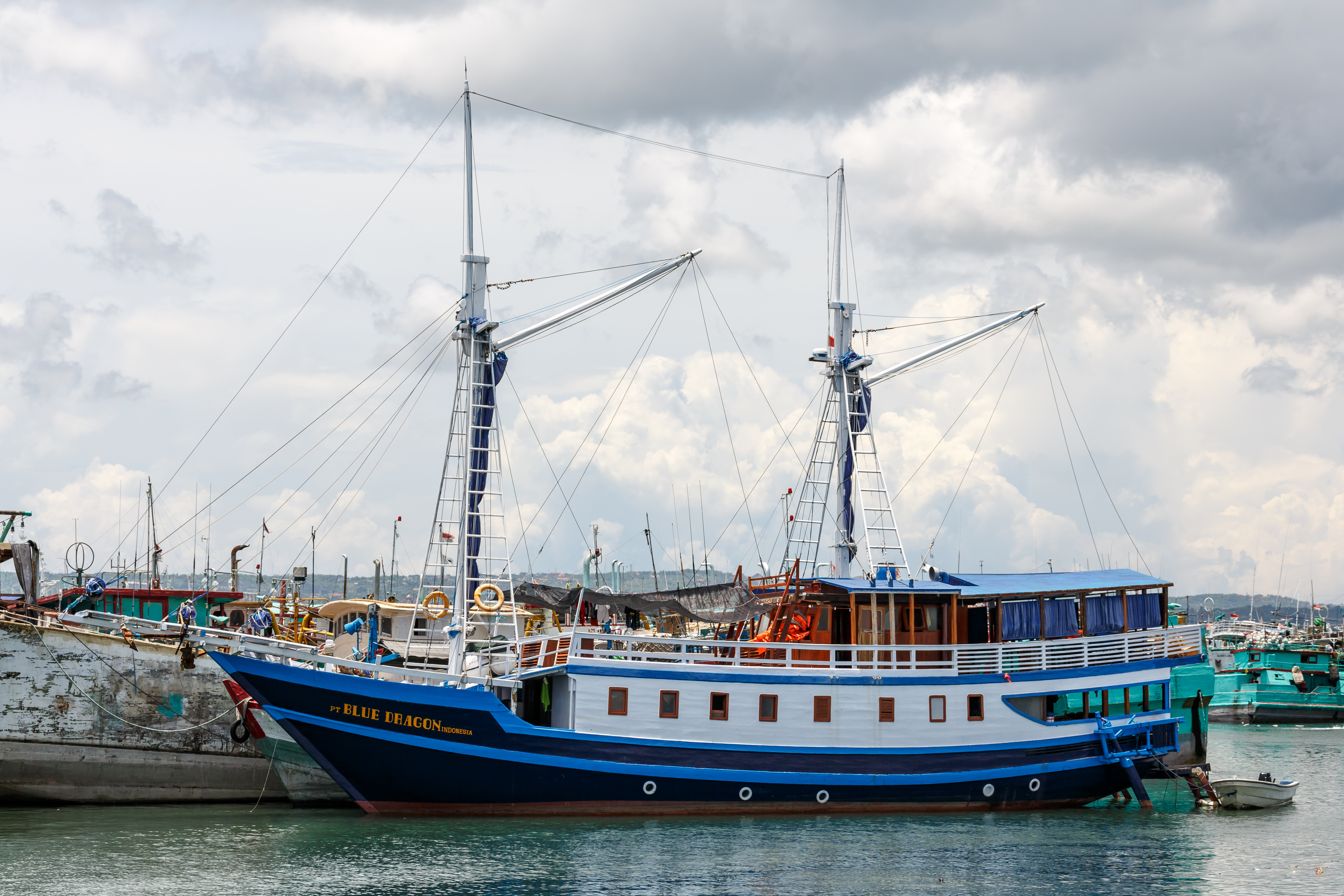
Liveaboard dive boat PT Blue Dragon at Benoa, Bali, Indonesia

On these commercially operated boats, the divers live and sleep on board and dive from the boat for periods of a few days to several weeks. A professional crew navigate and operate the boat. In addition to the usual domestic facilities expected by hotel guests, the boat will have a diving air compressor and emergency oxygen. Some have gas blending facilities and a few even carry a recompression chamber.

The divers enter the water by stepping off a dive platform or the side of the main deck, and return to the boat using a ladder or a mechanical lift platform. Divers may also transfer to and from the dive site in a tender which is carried on, and launched from, the liveaboard boat.

Liveaboards used on the West Coast of Thailand and in the Red Sea tend to be up to 100 feet (30 m) long and have:

- The engine and stores compartments.
- The lower deck, which is mostly cabins for the passengers, usually two passengers per cabin.
- At the stern, a diving platform with diving ladders.
- The main deck, with dining/social room, crew cabins, the bridge, and open space for preparation and storage of dive gear.
- One or two superstructure decks.

The size of a liveaboard can vary considerably, based mainly on the number of passengers carried, the quality of accommodations provided, special equipment carried, and legal constraints for registration.

=== Diving support vessels ===
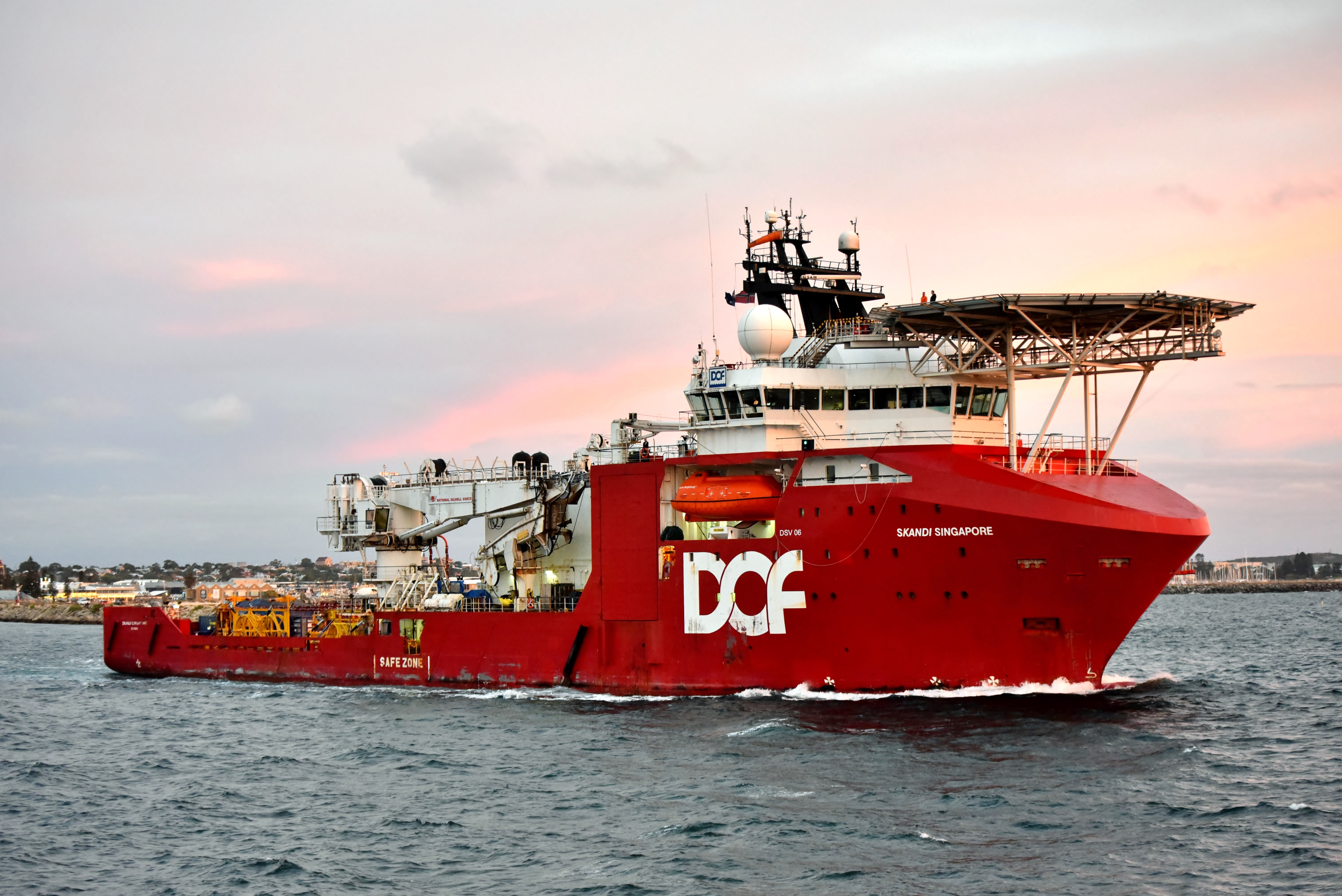
CSV Skandi Singapore departing Fremantle, Australia

A diving support vessel is a ship that is used as a floating base for professional diving projects. They are not generally classified as dive boats but share the basic purpose of transporting divers and giving them access to the water at the dive site. Basic requirements are the ability to keep station accurately and reliably throughout a diving operation, often in close proximity to drilling or production platforms, for positioning to degrade slowly enough in deteriorating conditions to recover divers without excessive risk, and to carry the necessary support equipment for the mode of diving to be used.

Recent offshore diving support vessels tend to be dynamically positioned (DP) and often have additional functions. DP makes a wider range of operations possible, but the platform presents some inherent hazards, particularly the thrusters, making launch and recovery by diving bell widespread. DSVs for inshore operations tend to be much smaller, and may operate while moored for shallow work. Live-boat operations are considered unacceptably hazardous for surface supplied diving unless a stage or bell is used to keep the divers' umbilicals clear of the vessel's thrusters.

=== Others ===
Boats intended for other purposes can usually be used as dive platforms provided that there is reasonably convenient access to the water and enough space to carry the necessary equipment. Auxiliary sailing yachts and motor yachts are often used by their owners as dive boats, and catamarans can be particularly amenable to this function as they often have spacious decks and stern boarding facilities with swim ladders.

== Dive boat features ==
Features that make a boat suitable for use by divers are:

- Sufficient space and stability to carry the divers and their equipment.
- Safe stowage for equipment during transit.
- Facilities for the divers to enter the water from the boat and board the boat from in the water.

Basic marine safety equipment for the class of vessel will be required by regional or national legislation, and diving specific safety equipment may also be carried as required by legislation or the diver certification agency to which the boat operator is affiliated. This will usually include:

Basic marine safety equipment:

- marine VHF radio
- small craft emergency equipment - life jackets, flares, fire extinguishers and other equipment according to the size and operating range of the boat.

Diving safety equipment:

- oxygen first aid equipment.
- diving first aid equipment.
- diving shot, line, and buoy.
- a signal flag to indicate that divers are in the water.
- where necessary, equipment to bring an incapacitated diver on board.

On larger boats additional diving support facilities may also be present:

- high pressure diving air compressor
- gas blending panel
- recompression chamber
- chase boat, or tender, to recover divers who surface away from the anchored vessel

=== Access facilities ===
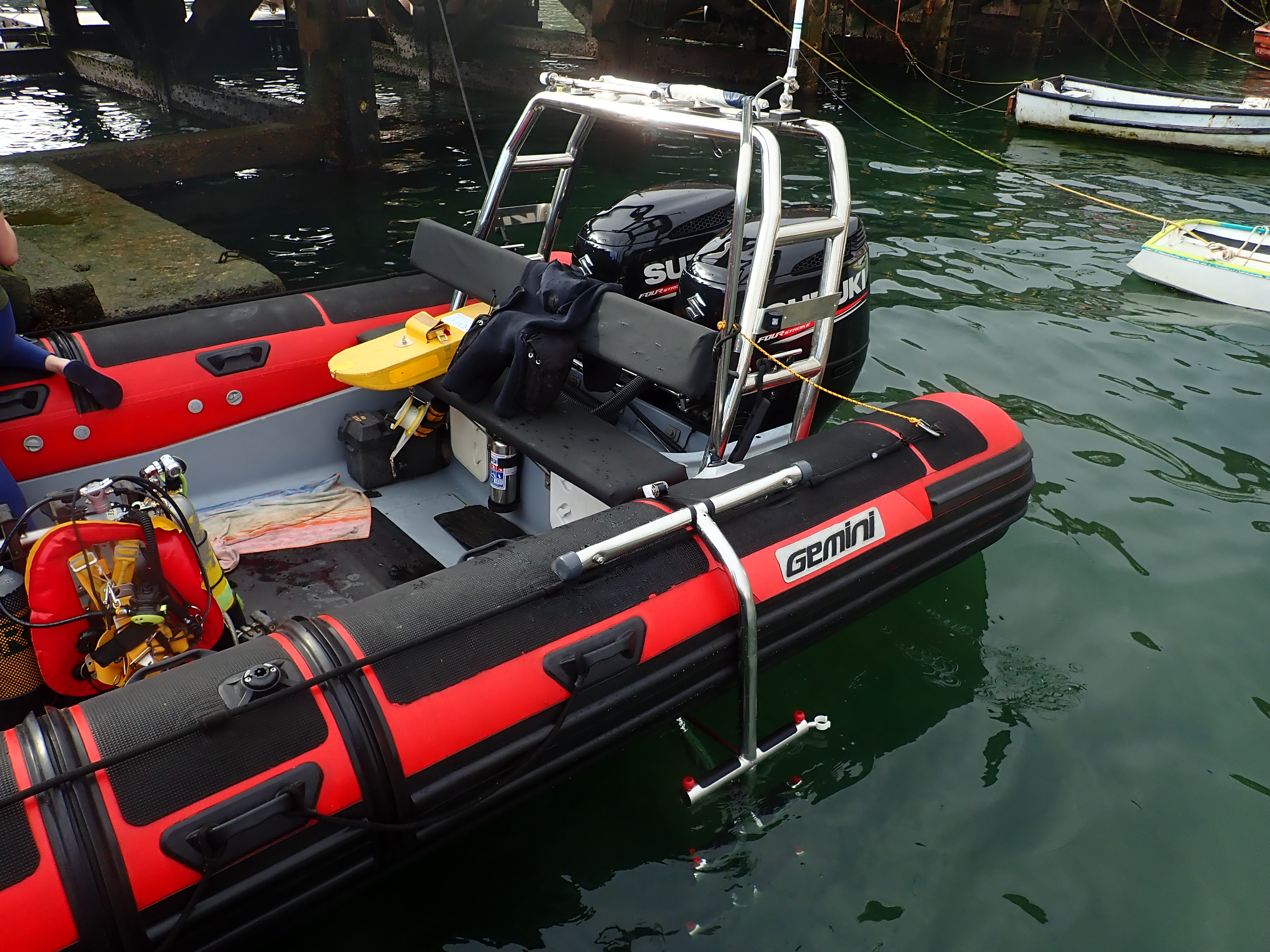
Christmas tree style diver's boarding ladder

If the freeboard of the boat is too high for the divers to climb back on board unaided, a ladder or other aid must be provided. Boarding aids range in cost, complexity, safety, and ease of use, from a boarding stirrup or a rope ladder, through rigid ladders and stairs with handrails, christmas tree ladders which allow the diver to climb while wearing fins, to temporary and fixed stern dive platforms, lifting platforms, diver lifts, and passerelles.

==== Diver lifts ====
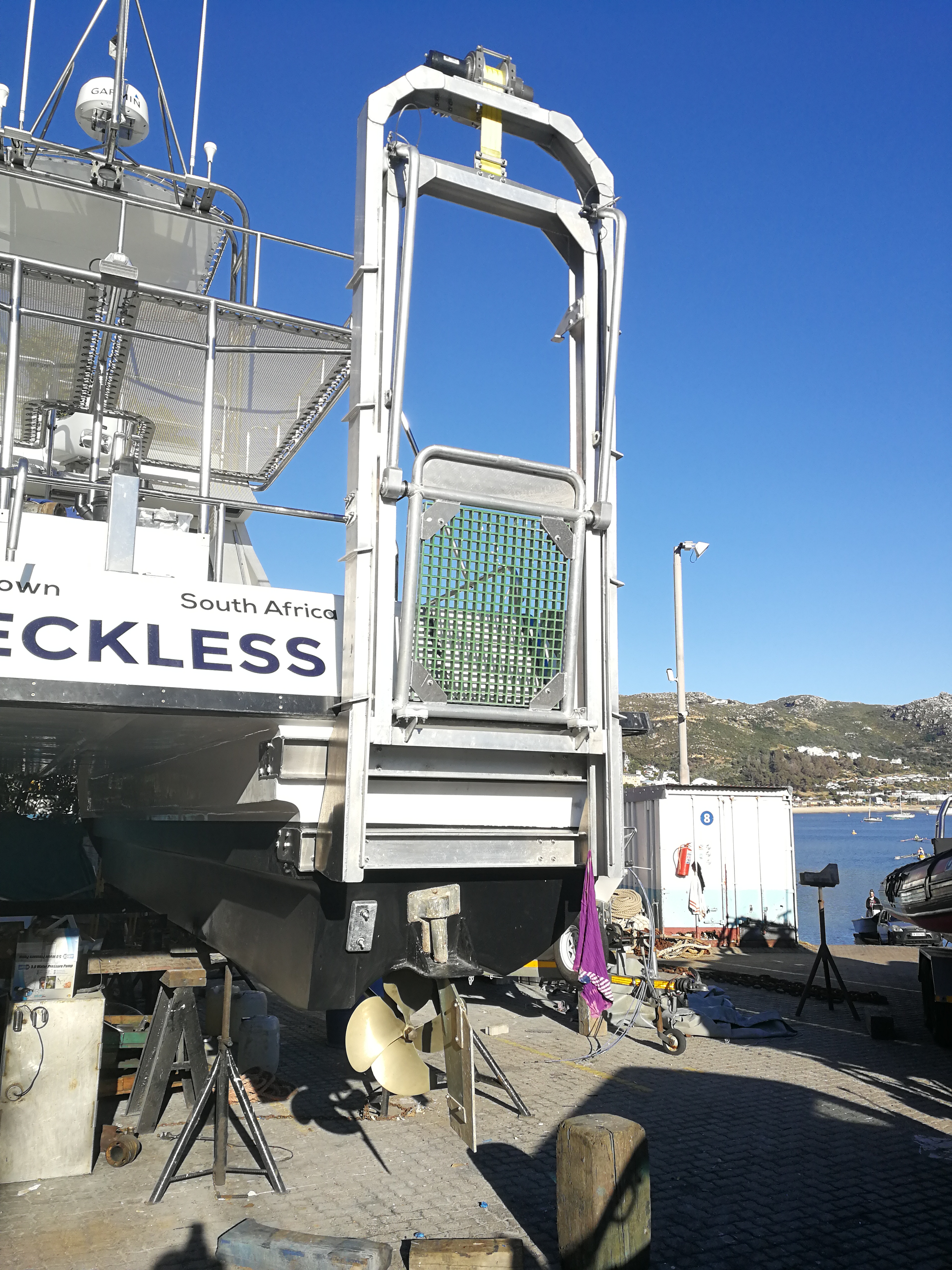
Electric diver lift in aluminium on Cape Town dive boat Wreckless II

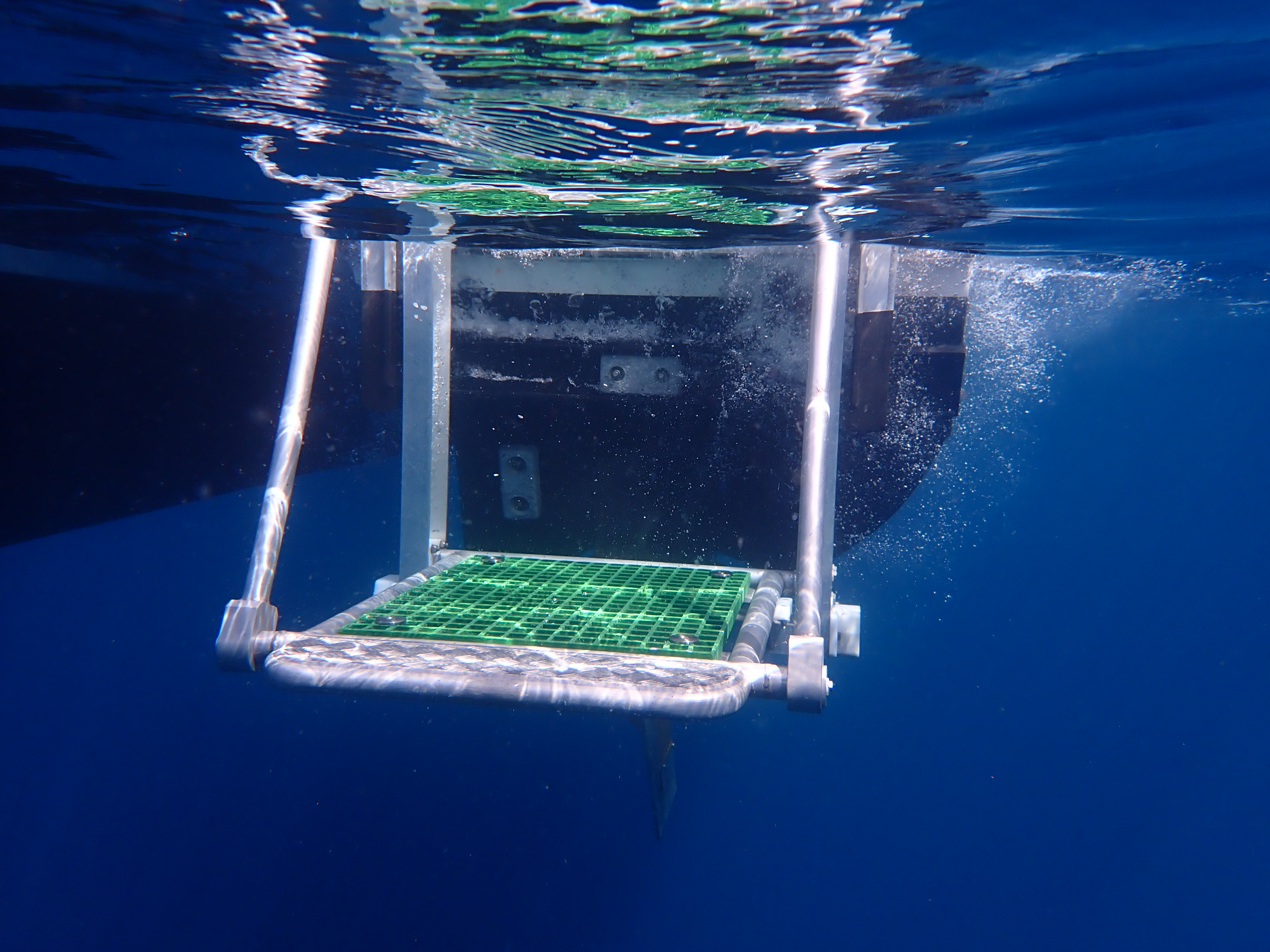
Lowering the lift

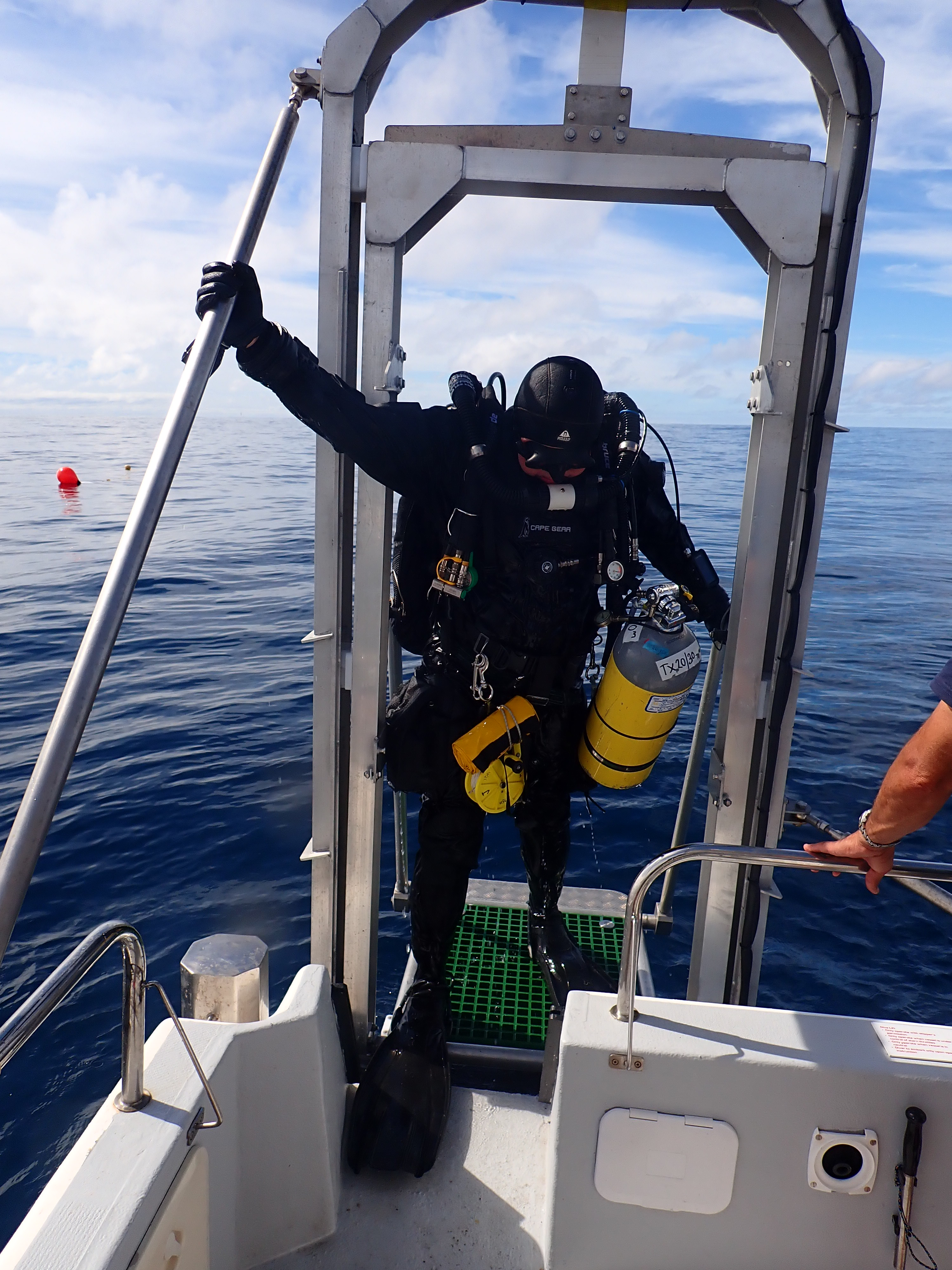
Diver boarding from the lift

A diver lift is a platform which is lowered into the water on which the diver stands while being lifted up to deck level. The lift mechanism constrains sideways motions of the platform, and has sufficient hand-holds for the diver to stand securely during lifting. A lift may also be used to lower a diver into the water. In most cases the lift will be suitable for transporting a fully kitted diver in a standing position, but in special cases seating may be provided. It differs from a diving stage or basket, which is lowered to diving depth, as a lift generally can only be lowered deep enough to stand up after swimming over the platform, which for most divers will be between 1 and 1.5 metres (3.3 and 4.9 ft). The lifting platform should have enough space to stand wearing fins, and there should be suitable handholds to allow the diver to be stable during lifting and lowering with a low risk of getting equipment or body parts in pinch points. The space allowed for walking between platform and boat should take into account the equipment likely to be carried by the diver, such as side mounted cylinders.

== Dive boat operations ==
Procedures for diving from a boat vary depending on the boat, the diving equipment, the dive site and the dive plan.

=== Stowage of dive gear ===
Trim and stability of small boats can be significantly influenced by where and how the dive gear is stowed. When transiting a surf line, or in other rough sea conditions, the movement of the boat can cause poorly secured equipment to move, which can directly injure the occupants, and adversely affect trim and stability, and thereby the safety of the vessel and its occupants. Dedicated dive boats usually provide cylinder racks to stow the scuba sets, and may also provide bins or racks to stow other heavy equipment. Larger vessels, particularly liveaboards, may also provide a camera table and fresh water rinsing facilities for washing gear after the dive.

=== Deployment of divers ===
Divers will usually enter the water with positive buoyancy, as this allows them to make final surface checks, signal to the boat that they are OK and co-ordinate descent with a buddy, but there are occasions when negative buoyancy entries are chosen to avoid excessive drift in a strong current, in which case all pre-dive checks must be done on the boat, the buoyancy compensator, and where applicable, the dry-suit emptied of gas, and the breathing apparatus function thoroughly checked before entering the water. The risk of injury if there is an equipment problem is greater for negative entry, particularly with breathing gas failures.

==== Water entry ====
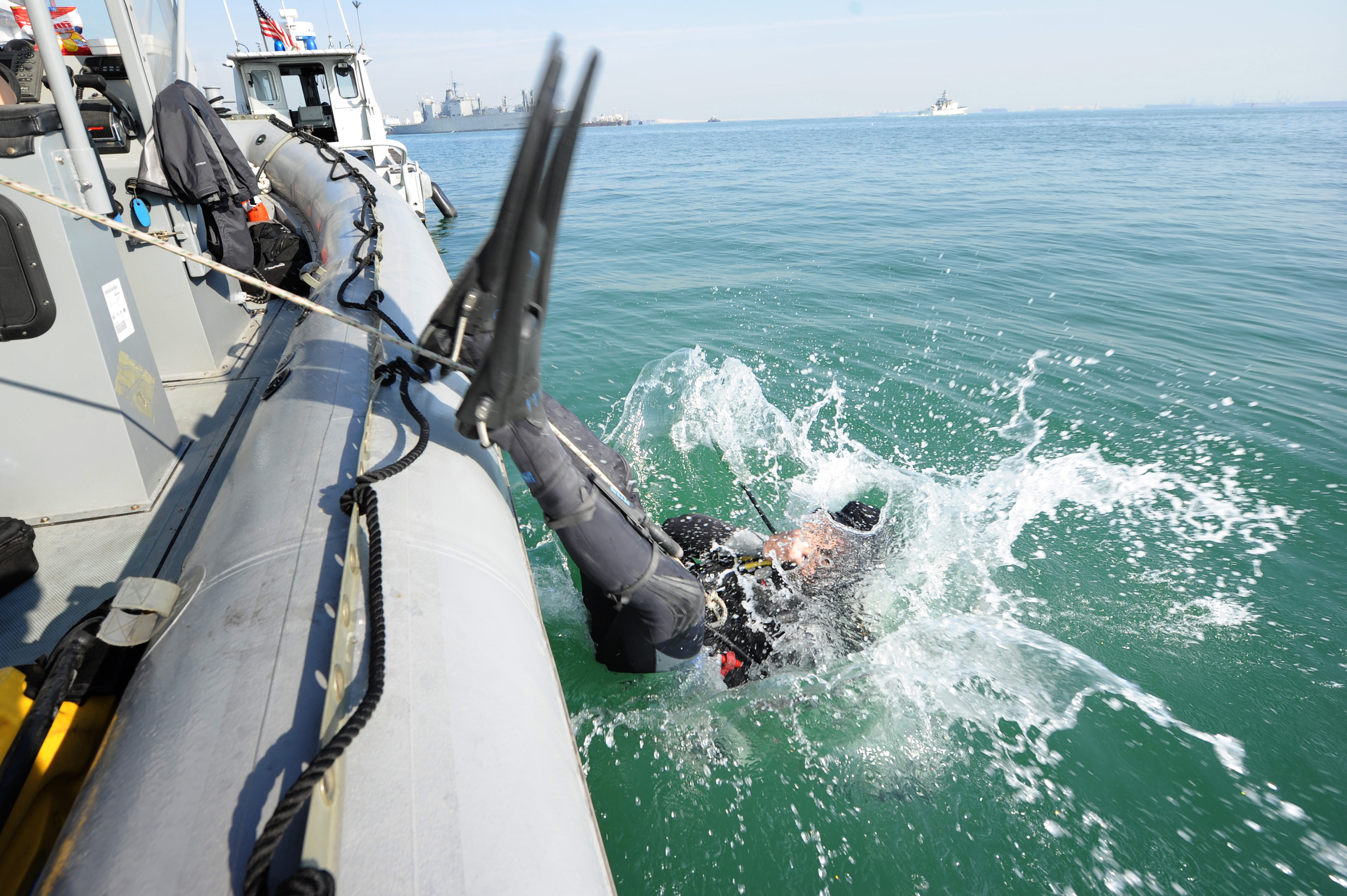
US Navy diver entering the water by backward roll from a RHIB

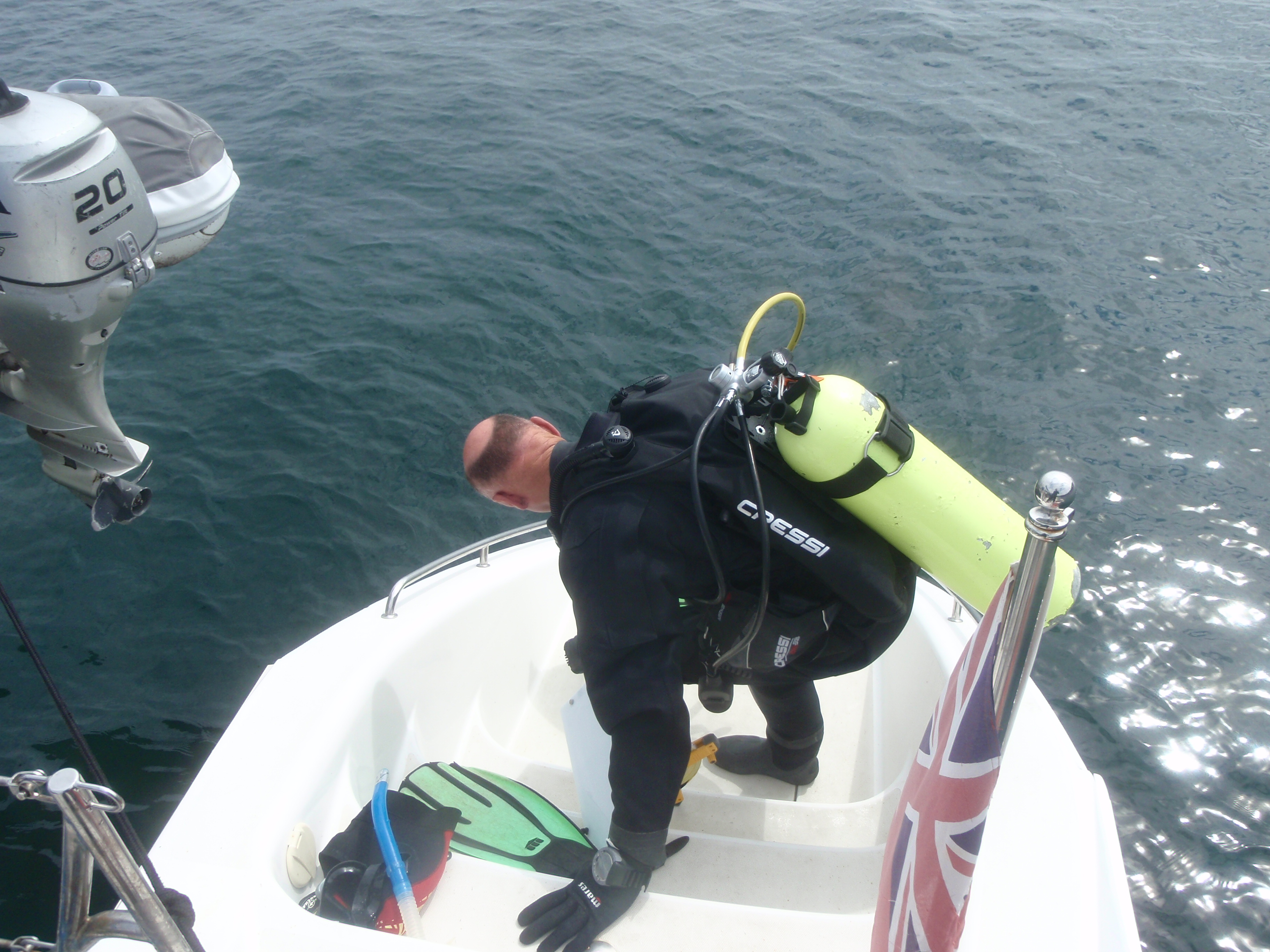
Preparing to dive from a small stern platform on a sailing catamaran.

Several techniques are used for water entry from boats, depending on the layout of the vessel, particularly the freeboard at the entry points. Large dive boats often have a permanent or folding platform at the stern just above the water, intended to make water entry and exit safer and more convenient for divers. Such platforms will usually be provided with steps or ladders from the deck, and folding ladders into the water.

- Backward roll: The diver sits on the gunwale or RHIB tube facing into the boat, and falls in backwards. Suitable for open boats with low sides.
- Forward roll is suitable for boats with low deck freeboard and no gunwale or railing.
- Stride entry is suitable for boats with low or moderately low deck freeboard and no gunwale or railing at the entry point.
- Vertical drop is suitable for boats with moderate to high deck freeboard and no gunwale or railing at the entry point.
- Silent entry, suitable for boat with very low deck freeboard and no gunwale or railing.
- Ladder entry may be used where there is a ladder into the water. Ladders may be fixed, folding or portable, and may be designed for use with swimfins.
- Lifting platform entry: The diver/s stand on a platform fixed to the boat by the lifting mechanism, and are lowered a short distance into the water.
- Stage launch: The diver/s stand on a platform called a diving stage or basket, which can be lowered by a cable to a considerable distance below the surface.

=== Monitoring and escorting the divers ===
If there is no current, and the divers are visiting a small site and can surface on the shot-line or anchor line, keeping track is nominally simple if all goes to plan, as they will surface at a predictable position which is marked. This is not always the case, and for some dives they will surface away from the marker even when the plan is followed precisely. In other cases divers will not make it back to the shot-line and have to surface independently. If the dive boat is anchored and the plan is for the divers to ascend on the anchor line, it may be necessary to have a tender or chase boat available to follow and pick up divers surfacing off the mark.

One system common with recreational divers is for one of the divers in each group to deploy a delayed surface marker buoy (DSMB), also known as a decompression buoy, at the end of the dive. This serves to notify the boat that divers are surfacing, and where they are. It also warns other vessels to keep clear of divers in the water.

A group of divers drift diving together will often follow a dive leader who tows a surface marker buoy (SMB) throughout the dive. This allows the boat to follow the group effectively in most conditions. If any of the divers need to surface early they can ascend on the SMB line, and surface at the buoy, which is where they will be most easily seen by the boat crew. If anyone is separated from the group they can deploy a DSMB to notify the boat that they will be surfacing away from the float.

=== Recovery of divers ===
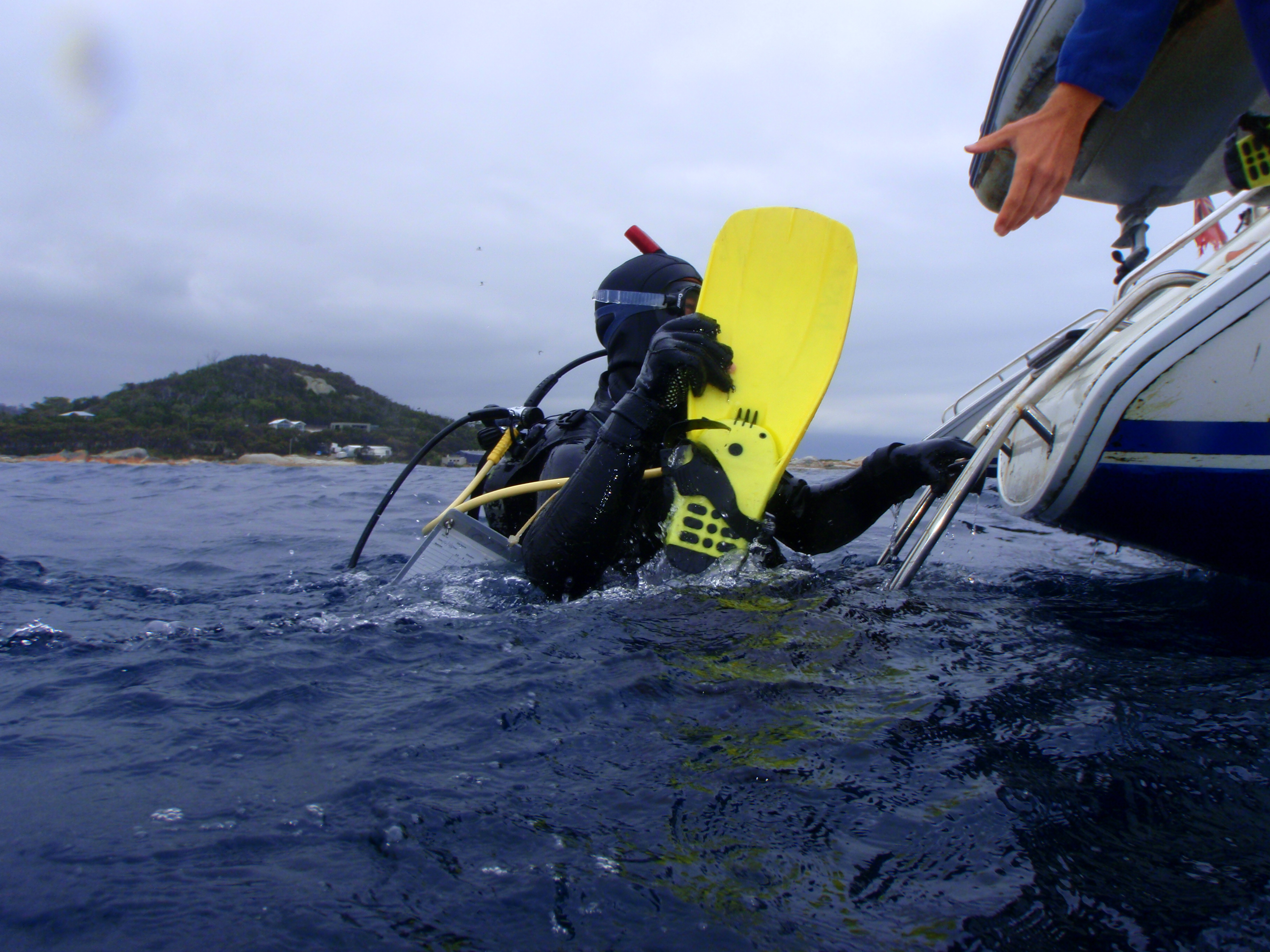
Exiting water by stern platform ladder on a sailing catamaran

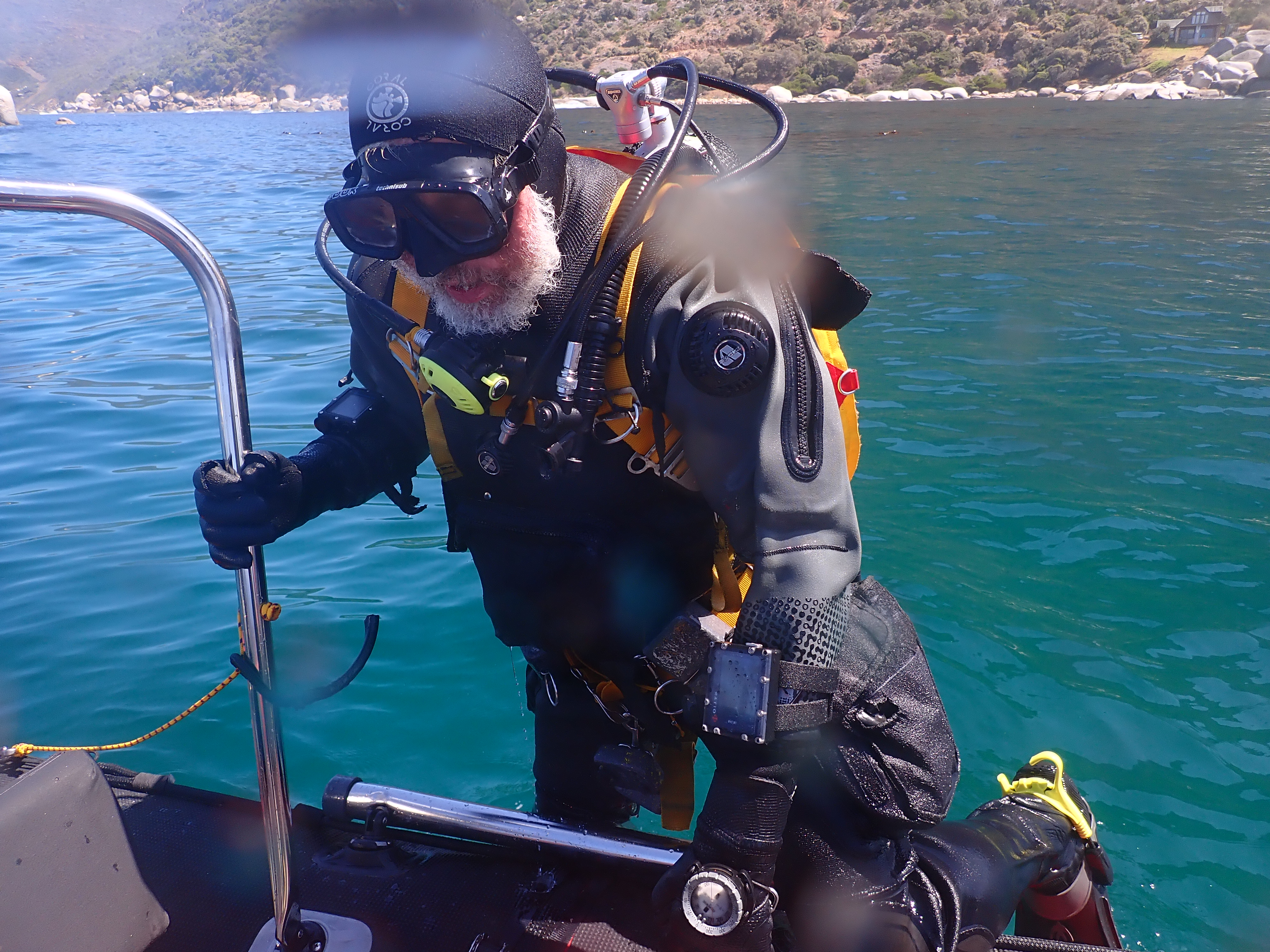
Diver boarding using ladder on RIB

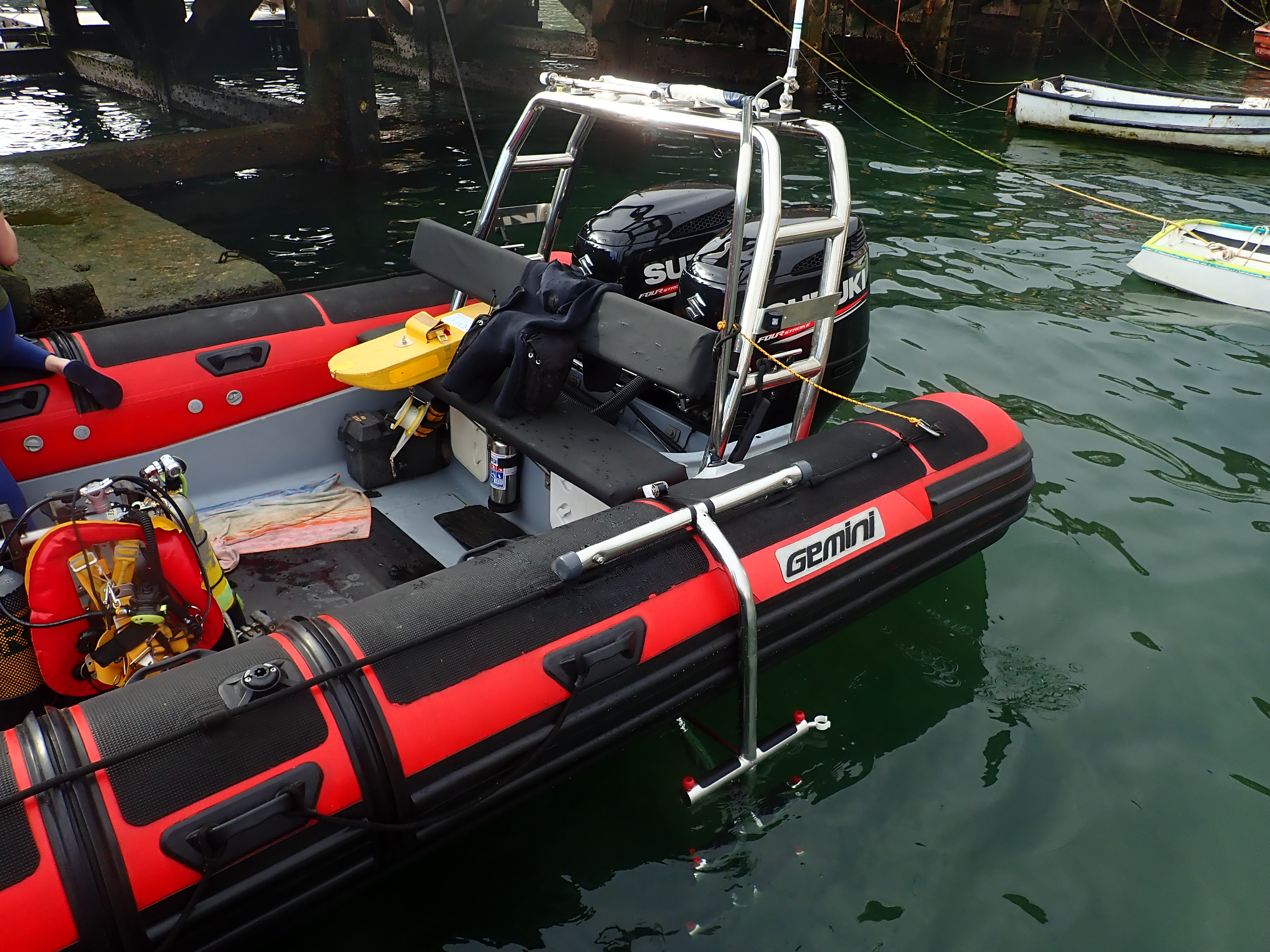
Dive boat ladder deployed on RIB

Divers may be picked up by a small tender or the dive boat may have a low enough freeboard for divers to climb over the side unaided, or with a bit of assistance from the crew. In this case it is usual to pass up heavy equipment such as weightbelts, and leave on the fins to help boost the diver out of the water. This is easiest with inflatable boats, particularly if provided with conveniently sited handles or ropes along the sides. For higher freeboards and easier boarding, mechanical aids may be provided:

- Ladders may be provided for boarding from the water.It is easier to climb a standard ladder or stairs if fins are removed first. They can be handed up to an attendant on the boat, clipped to the diver's harness, or carried by sliding the fin straps over the forearm. Christmas tree ladders can be climbed with the fins on the feet, and should stand off the side of the boat far enough for the fins to have clearance.
- Stern and side platforms may be used in conjunction with ladders or low freeboard decks.
- Passerelles or gangways are ramps which are lowered at one end to provide a path to walk from the deck to a dock or tender, and can also be used to walk to the water level.
- Diver lifts are platforms attached to the boat on which the diver stands while being lifted to deck level or lowered a short distance into the water.
- Stages and baskets are platforms which are lowered into and under the water and are hoisted back on board with the diver or divers standing on them. They are not attached to the boat except by the lifting cable.
- Boarding stirrups can be used on low freeboard boats, particularly rigid hull inflatables. They are straps with a loop, rung or hook at the lower end attached to the side of the boat. The standard versions require a fin to be removed to get the foot into the stirrup, and have a fixed length, which can be awkward to use as the stirrup may be uncomfortably high for a tall person if at the right height for a short person. Adjustable versions allow the diver to clip the loop around the foot with the fin in place, then the loop can be raised to the preferred height after fitting. Open sided rigid "hook" stirrups allow the foot to be positioned on a rigid stirrup without removing the fin. Stirrup steps have the same ergonomic disadvantages as rope ladders: they swing freely under load.
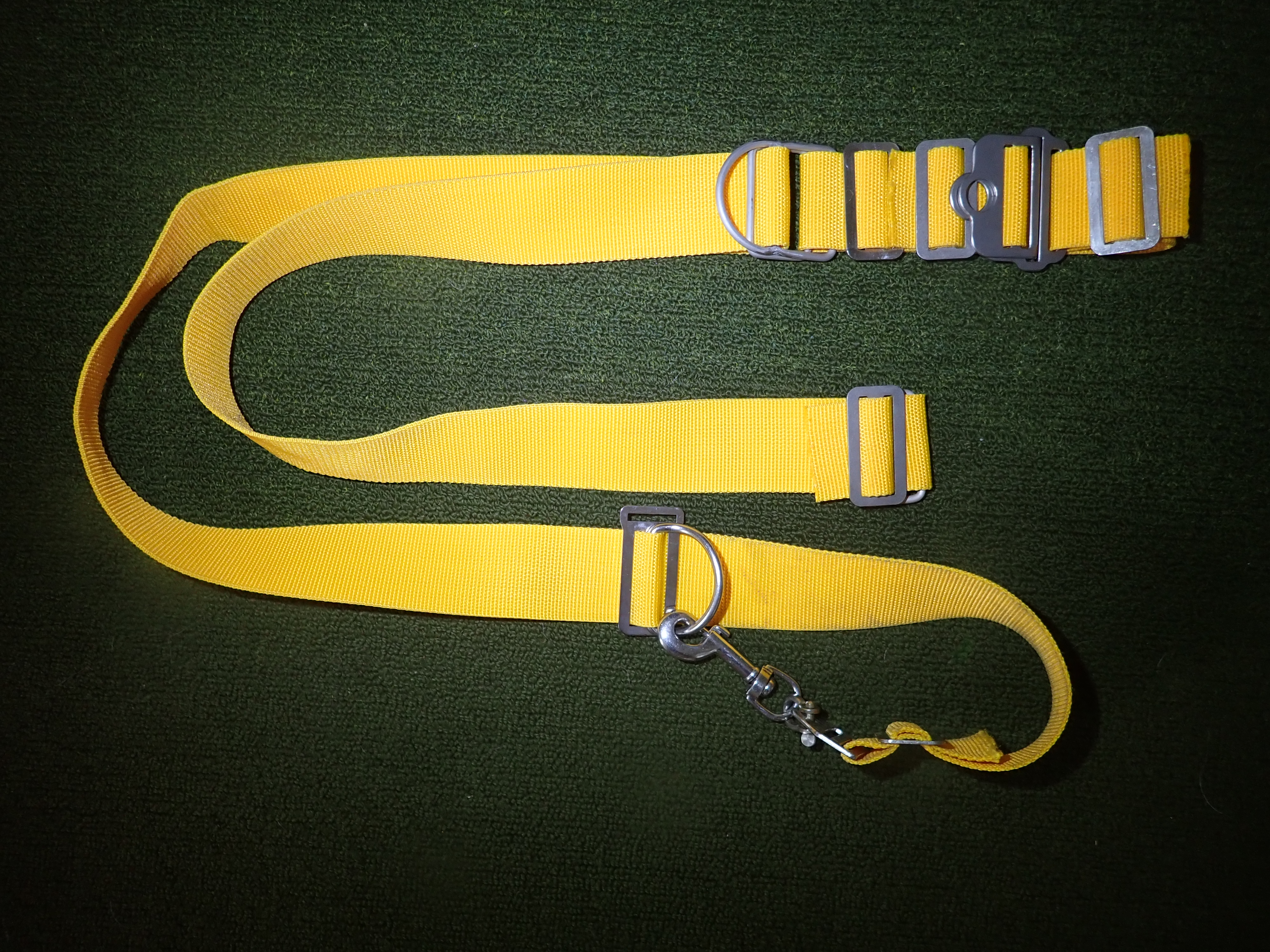
Adjustable boarding stirrup

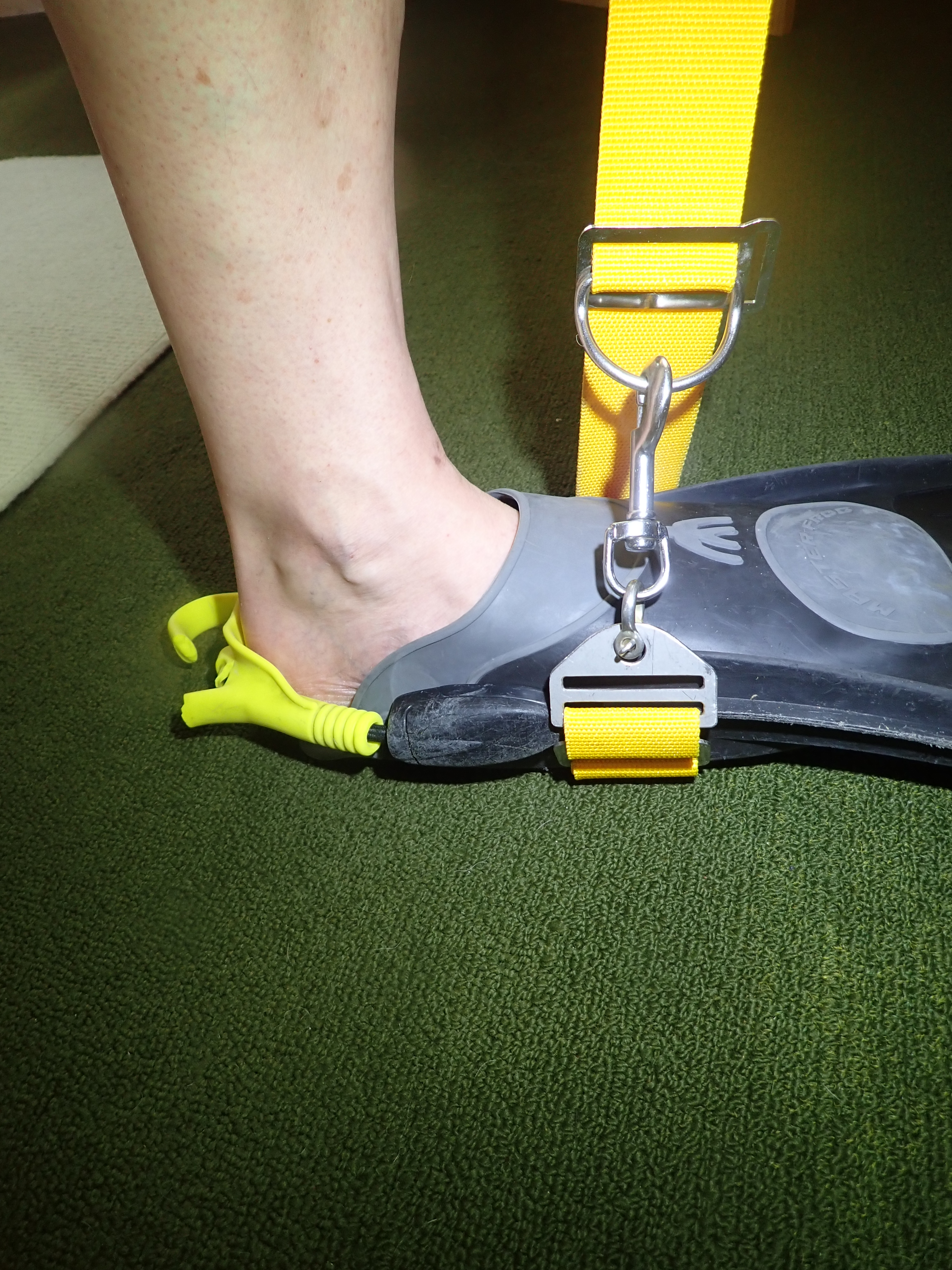
Foot loop detail

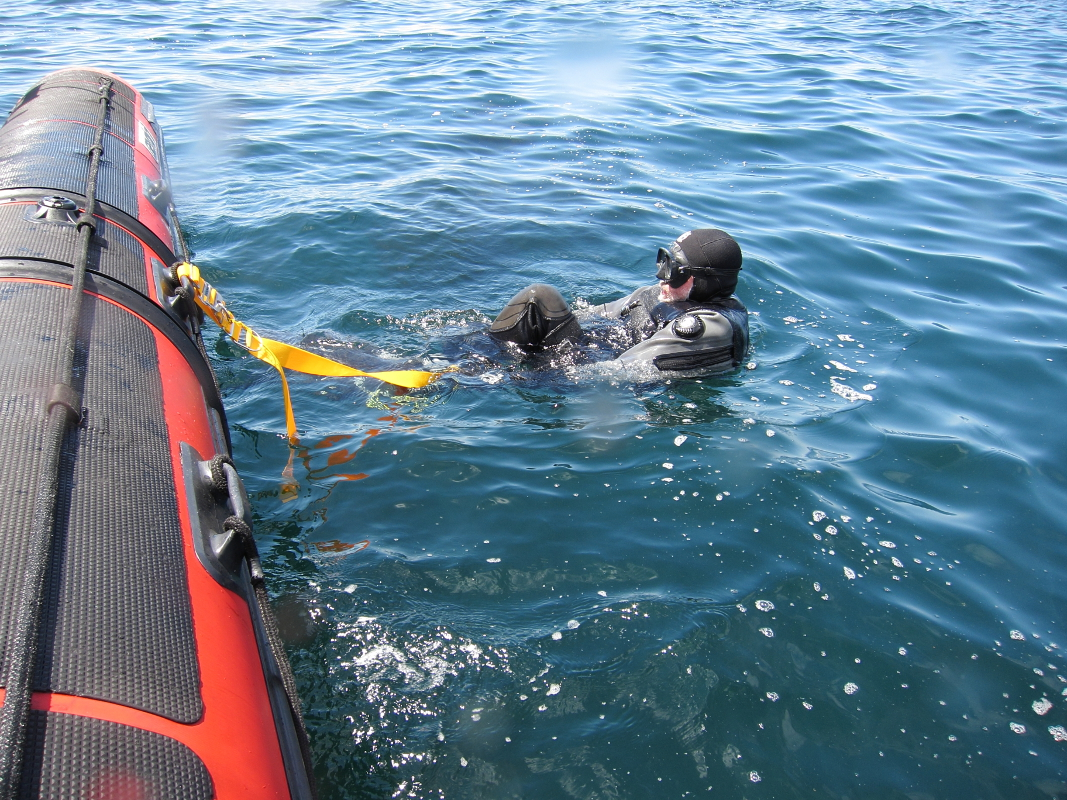
Fit loop

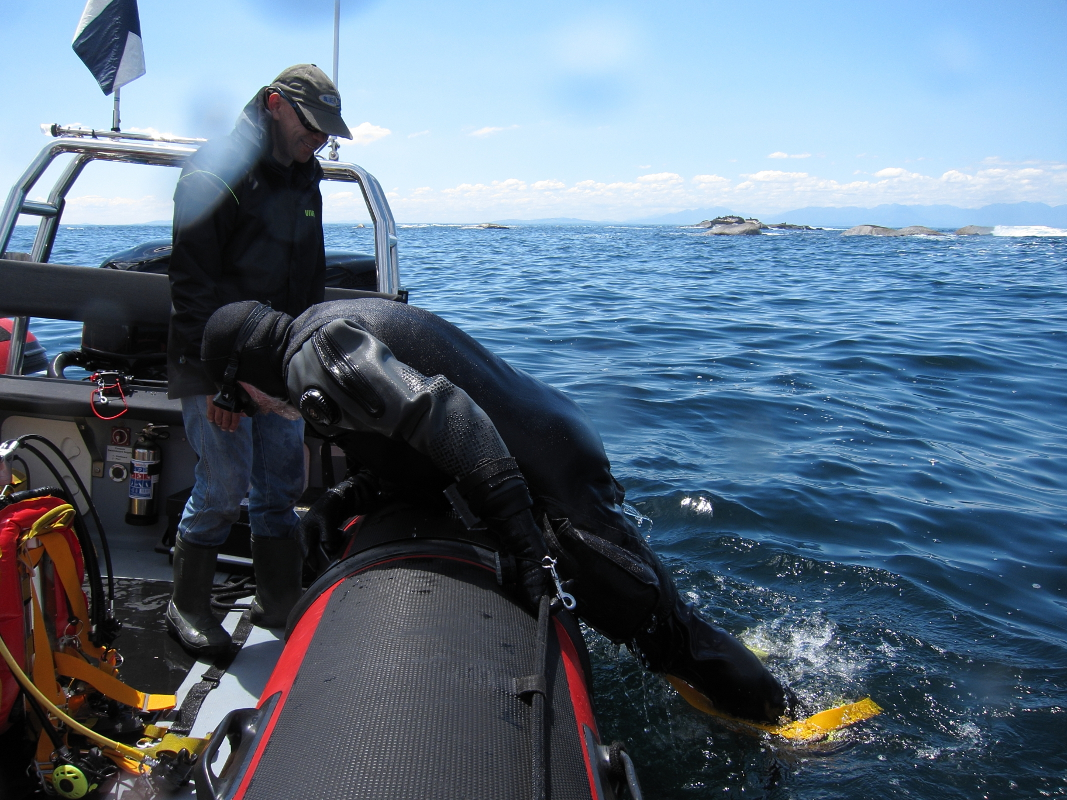
Push up

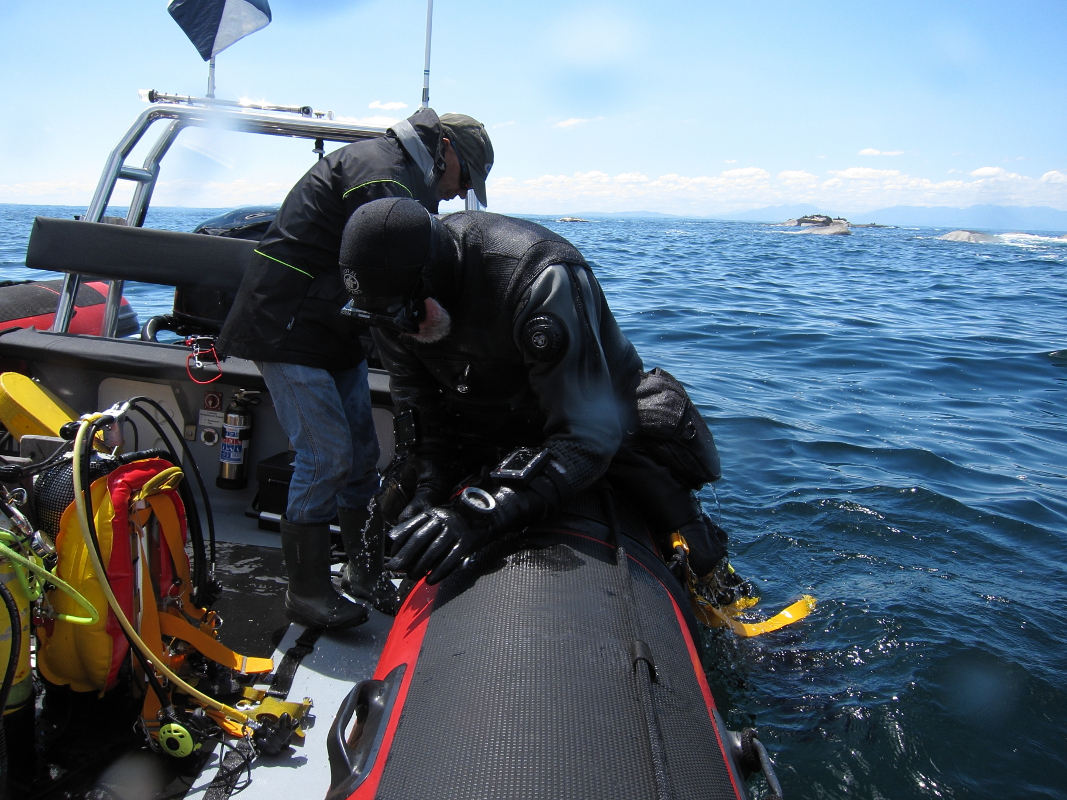
Swing onto boat

=== Boat diving hazards ===
- Run down by boat (the dive boat or any other passing by)
- Cut by propeller (the dive boat or any other passing by)
- Left behind in the sea after the dive
- Seasickness
- Another diver landing on top during entry. This can happen when divers do a group backward roll over the side of a boat, and do not all go in together. Anyone rolling late may land on top of someone already in the water. It can also happen when entries are from the same point and a diver does not ensure that the water is clear to enter.
- Falling overboard in transit, particularly when crossing a surf line after a beach launch in a boat where the seating is along the sides.
- Surfacing far away from boat and cannot be found.
- Surfacing away from an anchored boat and unable to swim back to it against wind or current.
- Hypothermia and wind chill on open boats in cold or windy weather
- Sunburn and overheating on open boats in hot weather

=== Special procedures ===
Some boat diving activities require special procedures to reduce risk or enhance the diving experience.

==== Logging in and out ====
The risk of being left behind by the boat can be controlled by logging divers into and out of the water. If this is done by each diver only for themselves, there is little chance of confusion and error. In other protocols the skipper or divemaster is responsible for ensuring there is a name-list of all divers on board before leaving the shore, and that everyone on the list is back on the boat before leaving the dive site.

==== Use of personal marker ====
Surfacing at the shot-line, group surface marker, or personal marker buoy increases the visibility of a diver, and reduces the risk of not being noticed by a passing vessel. This will reduce the risks both of being run down and of being lost at the surface. It also provides an additional flotation device in case of fatigue.

==== Signalling the boat ====
If the boat cannot see a diver at the surface, the diver can use several methods to be more visible, and once seen, can indicate to the boat whether they are in difficulty or not.

==== Diving from an anchored boat ====
When using the anchor line to control ascents and descents, a "tag line" (or "lead line") may be used between the anchor line and the stern of the vessel, to allow secure transfer between these points in a current. A floating "drift line" (also "tag line", "current line" or "trail line") may be streamed from the stern or boarding platform to assist divers who drift astern of the vessel, and for something to hold onto while waiting to use the ladder. They can either hold onto the line and be pulled in by the crew, or pull themselves along the line. The far end of the line is usually marked with a brightly coloured buoy to show divers where it is and to help other boats avoid crossing the line. If there is any significant risk of a diver drifting away from the site, the dive boat should either be ready to slip the moorings at short notice, or have a tender in the water. Some skippers will tether the tender behind the dive boat where it can also be used as a drift line. A lazy shot or decompression trapeze may be suspended from the boat near the boarding area, and the drift line may be set up between this and the anchor line to guide decompressing divers ascending on the anchor line to the more convenient facility at the stern for the shallow stops.

==== Live-boating ====
Live-boating is diving from a boat which is not moored. There are increased risks due to the proximity of the divers to propellers when the engines are running, but there are also safety and convenience advantages to having the boat available to move at immediate notice, particularly in currents, as the boat can follow a group of drift divers, and pick up the divers from where they surface in most cases. Live boating is also used where anchoring is prohibited or impracticable.

Live-boat surface-supplied diving exposes the diver to a generally unacceptable risk of injury by the propellers or thrusters if the umbilical length allows the diver to get near the hazard. Deployment by bell or diving stage makes it possible to restrict the length of the umbilical sufficiently to make it impossible for the diver to reach the hazard, or for the umbilical to get snagged or drawn into the moving parts.

==== Decompression stations ====
When a significant amount of decompression is planned by several divers at a site where they can reasonably expect to surface on the shotline, they may consider deploying a decompression trapeze. This keeps the divers together where it is easier to monitor them and provide support for the last part of the dive. A decompression trapeze can also be dropped by the boat for a group of divers by pre-arranged signal, such as a second decompression buoy at the group.

==== Drift diving ====
Drift diving occurs when the divers allow themselves to be conveyed past the bottom by the prevailing current, minimising the effort required to cover a relatively large distance, but moving the divers away from the start position and making their surfacing position uncertain. The usual way of monitoring the position of a group is by the lead diver towing a surface marker buoy, and the divers of the group all following the dive leader. The dive boat follows the buoy at a distance where the lookouts can see if any diver surfaces near the buoy. Divers from the group either surface along the buoy line, or if there is vertical current shear or they are separated from the group, deploy their own DSMB and surface on that. Groups of inexperienced divers may be escorted by a second divemaster who tries to keep them together, directs stragglers back to the dive leader, and keeps track of remaining gas. Divers may be formally grouped in buddy pairs, surfacing together when the first is low on gas, or more informally, and rely on the divemasters if they have a problem.

==== Wreck diving ====
A major consideration of wreck diving is finding the wreck and getting the divers to the wreck with the minimum risk of getting lost. There are several methods for getting the divers to the wreck. The preferred method will depend on local conditions. In low visibility hooking onto the wreck is a reliable way of ensuring the divers will find it, but this procedure requires a wreck that is structurally suitable for snagging with a grapnel or anchor. A shotline which can be dropped off the wreckage is less likely to damage the wreck or become snagged and difficult to retrieve, but this requires appropriate visibility for the divers to be sure of finding the wreckage. When it is important to get back to the shotline for ascent, it may be tied to the wreckage by the first divers on site using a guide-line, which is retrieved by the last divers to leave. When there is a strong current, it may be necessary to drop in from up-current, a technique sometimes known as "parachuting in" or "free drop". The wreck may be first marked with a shotline, if this is considered useful or necessary. Divers may surface on the shotline, anchorline or personal DSMB depending on the conditions. When live-boating there are alternative methods for descent, including free drop and descent on the shotline.

An upline(or Jersey upline) may be used to limit drift during ascent. This is a fairly substantial natural fibre rope which is deployed from the bottom using a small lift bag to provide the equivalent of a shotline. The lower end is tied off to the bottom, usually on a wreck, and the diver ascends on the line to avoid being swept away from the site by currents. After reaching the surface, the last diver cuts the line and it sinks back down, Natural fibre is used so the line rots away over a few years.

==== Towing a diver ====
Occasionally a diver may be towed using a "sled", an unpowered device towed behind a surface vessel which conserves the diver's energy and allows more distance to be covered for a given air consumption and bottom time. The depth is usually controlled by the diver by using diving planes or by tilting the whole sled. Some sleds are faired to reduce drag on the diver.

=== Emergency procedures ===
==== Diver recall ====
There are several ways to recall divers to the surface during a dive. Some are not universally known or immediately obvious, and the chances of them being understood correctly and responded to appropriately are increased if they are specified in the dive briefing.

- Pyrotechnic diver recall devices (Thunderflash) are small explosive devices calibrated to make sufficient noise to alert any divers in the vicinity without significant risk of injury to diver or environment. They have the advantages of being small, compact, and not easily confused with anything else likely to occur during the dive. They have disadvantages of a limited shelf life, and must be transported, stored, used and disposed of according to manufacturer's instructions and legal constraints.
- A surface marker buoy line may be used to signal to the diver below, either by pre-arranged pull signals, or by sending down a weight clipped to the line and carrying a message.
- Underwater loudspeaker and public address (PA) systems produce either a pre-programmed or microphone input sound signal.
- Revving the boat's engines is a popular but notoriously unreliable method, as few divers can distinguish between the sounds of the engines of their support boat and those of any other roughly similar vessel.

==== Lost diver procedures ====
There are three aspects to lost diver procedure:

- Lost buddy procedure, which is similar or identical to the procedure when diving from any other platform, until the diver notifies the boat that a diver is missing.
- Lost diver underwater, and
- Lost diver on the surface.

Generally, since the diver is lost, it is not known whether they are lost underwater or on the surface. Early notification that a diver is missing allows early starting of the search process. If the divers are notified of their expected behaviour during the dive briefing, the chances of timely notification of a problem are improved.

If a diver has not surfaced or returned to the boat when expected or a diver is reported missing by a buddy or dive leader, the diver is considered to be lost unless they have a surface marker buoy deployed. However, the presence of a buoy at the surface is no guarantee that it is connected to the diver.

==== Decompression illness ====
A dive boat will not be carrying a decompression chamber to treat a diver with decompression illness - that would normally classify it as a diving support vessel, so treatment would be limited to oxygen therapy with 100% oxygen, first aid emergency life support and transportation to the nearest suitable medical facility, or for operations where the equipment is available, and the risk is assessed as acceptable, technical or scientific divers may choose to do in-water recompression.

== Operating a dive boat ==
The person in command of a dive boat is generally referred to as the skipper. In most cases the boat is fairly small and will not require many crew members. It is not unusual for the skipper to be the only crew member. There may be national legislation requiring a certificate of competency or license from the person in command of a dive boat. This will generally depend on whether the boat is operated for profit, how many passengers it is licensed to carry and how far offshore it is licensed to operate.

== See also ==
- Canoe and kayak diving – Recreational diving from a canoe or kayak
- Diving support vessel – Ship used as a floating base for professional diving projects
- Liveaboard – Way of using a boat
