= Rim-driven thruster =

Electric propulsion unit for ships

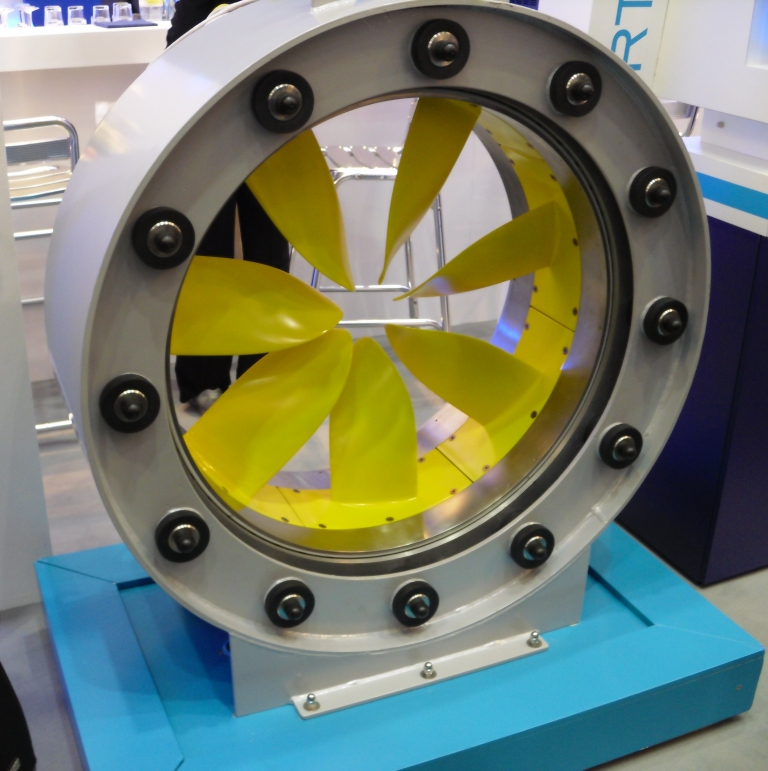
Rim–driven thruster, presented at SMM 2010

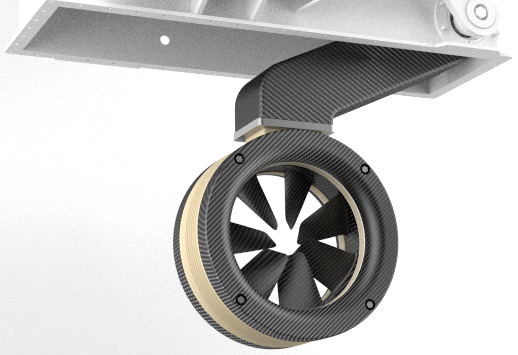
A rim-driven thruster mounted on a swing-out unit (design by silentdynamics GmbH)

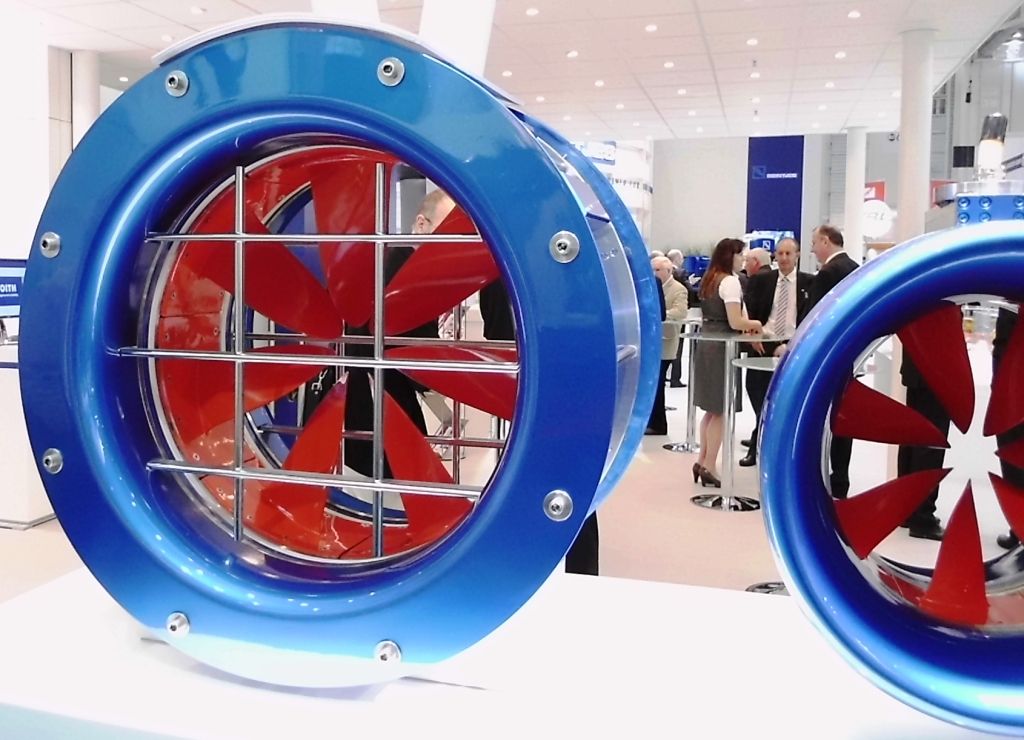
Voith rim thruster at SMM 2010 in Hamburg

The rim-driven thruster, also known as rim-driven propulsor/propeller (or RDP) is a novel type of electric propulsion unit for ships. The concept was proposed by Kort around 1940, but only became commercially practical in the early 21st century due to advances in DC motor controller technology. As of 2017, commercial models of between 500 kW and 3 MW are available from manufacturers such as Rolls-Royce, Schottel, Brunvoll, Baliño, Voith, Van der Velden, etc.

== Principle ==
The rim-driven thruster is a marine propeller that does not use a central hub for transmission of the driving torque. Conventional hubcentric propellers typically use a shaft driven by a turbine, a diesel engine or an electric motor. The more recent podded drives consist of a propeller driven by a conventional electric motor into an azimuthable gondola under water, but they still incorporate a traditional hubcentric propeller.

The blades of the rim-driven thruster, by contrast, are mounted on an outer ring rather than a central hub. The ring constitutes the rotor of an electric motor and sits within a surrounding stator, which is also ring-shaped and creates the necessary torque. Rotor and stator are water tight and the whole unit operates submerged. Similar to an azipod, a rim-driven thruster can be designed to be fixed, retractable and/or azimuthing.

== Advantages and disadvantages ==
The largest advantages of the rim-driven thruster are lower noise emissions, potentially increased efficiency, and a compact design that enables relatively simple integration in many applications. Since the propeller blade/rotor assembly is driven directly by electro-magnetic forces, no shaft and no gearbox is needed. The blades can be made of metal or composite material, and the rotor and stator can be hermetically sealed. Since the blades are mounted to the rotor ring, there is no tip gap (which can be a noise source in ducted propellers) and the elimination of a mechanical gearbox also removes a prominent source of noise.

The primary disadvantage is the complexity of manufacturing high-output submerged motors with water-lubricated bearings. The potential efficiency improvements might also be tricky to achieve due to friction losses in the gap between the rotor and its surrounding stator. And as with all high-output electric motors, sufficient cooling can present problems even for units submerged in water.

== See also ==
- Manoeuvring thruster
- Azimuth thruster
- Azipod
- Z-drive
- Cycloidal drive
- Propulsor
- Reaction control system – Spacecraft thrusters used to provide attitude control and translation
