= Maneuvering thruster =

Transverse or steerable propulsion device in a watercraft

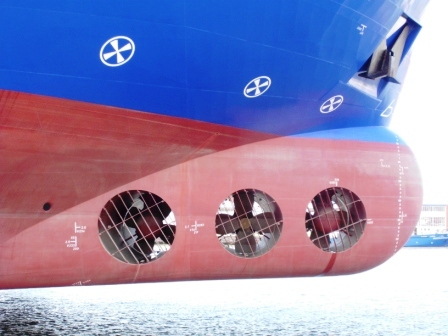
A ship equipped with tunnel thrusters, indicated by the circled "X" markings above the water line

Maneuvering thrusters (bow thrusters and stern thrusters) are transversal propulsion devices built into or mounted to either the bow or stern (front or back, respectively) of a ship or boat to make it more manoeuvrable. Bow thrusters make docking easier, since they allow the captain to turn the vessel to port or starboard side, without using the main propulsion mechanism which requires some forward motion for turning; The effectiveness of a thruster is curtailed by any forward motion due to the Coandă effect. A stern thruster is of the same principle, fitted at the stern. Sufficiently large vessels often have multiple bow thrusters and stern thrusters.

== Tunnel thrusters ==
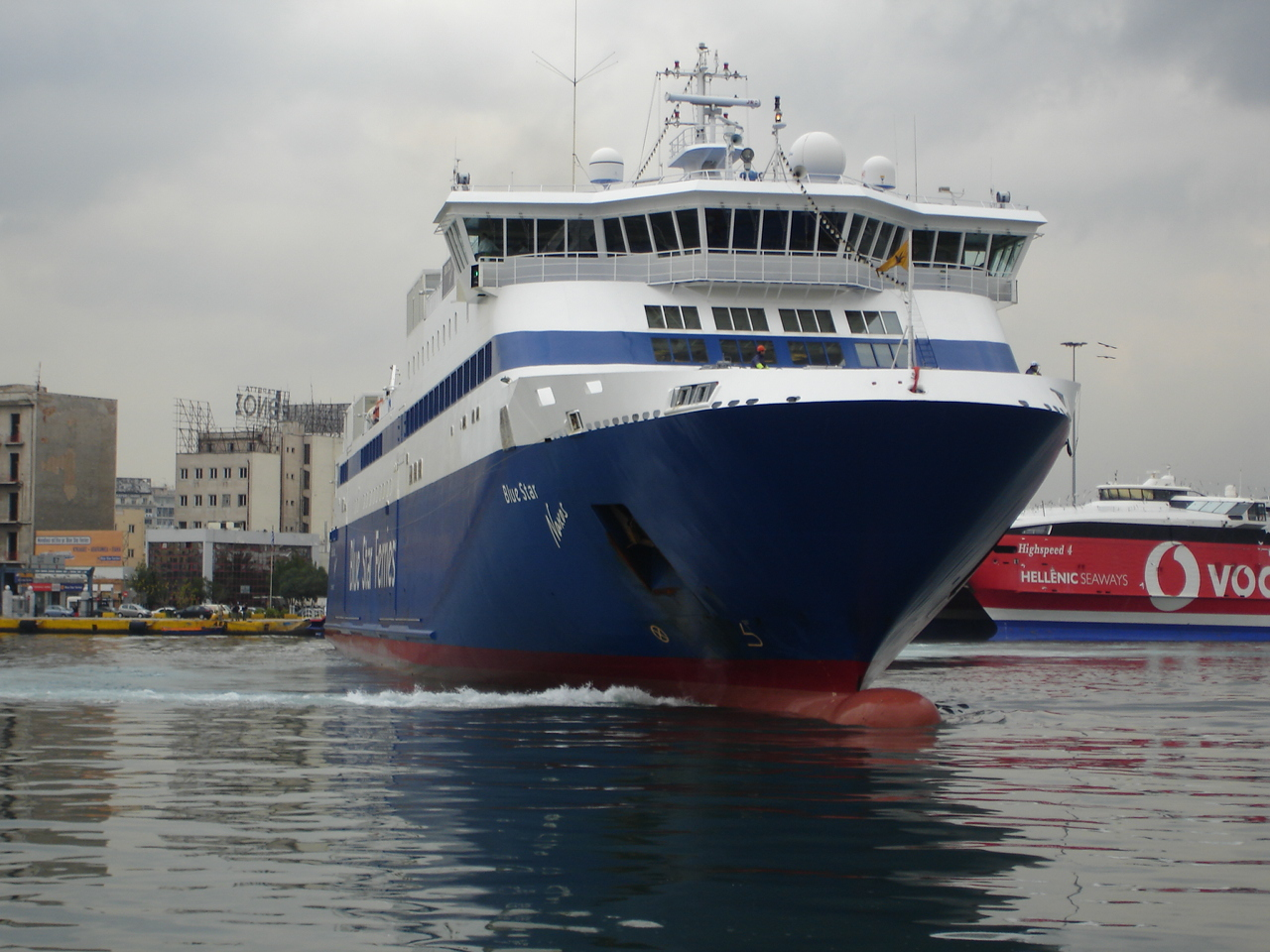
A bow thruster in action. Note the transversal water jet.

Large vessels usually have one or more tunnel thrusters built into the bow, below the waterline. An impeller in the tunnel can create thrust in either direction that makes the ship turn. Most tunnel thrusters are driven by electric motors, but some are hydraulically powered. These bow thrusters, also known as tunnel thrusters, may allow the ship to dock without the assistance of tugboats, saving the costs of such service. Ships equipped with tunnel thrusters typically have a sign marked above the waterline over each thruster on both sides, as a big cross in a circle: Ⓧ.

Tunnel thrusters increase the vessel's resistance to forward motion through the water, but this can be mitigated through proper fairing aft of the tunnel aperture. Ship operators should take care to prevent fouling of the tunnel and impeller, either through use of a protective grate or by cleaning. During vessel design, it is important to determine whether tunnel emergence above the water surface is commonplace in heavy seas. Tunnel emergence hurts thruster performance, and may damage the thruster and the hull around it.

== Externally mounted bow thrusters ==
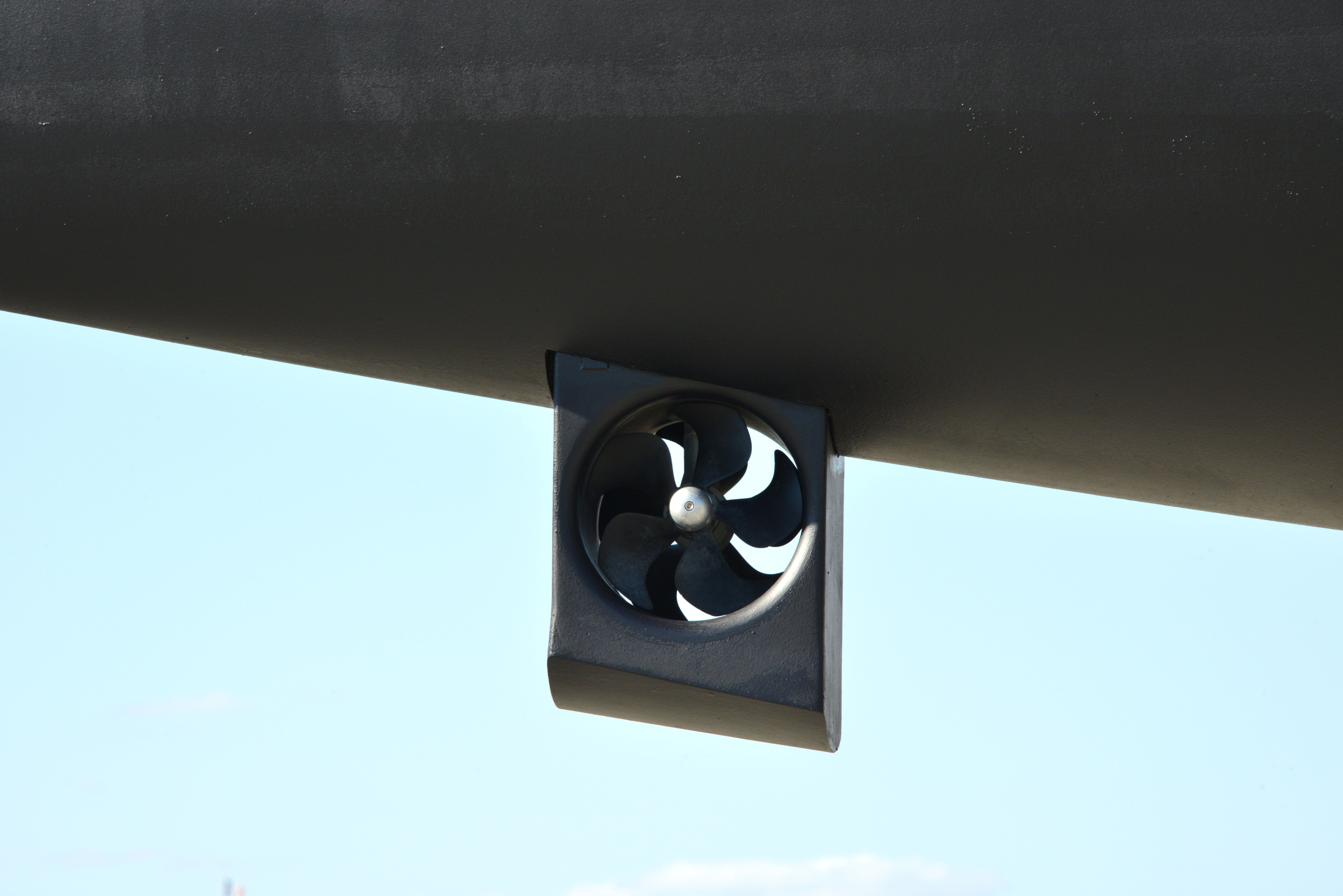
A retractable bow thruster lowered under the front of a sailboat

Instead of a tunnel thruster, boats from 30 to 80 feet (9 to 24 m) in length may have an externally mounted bow thruster. As its name suggests, an external bow thruster is attached to the bow, making it suitable for boats where it is impossible or undesirable to install a tunnel thruster, due to hull shape or outfitting. Externally mounted bow thrusters have one or more propellers driven by a small reversible electric motor which provides thrust in either direction. The added control provided by a bow thruster helps the captain to avoid accidents while docking.

== Waterjet bow thrusters ==
A waterjet thruster is a special type of bow thruster that utilizes a pumping device instead of a conventional propeller. The water is discharged through specially designed nozzles which increase the velocity of the exiting jet. Waterjets generally have the advantage of smaller hull penetrations for an equivalent size thruster. Additionally, the higher exit velocity of the discharged water increases the relative efficiency as speeds of advance, or currents, increase, as compared to standard tunnel thrusters. Some waterjet bow thrusters can be configured to provide forward and aft auxiliary propulsion, or even full 360-degree thrust.

== See also ==
- Azimuth thruster
- Azipod
- Z-drive
- Cyclorotor
- Rim-driven thruster
- Reaction control system – Spacecraft thrusters used to provide attitude control and translation
