= Underwater diving environment =

Underwater environment to which a diver may be exposed

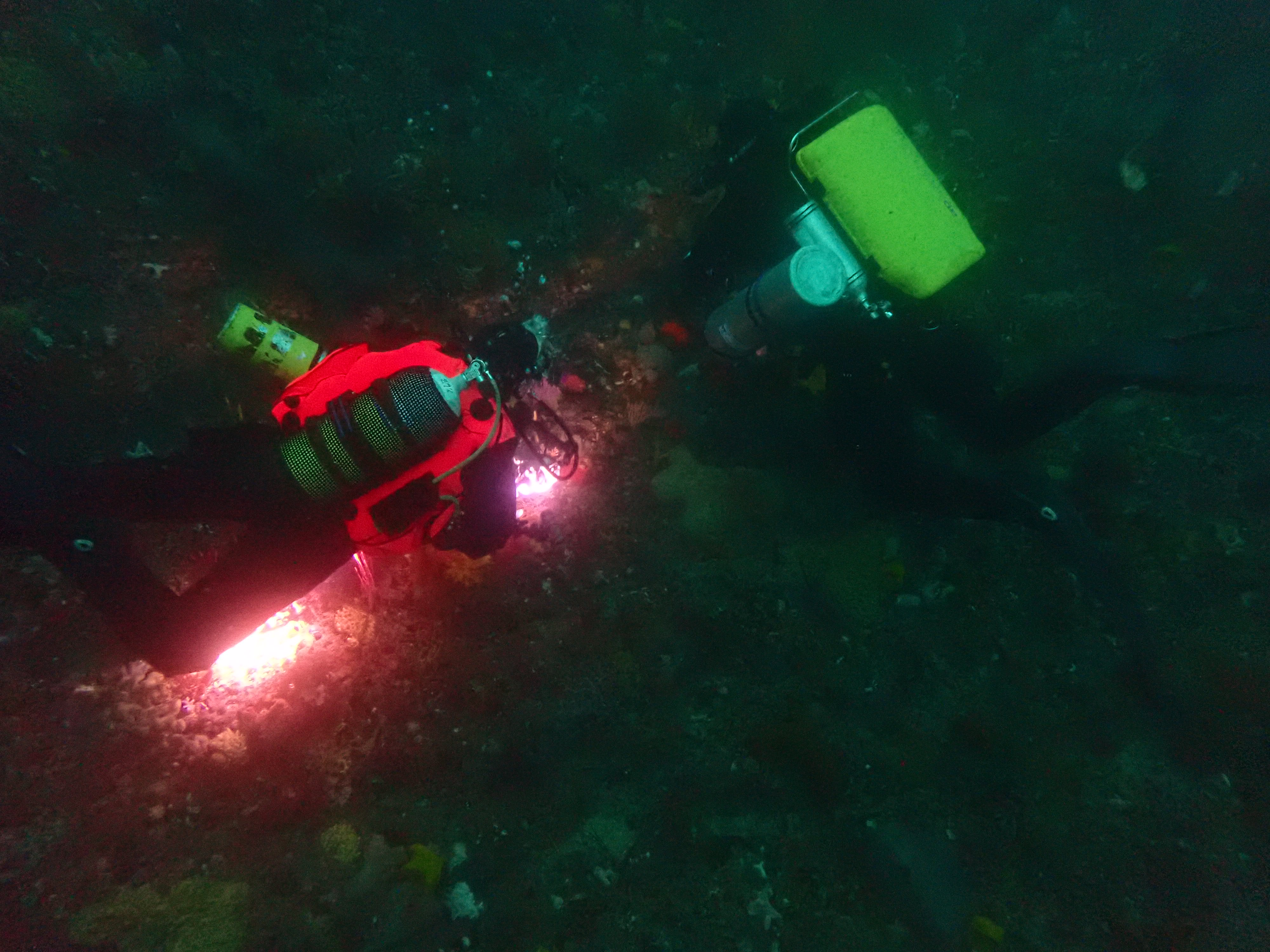
Divers over the reef at Dalgleish bank, a cool temperate offshore rocky reef environment

The underwater diving environment, or just diving environment is the natural or artificial surroundings in which a dive is done. It is usually underwater, but professional diving is sometimes done in other liquids. Underwater diving is the human practice of voluntarily descending below the surface of the water to interact with the surroundings, for various recreational or occupational reasons, but the concept of diving also legally extends to immersion in other liquids, and exposure to other hyperbaric pressurised environments.

The diving environment is limited by accessibility and risk, but includes water and occasionally other liquids. Most underwater diving is done in the shallower coastal parts of the oceans, and inland bodies of fresh water, including lakes, dams, quarries, rivers, springs, flooded caves, reservoirs, tanks, swimming pools, and canals, but may also be done in large bore ducting and sewers, power station cooling systems, cargo and ballast tanks of ships, and liquid-filled industrial equipment. The environment may affect equipment configuration: for instance, freshwater is less dense than saltwater, so less added weight is needed to achieve diver neutral buoyancy in freshwater dives. Water temperature, visibility and movement also affect the diver and the dive plan. Diving in liquids other than water may present special problems due to density, viscosity and chemical compatibility of diving equipment, as well as possible environmental hazards to the diving team.

Benign conditions, sometimes also referred to as confined water, are environments of low risk, where it is extremely unlikely or impossible for the diver to get lost or entrapped, or be exposed to hazards other than the basic underwater environment. These conditions are suitable for initial training in the critical survival skills, and include swimming pools, training tanks, aquarium tanks and some shallow and protected shoreline areas. Open water is unrestricted water such as a sea, lake or flooded quarry, where the diver has unobstructed direct vertical access to the surface of the water in contact with the atmosphere. Open-water diving implies that if a problem arises, the diver can directly ascend vertically to the atmosphere to breathe the ambient air. Wall diving is done along a near vertical face. Blue-water diving is done in good visibility in mid-water where the bottom is out of sight of the diver and there may be no fixed visual reference. Black-water diving is mid-water diving at night, particularly on a moonless night.

An overhead or penetration diving environment is where the diver enters a region from which there is no direct, purely vertical ascent to the safety of breathable atmosphere at the surface. Cave diving, wreck diving, ice diving and diving inside or under other natural or artificial underwater structures or enclosures are examples. The restriction on direct ascent increases the risk of diving under an overhead, and this is usually addressed by adaptations of procedures and use of equipment such as redundant breathing gas sources and guide lines to indicate the route to the exit. Night diving can allow the diver to experience a different underwater environment, because many marine animals are nocturnal. Altitude diving, for example in mountain lakes, requires modifications to the decompression schedule because of the reduced atmospheric pressure.

== Underwater ==
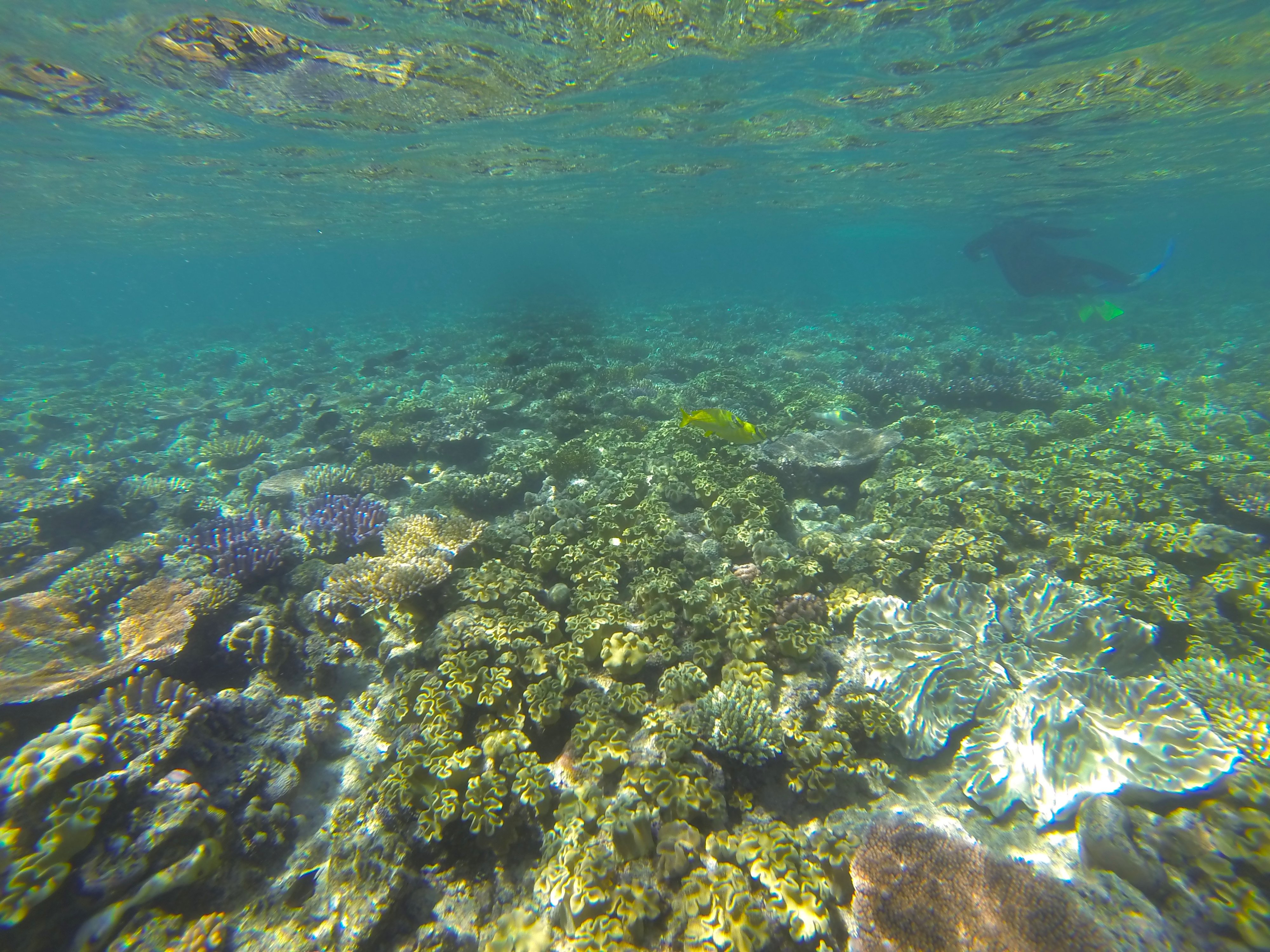
Great Barrier Reef, Australia, a tropical marine coral reef environment

An underwater environment is an environment of, and immersed in, liquid water in a natural or artificial feature (called a body of water), such as an ocean, sea, lake, pond, reservoir, river, canal, or aquifer. Some characteristics of the underwater environment are universal, but many depend on the local situation.

A number of human activities are conducted in the more accessible parts of the underwater environment. These include research, underwater diving for work or recreation, and underwater warfare with submarines. This environment is hostile to humans in many ways and often inaccessible, and therefore relatively little explored.

An immediate obstacle to human activity under water is that human lungs cannot naturally function in this environment. Any penetration into the underwater environment for more than a few minutes requires artificial aids to maintain life. The raised ambient pressure is a problem for any gas-filled spaces like the mouth, ears, paranasal sinuses and lungs. and can cause barotrauma. The raised pressure also affects the solution of breathing gases in the tissues over time, and can lead to a range of adverse effects, such as inert gas narcosis, and oxygen toxicity. Decompression must be controlled to avoid bubble formation in the tissues and the consequent symptoms of decompression sickness. With a few exceptions, the underwater environment tends to cool the unprotected human body. This heat loss will generally lead to hypothermia eventually. Entrainment of a diver by moving water can cause injury by impacting the diver against hard objects or moving them to inappropriate depths.

=== Depth range ===
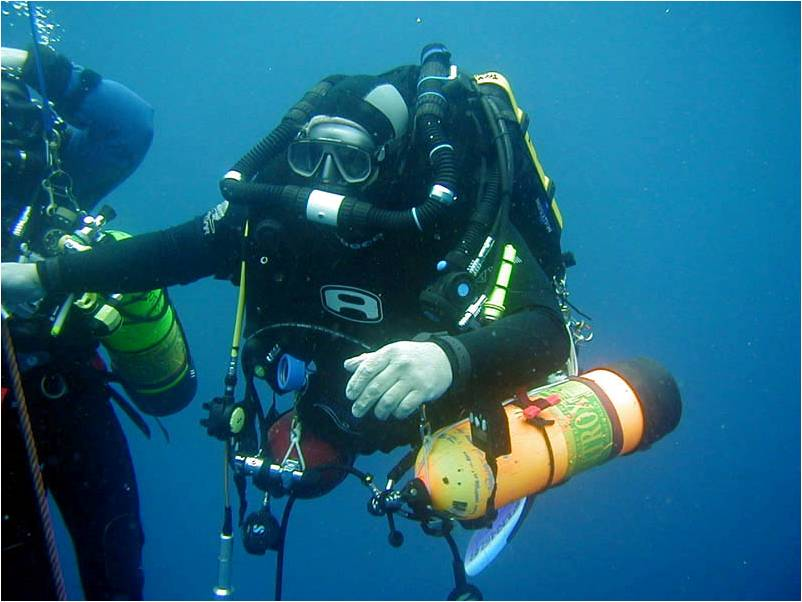
A technical diver using a closed circuit rebreather with open circuit bailout cylinders returns from a 600-foot (180 m) dive.

One of the more obvious environmental constraints on diving is the ambient pressure, which is a function of depth and density.

The recreational diving depth limit set by the EN 14153-2 / ISO 24801-2 level 2 "Autonomous Diver " standard is 20 metres (66 ft). The recommended depth limit for more extensively trained recreational divers ranges from 30 metres (98 ft) for PADI divers, (this is the depth at which nitrogen narcosis symptoms generally begin to be noticeable in adults), to 40 metres (130 ft) specified by Recreational Scuba Training Council, 50 metres (160 ft) for divers of the British Sub-Aqua Club and Sub-Aqua Association breathing air, and 60 metres (200 ft) for teams of 2 to 3 French Level 3 recreational divers, breathing air.

For technical divers, the recommended maximum depths are greater on the understanding that they will use less narcotic gas mixtures. 100 metres (330 ft) is the maximum depth authorised for divers who have completed Trimix Diver certification with IANTD or Advanced Trimix Diver certification with TDI. 332 metres (1,089 ft) is the world record depth on scuba (2014). Commercial divers using saturation techniques and heliox breathing gases routinely exceed 100 metres (330 ft), but they are also limited by physiological constraints. Comex Hydra 8 experimental dives reached a record open water depth of 534 metres (1,752 ft) in 1988. Atmospheric pressure diving suits are mainly constrained by the technology of the articulation seals, and a US Navy diver has dived to 610 metres (2,000 ft) in one. Greater depths can be achieved with submersibles, some of which are capable of "full ocean depth", the greatest underwater depth known on Earth.

== The liquid environment ==
Most diving is done in fresh water, sea water, and brack water, but brines, low density silts, drilling mud, petrochemical liquids, crude and refined oils, alcohol mixtures and other liquids may be dived in for special reasons.

=== Liquids other than water ===
Density and viscosity of the medium are of primary importance, as it must be possible for the diver to sink and move around in the medium. Chemical compatibility with the diving equipment is also essential to some extent, though provided the equipment protects the diver adequately for the duration of the dive, it may be acceptable to dispose of it after the dive. Health risks due to possible contamination of the diver are also a concern, and some of these environments may classify as hazardous materials and require formal decontamination after diving.

== Type and profile of substrate ==
The diving environment can be strongly influenced by the substrate, as most diving activities are conducted near the substrate. Recreational diving sites are commonly chosen by what can be seen there, and that often depends on the geographical location and the bottom structure. Tropical coral reef is the most popular environment among recreational diving tourists, with rocky reefs and shipwrecks also popular, as they tend to both provide scenic topography and support ecological diversity. Rocky substrates can support high-profile structure, like walls, overhangs, talus caves, pinnacles and steep sided gullies. Caves are also sought after for their mystery and sometimes spectacular topography, and may also be dived as a way to explore the underwater extent of flooded areas, or to penetrate beyond sumps. Unconsolidated material such as shingle, pebbles, gravel, sand and silt tend to be relatively flat, and topographically dull, and the ecology in finer grained substrates tends to be largely infauna, but there are also regions known for high biodiversity of colourful and exotic animals and muck diving

When the substrate is out of visual range for the diver, the mid-water with no fixed visual depth reference can be of interest for pelagic fauna. Diving in this environment in good visibility is known as blue-water diving during the day, and black-water diving during the night.

== Water conditions ==
Physical conditions of the water or other diving medium influence the safety and practicability of a dive and can affect the choice of equipment used. These include motion of the medium, visibility and illumination, temperature, and pressure. These conditions are affected by weather, season and climate.

=== Motion and flow of the medium ===
Motion of the water affects the diver's ability to move around and hold a position while performing an activity. Types of water motion include Ocean currents, river currents, tides, waves, surge, upwellings, overfalls, turbulence, springs, and sinks. Motion of water is generally caused by surface wind, gravity and localised pressure differentials.

A high energy underwater environment is one in which the water can move large particles around. Small particles tend to remain in suspension. The turbidity is likely to be high and visibility likely to be relatively poor, but the actions of divers are unlikely to have much influence on these characteristics. A low energy environment encourages deposition of small and relatively light particles, which can produce clear water, with silt deposits on the substrate, easily disturbed by divers to cause a silt-out, and sudden deterioration of visibility.

=== Visibility and illumination ===
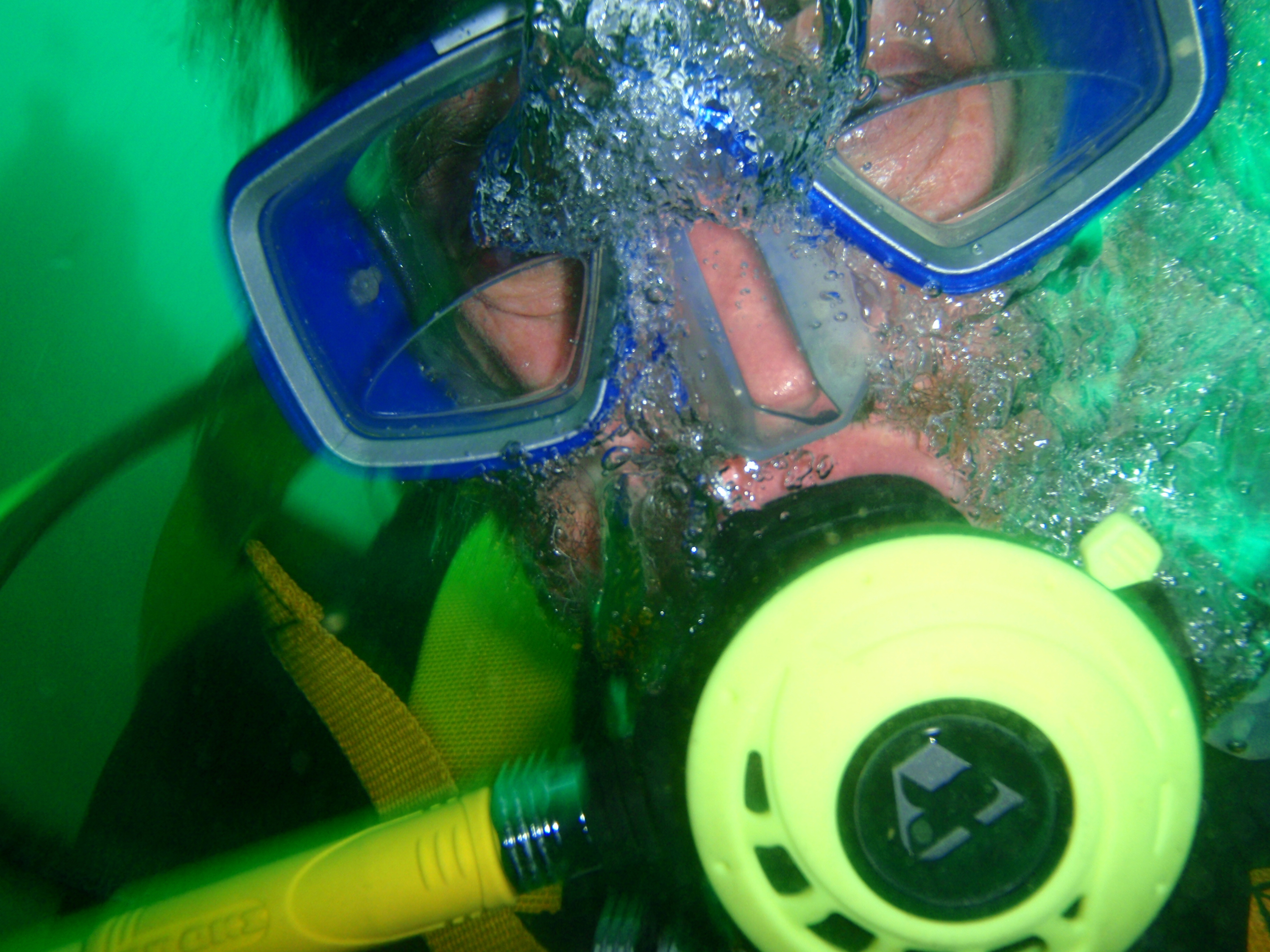
Scuba diver with bifocal lenses fitted to a mask

Visibility, the distance at which objects can be seen in a medium, and illumination, the level of ambient natural of artificial light, are environmental factors which influence the ability of a diver to perform the goal of a dive, and can also strongly affect the safety of the dive. They can be independent of many of the other factors, and dependent on others. Low visibility and zero visibility are usually associated with poor illumination, but visibility can be good even at low light levels, and artificial lighting is available to increase illumination.

=== Water temperatures ===
- Hot water is usually found in industrial environments or natural hot springs. Hot water can cause overheating of divers, and this can be difficult to prevent. Professional divers diving with surface-supplied equipment may use a flow of cooling water analogous to a hot water suit.
- Tropical water is the natural temperature of bodies of water in tropical regions, due to heating by the sun and cooling by wind. Maximum sea surface temperature can reach about 35 °C (95 °F).
- Temperate water is water cooler than tropical, and warmer than "cold water". For diving purposes this can be considered the temperature range in which a full wetsuit is acceptable thermal protection for most divers for most diving activities. The range of 10 to 25 °C (50 to 77 °F) could generally be considered temperate water for diving.
- Cool water is water at temperatures which are tolerable for a short to moderate time unprotected, and in which heat loss can be managed without difficulty by passive insulation alone. A long-distance swimmer might find the temperature acceptable for a long but active immersion.
- Cold water is generally considered as temperatures below 10 °C (50 °F) where regulator freeze becomes a significant possibility.
- Under ice, the temperature of fresh water is limited to 0 °C (32 °F) at the surface or directly under the ice, and up to 4 °C (39 °F)in deeper water. In sea water the temperatures can be a few degrees lower, the minimum recorded temperature for Antarctic bottom water is −2.6 °C (27.3 °F).

Colder than normal water can be encountered as a consequence of upwellings

==== Air temperatures ====
Ambient air temperatures at a dive site can differ considerably from the water conditions. It is common to find that the air temperature is more extreme than the water temperature, as in polar diving, where the water temperature can be several degrees warmer than the air, or tropical and temperate waters where the air can be several degrees hotter than the water. Wind chill can also affect the comfort and safety of the diving team, as it accelerates heat loss.

== High altitude ==
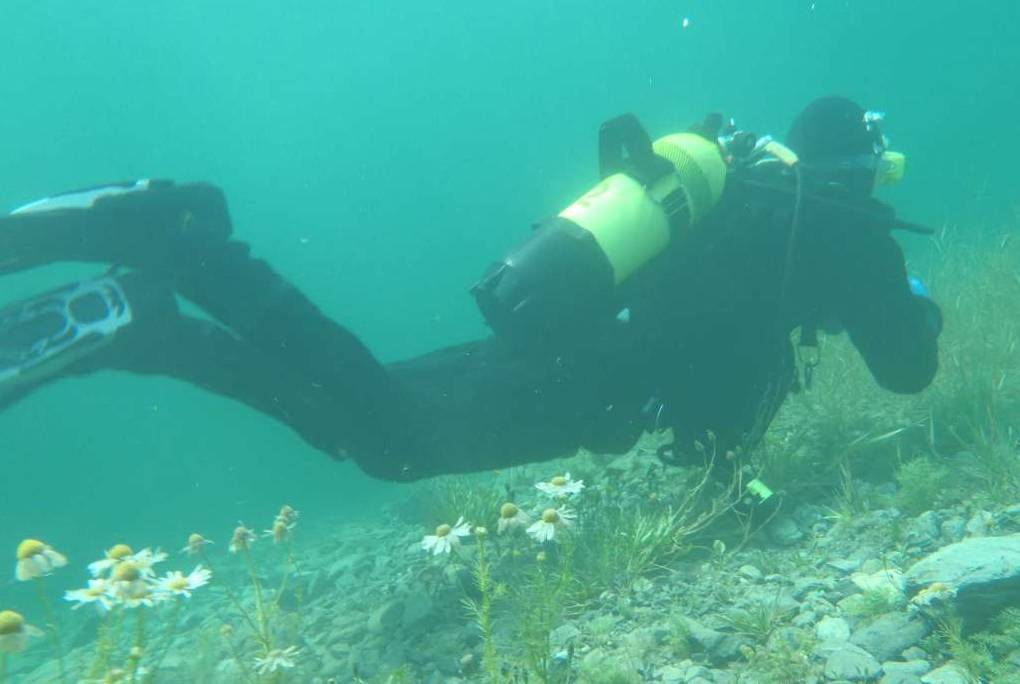
SCUBA Diver in the mountain lake Lai da Marmorera 1,680 metres (5,510 ft) above sea level)

Altitude is significant in diving because it affects the decompression requirement for a dive, so that the stop depths and decompression times used for dives at altitude are different from those used for the same dive profile at sea level. The U.S. Navy tables recommend that no alteration be made for dives at altitudes lower than 91 metres (299 ft), and for dives between 91 and 300 meters altitude, correction is required for dives deeper than 44 metres (144 ft) of sea water equivalent. Altitude diving is generally considered to be underwater diving using scuba or Surface-supplied diving equipment where the surface is 300 metres (980 ft) or more above sea level (for example, a mountain lake). Many recently manufactured decompression computers can automatically detect and compensate for altitude, in some others it is a user setting.

== Hazardous materials ==
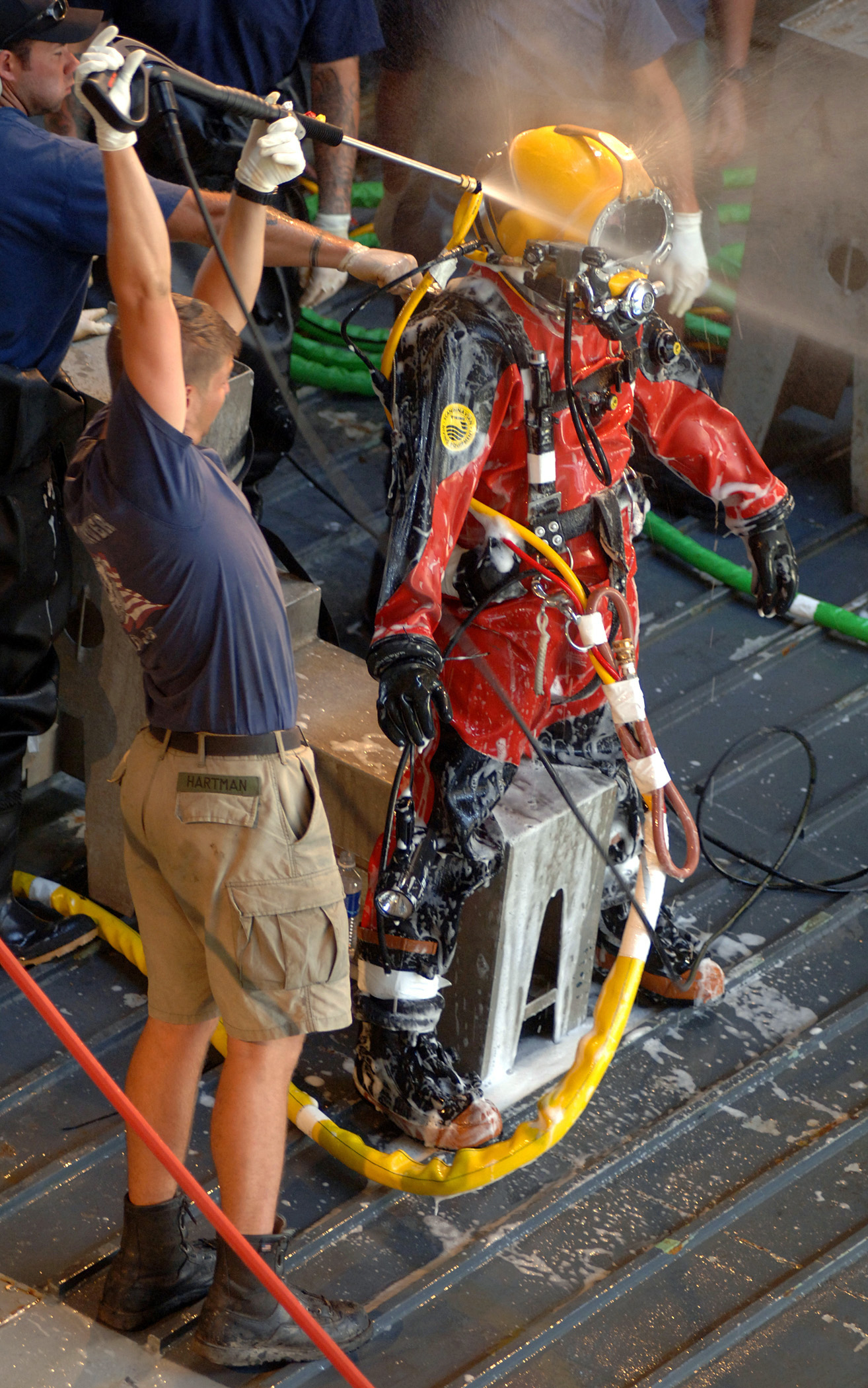
US Navy Diver being decontaminated after a dive. If the contamination was severe, the decontamination team would have been wearing hazmat gear.

The diving environment may be contaminated by hazardous materials, the diving medium may be inherently a hazardous material, or the environment in which the diving medium is situated may include hazardous materials with a significant risk of exposure to these materials to members of the diving team. Hazmat diving is underwater diving in a known hazardous materials environment. Special precautions, equipment and procedures are associated with hazmat diving so that the risk can be reduced to an acceptable level.

== Aquatic and marine organisms ==
Aquatic and marine organisms are part of the underwater environment, They may be considered hazards, or the reason to dive, or both. Sometimes the same species or individual can be both a hazard and the subject of study or entertainment. Marine and aquatic biologists, conservationists, amateur naturalists, underwater photographers and videographers, and recreational divers may dive to observe, monitor, record, collect, or hunt the underwater life.

== Confined spaces and overheads ==
An overhead diving environment or penetration diving environment implies that there is a physical obstacle to a direct ascent to a water surface in contact with breathable air. Most confined space diving environments are under an overhead. Overhead environments include work under ships and other structures, culverts, inside industrial installations, drains, sewers, penstocks and similar installations, as well as the better known cave, cavern, and wreck diving environments. The restriction on direct ascent increases the risk of diving under an overhead, and this is usually addressed by adaptations of procedures and use of equipment such as redundant breathing gas sources and guide lines to indicate the route to the exit.

=== Caves and caverns ===
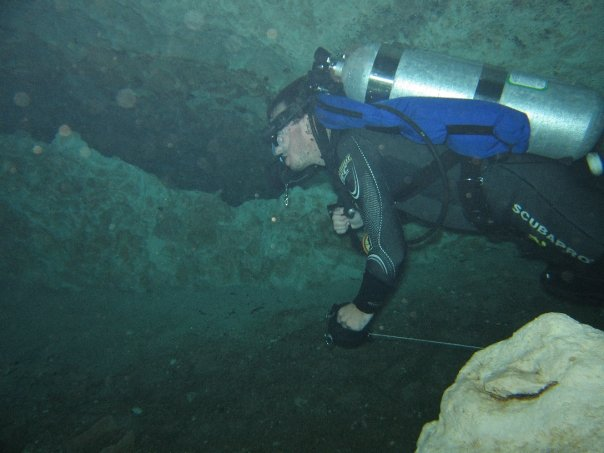
A cave diver running a reel with guide line into the overhead environment

The flooded and partially flooded underground environment is dived for recreation, exploration, and scientific investigation, and occasionally for the search for and recovery of divers or, as in the 2018 Thai cave rescue, other cave users. A cave is a form of overhead environment and may include restrictions and low visibility due to silt suspended in the water. Various types of caves and mines may be flooded and provide cave diving environments. The interior of caves is mostly beyond the reach of natural light, and may have a flow of water through the flooded passages. The flow is normally one directional, and may be inwards as a sink or swallet, outwards as a spring or resurgence, or in from one side and out through the other, with access to the water partway along the flow. The entire interior may be flooded, or parts may be dry, sometimes with sumps separating them. Flow velocity will vary as the cross-sectional area changes, and areas of high flow velocity can occur, making restrictions more hazardous. Sea caves may have bidirectional flow caused by tides, and anchialine caves, which are usually coastal, contain a mixture of freshwater and saline water (usually sea water) of different densities, sometimes separated by a distinct halocline.

An arbitrary distinction is made by recreational diver training agencies between caves and caverns, where cavern diving is deemed to be diving in those parts of a cave where the exit to open water can be seen by natural light. An arbitrary distance limit to the open water surface may also be specified.

=== Sunken shipwrecks and other submerged structures ===
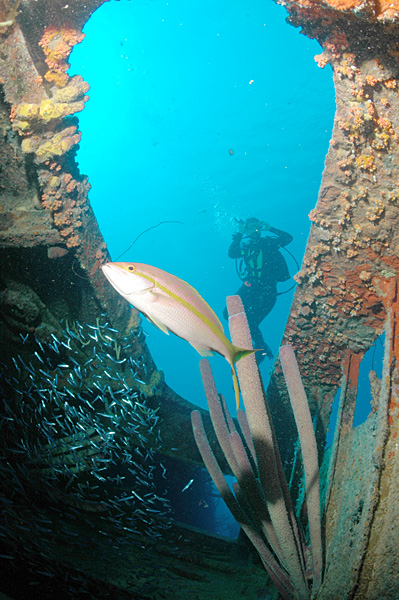
Diver at the wreck of the Hilma Hooker, Netherlands Antilles.

Recreational diving where the wreckage of ships, aircraft and other artificial structures are explored is called wreck diving. The term is used mainly by recreational and technical divers. Professional divers, when diving on a shipwreck, generally refer to the specific task, such as salvage work, accident investigation or archaeological survey. Most wreck dive sites are at shipwrecks, but redundant ships are sometimes scuttled to create artificial reef sites. Diving to crashed aircraft can also be considered wreck diving. The recreation of wreck diving makes no distinction as to how the vessel ended up on the bottom. Some wreck diving involves penetration of the wreckage, making a direct ascent to the surface impossible for a part of the dive.

The diving work associated with the recovery of all or part of ships, their cargoes, aircraft, and other vehicles and structures which have sunk or fallen into water is called salvage diving. In the case of ships it may also refer to diving to do repair work to make an abandoned or distressed but still floating vessel more suitable for towing or propulsion under its own power.

Most salvage diving is commercial work, or military work, depending on the diving contractor and the purpose for the salvage operation, Similar underwater work may be done by divers as part of forensic investigations into accidents, in which case the procedures may be more closely allied with underwater archaeology than the more basic procedures of advantageous cost/benefit expected in commercial and military operations.

Clearance diving, the removal of obstructions and hazards to navigation, is closely related to salvage diving, but has a different purpose, in that the objects to be removed are not intended to be recovered, just removed or reduced to a condition where they no longer constitute a hazard or obstruction.

=== Floating vessels and structures ===
The underside of the hull is an overhead environment with no direct vertical access to the surface. As such it constitutes an entrapment hazard, particularly under large vessels where it may be too dark due to low natural light or turbid water to see the way to the side of the hull. The bottom of the largest ships is mostly flat and featureless, exacerbating the problem. There is also a hazard of crushing if the clearance is small and the tide range is large or the vessel is aground. A similar environment can be found under floating jetties. A steel hull will affect the local magnetic field, making compass navigation unreliable in its vicinity.

=== Interior of engineering or built structures ===
Sewers, tanks, pipelines, culverts, tunnels, intakes, drains, etc. may require inspection or maintenance while full or partly full of water. Where a flow that can endanger the diver is possible, the valves controlling such flow must be closed during diving operations, or other measures taken to ensure the safety of divers in the water. In some of these environments the diver must be protected from contamination by the water, and in others, such as potable water systems, the water may have to be protected from contamination by the diver and their equipment.

=== Under ice ===
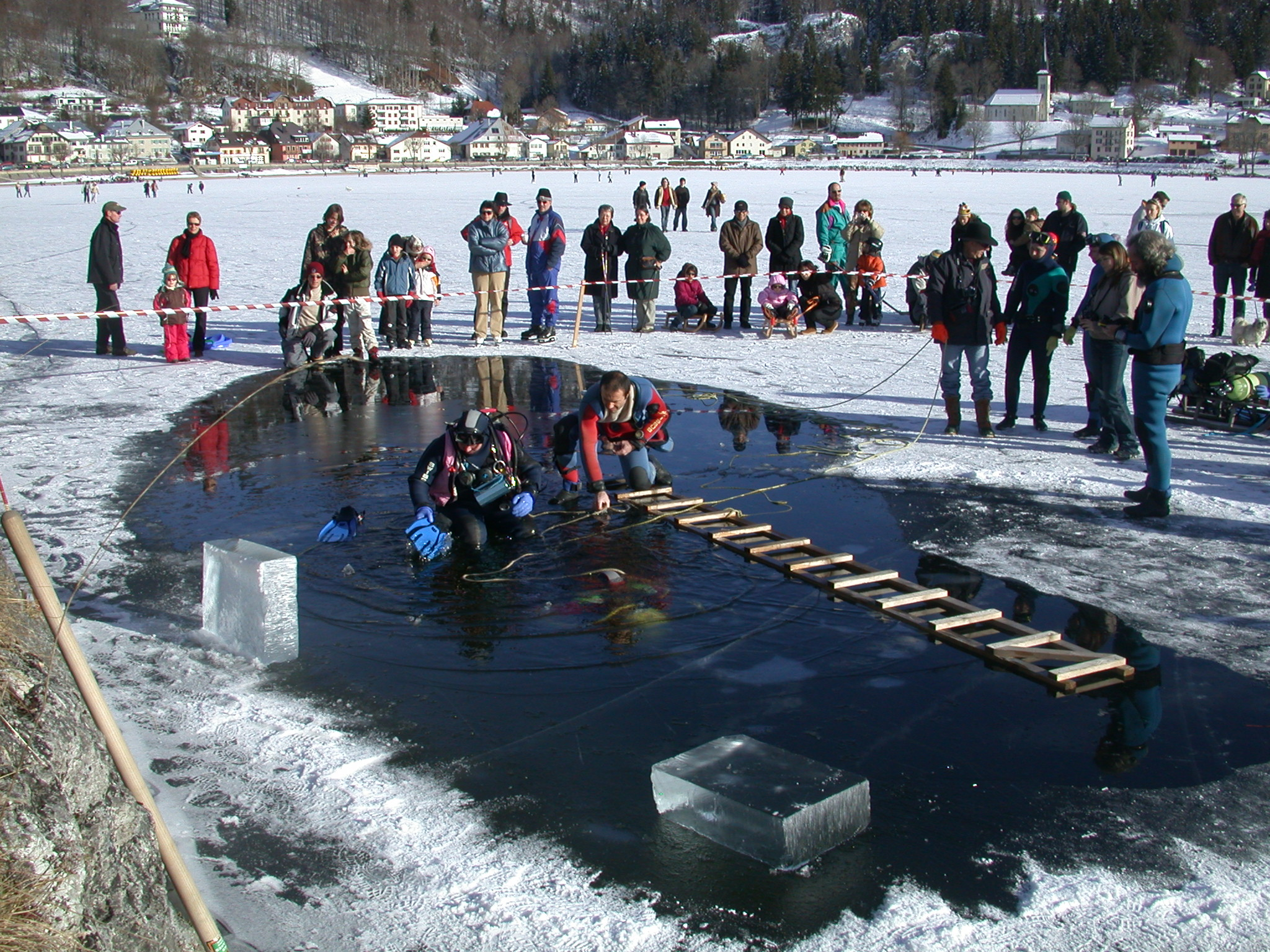
Ice diving

Ice diving is a type of penetration diving where the dive takes place under ice. Because diving under ice places the diver in an overhead environment typically with only a single entry/exit point, it requires special procedures and equipment. Ice diving is done for purposes of recreation, scientific research, public safety (usually search and rescue/recovery) and other professional or commercial reasons.

The most obvious hazards of ice diving are getting lost under the ice, hypothermia, and regulator failure due to freezing. Scuba divers are generally tethered for safety. This means that the diver wears a harness to which a line is secured, and the other end of the line is secured above the surface and monitored by an attendant. Surface supplied equipment inherently provides a tether, and reduces the risks of regulator first stage freezing as the first stage can be managed by the surface team, and the breathing gas supply is less limited. For the surface support team, the hazards include freezing temperatures and falling through thin ice.

Dangerous animals like polar bears and leopard seals may also be present at polar dive sites, presenting an additional risk both in and out of the water.

== Arbitrary geographical and legal distinctions ==
=== Offshore ===
Offshore diving is basically a legal distinction, and usually refers to commercial diving operations outside of the territorial waters of a country where national legislation does not apply, but usually within an exclusive economic zone (EEZ). It incidentally implies that the dive site is more than 12 nautical miles (territorial waters), and less than 200 nautical miles (EEZ) from the nearest inhabited land mass. Technically it also refers to any diving done in the international offshore waters (high seas) outside of the territorial waters of a state. The term also commonly refers to a branch of commercial diving, with divers working in support of the exploration and production sector of the oil and gas industry. Much of the work in this area of the industry includes maintenance of oil platforms and the building and maintenance of underwater structures and systems. Offshore diving beyond the EEZ does also occur, and is often for scientific purposes.

=== Inshore ===
The inshore diving environment is the territorial waters of a nation. It implies that the occupational safety legislation of the adjoining territory applies, and is normally within 12 nautical miles of the coastal baseline.

=== Inland ===
The inland diving environment is inland of the tidal high-water mark, and is usually fresh or brack water, but can gave a very high range of possible salinity. Inland diving is normally covered by national or state occupational safety legislation.

=== Open ocean ===
Those parts of the ocean where the water conditions are not directly affected by proximity to land or the seabed. Sometimes described as "far from land", which is subjective, or "out of sight of land", but that is a vague criterion affected by coastal landforms, observer position and meteorological conditions. Also sometimes used as a synonym for the pelagic zone.

=== Underwater worksites ===
For professional divers the diving environment is the underwater worksite and the water between it and the point at which they enter the water. This will vary depending on the specific job in hand. Legally, time spent in a hyperbaric environment is part of the dive, so closed bells, decompression chambers and saturation accommodations can be considered to be part of the diving environment where applicable.

==== Scenes of crimes, accidents and disasters ====
The crime scene environment in which police divers may be deployed to gather evidence or recover bodies is defined by reasonable belief that a crime ha been committed or that evidence of a crime is likely to be present.

Due to the conditions in which accidents may happen, or where criminals may choose to dispose of evidence or their victims, police divers and public safety divers might need to dive under hostile environmental conditions with known and unknown hazards on short notice:

Forensic divers may be called in to investigate and recover evidence in aircraft crashes, submerged road and rail vehicles, watercraft accidents, homicides, suicides, swimming fatalities and any other incidents and crimes associated with a body of water. Forensic divers may face a number of environmental hazards from underwater structures and infrastructure, debris, industrial pollution, medical waste, organic hazards from various sources, shifting currents, poor visibility, hypothermia and hyperthermia, for which special equipment may be required to mitigate the risk.

=== Recreational dive sites ===
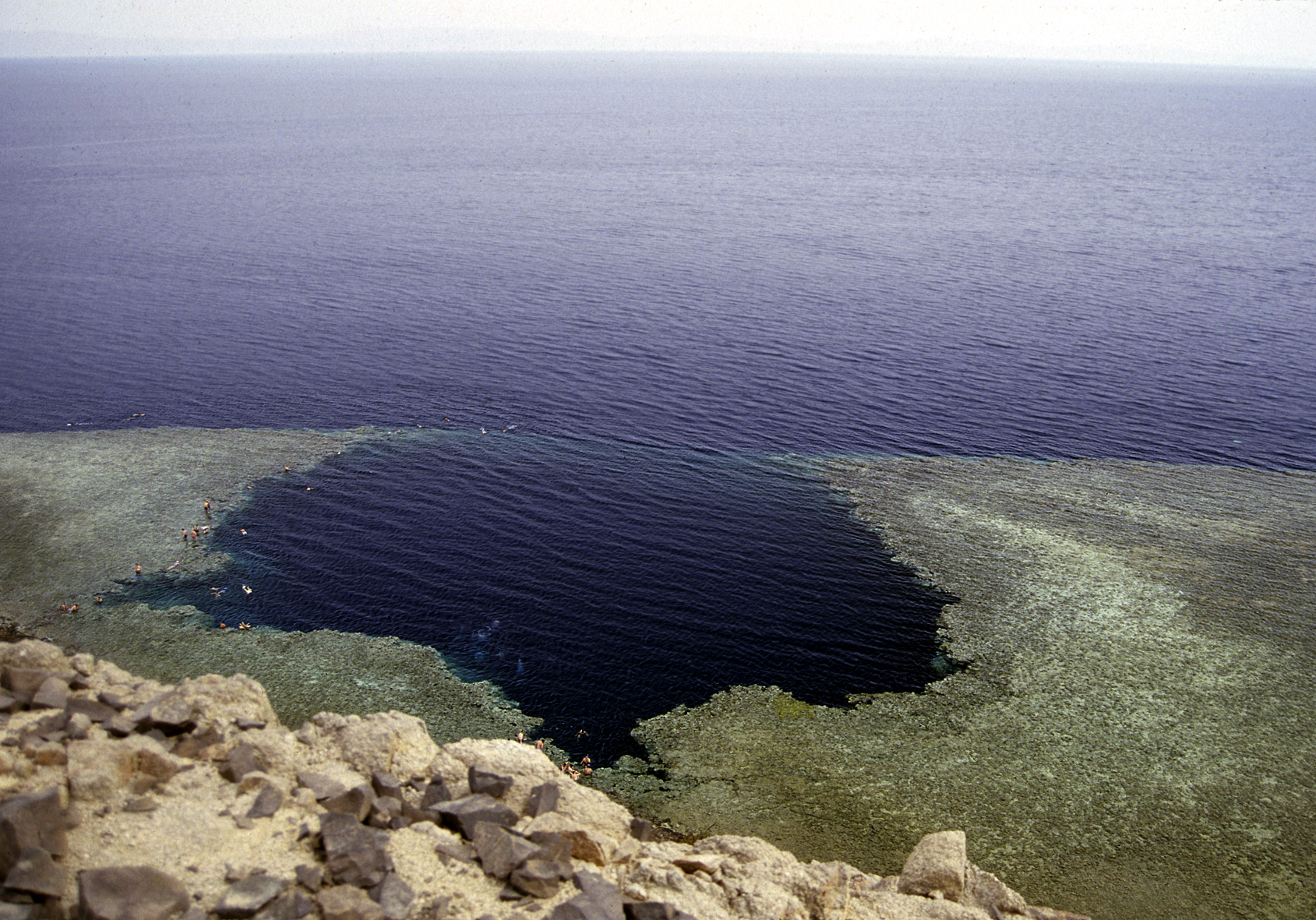
The Blue Hole in Dahab, Egypt, a world-renowned recreational dive site

The common term for a place at which one may dive is a dive site (from "dive" and "site", meaning "the place, scene, or point of an occurrence or event".) As a general rule, professional diving is done where the work needs to be done, and recreational diving is done where conditions are suitable. There are many recorded and publicised recreational dive sites which are known for their convenience, points of interest, biodiversity, and frequently favourable conditions.

=== Diver training sites ===
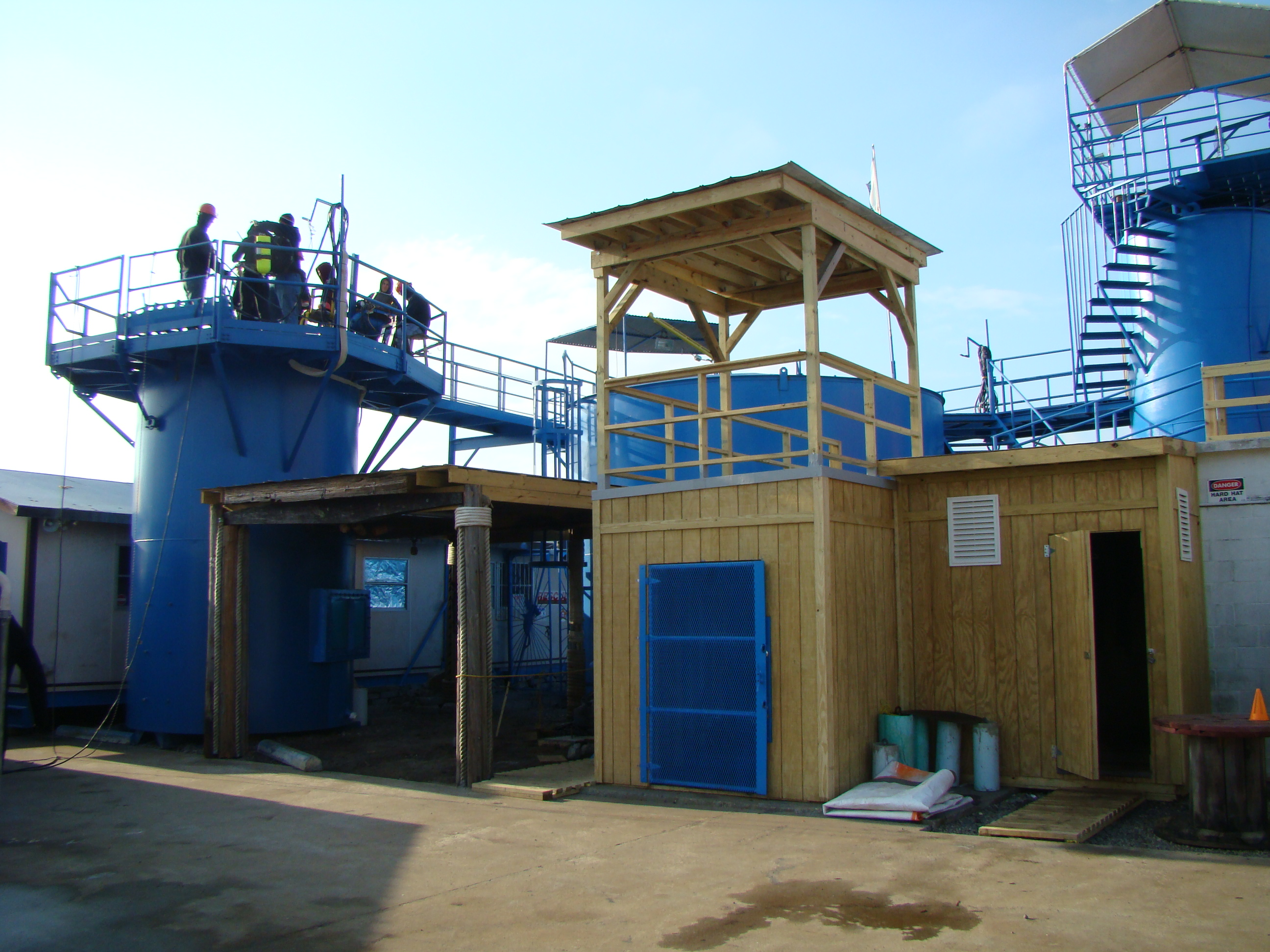
Diver training tanks at a commercial diving school

Diver training facilities for both professional and recreational divers generally use a small range of training dive sites which are familiar and convenient, and where conditions are predictable and the environmental risk is relatively low. They include confined water and open water sites, chosen to suit the specific training requirements.

Initial skills training is restricted to confined water, a diving environment that is enclosed and bounded sufficiently for safe training purposes. This generally implies that conditions are not affected by geographic or weather conditions, and that divers can not get lost. Swimming pools and diver training tanks are included in this category. Once competence has been demonstrated in confined water, repetition of skills in open water is usual. This is generally done in environmental conditions that simulate realistic but relatively low risk circumstances when reasonably practicable.

== See also ==
- Caisson (engineering) – Rigid structure to provide workers with a dry working environment below water level
- List of diving environments by type – Variety of environments that people may dive in
- List of diving hazards and precautions – Hazards associated with underwater diving
- Underwater habitat – Human habitable underwater enclosure filled with breathable gas
- Work in compressed air – Occupational activity in an atmosphere with a raised ambient pressure
