= Penetration diving =

Diving under a physical barrier to a direct vertical ascent to the surface

An overhead or penetration diving environment is where the diver enters a space from which there is no direct, purely vertical ascent to the safety of breathable atmosphere at the surface. Cave diving, wreck diving, ice diving and diving inside or under other natural or artificial underwater structures or enclosures are examples. The restriction on direct ascent increases the risk of diving under an overhead, and this is usually addressed by adaptations of procedures and use of equipment such as redundant breathing gas sources and guide lines to indicate the route to the exit.

There are some applications where scuba diving is appropriate and surface-supplied diving is not, and other where the reverse is true. In other applications either may be appropriate, and the mode is chosen to suit the specific circumstances.

== Environments ==
Penetration diving is also known as diving in overhead environments, which is a class of confinement which restricts the diver from free vertical access to the surface. An overhead environment may also be a confined space, in which the diver is restricted in their ability to maneuver, and is in this respect the opposite of open water. Confinement can influence diver safety and the ability of the diver to perform the required task. Some types of confinement improve safety by limiting the ability of the diver to move into higher risk areas, others limit the ability of the diver to maneuver, to perform the task of the dive, or to escape to a place of safety in an emergency. The usual types of recreational penetration diving are cave diving, cavern diving, ice diving and wreck penetration diving. Professional divers may also penetrate culverts, intakes such as penstocks, sewers, and under floating ships.

An overhead may be as minor as an overhang, a topographical feature which is open to at least one side, but obstructed overhead, and deep enough for a diver to be under the overhang, or as severe as a major restriction deep inside a cave or wreck. A restriction is a space through which it is possible for a diver to pass with some difficulty due to a lack of space. A minor restriction is too small for two divers to swim through together, a major restriction requires the diver to remove some equipment to fit through.

A swim-through is an arch, lintel, or short, clear tunnel that has sufficient space to allow a diver to swim through and where the light of the opening at the far end is visible through the hole. It is technically an overhead environment, but one often entered by divers with only open water certification, if the risk of entrapment appears to be very low. Diving under moored ships, usually for inspection, maintenance and repair, or incidentally, when diving from one is also considered penetration diving if the ship is large. In some cases the gap between the ship and the bottom or the jetty or dock can be quite small and the visibility may be poor.

Fatal accidents have occurred when a diver has run out of air trying to find the way out from under a large flat-bottomed vessel in low visibility.

== Cave diving ==
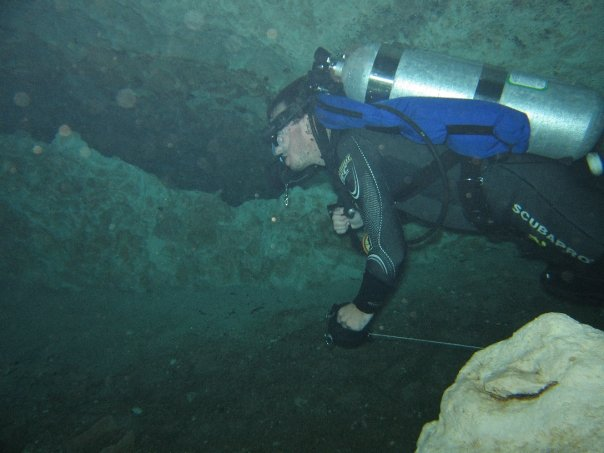
A cave diver running a reel with guide line into the overhead environment

Cave-diving is underwater diving in water-filled caves. It may be done as an extreme sport, a way of exploring flooded caves for scientific investigation, or for the search for and recovery of divers or, as in the 2018 Thai cave rescue, other cave users. The equipment used varies depending on the circumstances, and ranges from breath hold to surface supplied, but almost all cave-diving is done using scuba equipment, often in specialised configurations with redundancies such as sidemount or backmounted twinset. Recreational cave-diving is generally considered to be a type of technical diving due to the lack of a free surface during large parts of the dive, and often involves planned decompression stops. A distinction is made by recreational diver training agencies between cave-diving and cavern-diving, where cavern diving is deemed to be diving in those parts of a cave where the exit to open water can be seen by natural light. An arbitrary distance limit to the open water surface may also be specified.

Equipment, procedures, and the requisite skills have been developed to reduce the risk of becoming lost in a flooded cave, and consequently drowning when the breathing gas supply runs out. The equipment aspect largely involves the provision of an adequate breathing gas supply to cover reasonably foreseeable contingencies, redundant dive lights and other safety critical equipment, and the use of a continuous guideline leading the divers back out of the overhead environment. The skills and procedures include effective management of the equipment, and procedures to recover from foreseeable contingencies and emergencies, both by individual divers, and by the teams that dive together.

Despite these risks, water-filled caves attract scuba divers, cavers, and speleologists due to their often unexplored nature, and present divers with a technical diving challenge. Underwater caves have a wide range of physical features, and can contain fauna not found elsewhere. Several organisations dedicated to cave diving safety and exploration exist, and several agencies provide specialised training in the skills and procedures considered necessary for acceptable safety.

=== Cavern diving ===
Cavern diving is an arbitrarily defined, limited scope activity of diving in the naturally illuminated part of underwater caves, where the risk of getting lost is small, as the exit can be seen, and the equipment needed is reduced due to the limited distance to surface air. It is defined as a recreational diving activity as opposed to a technical diving activity on the grounds of low risk and basic equipment requirements.

== Ice diving ==
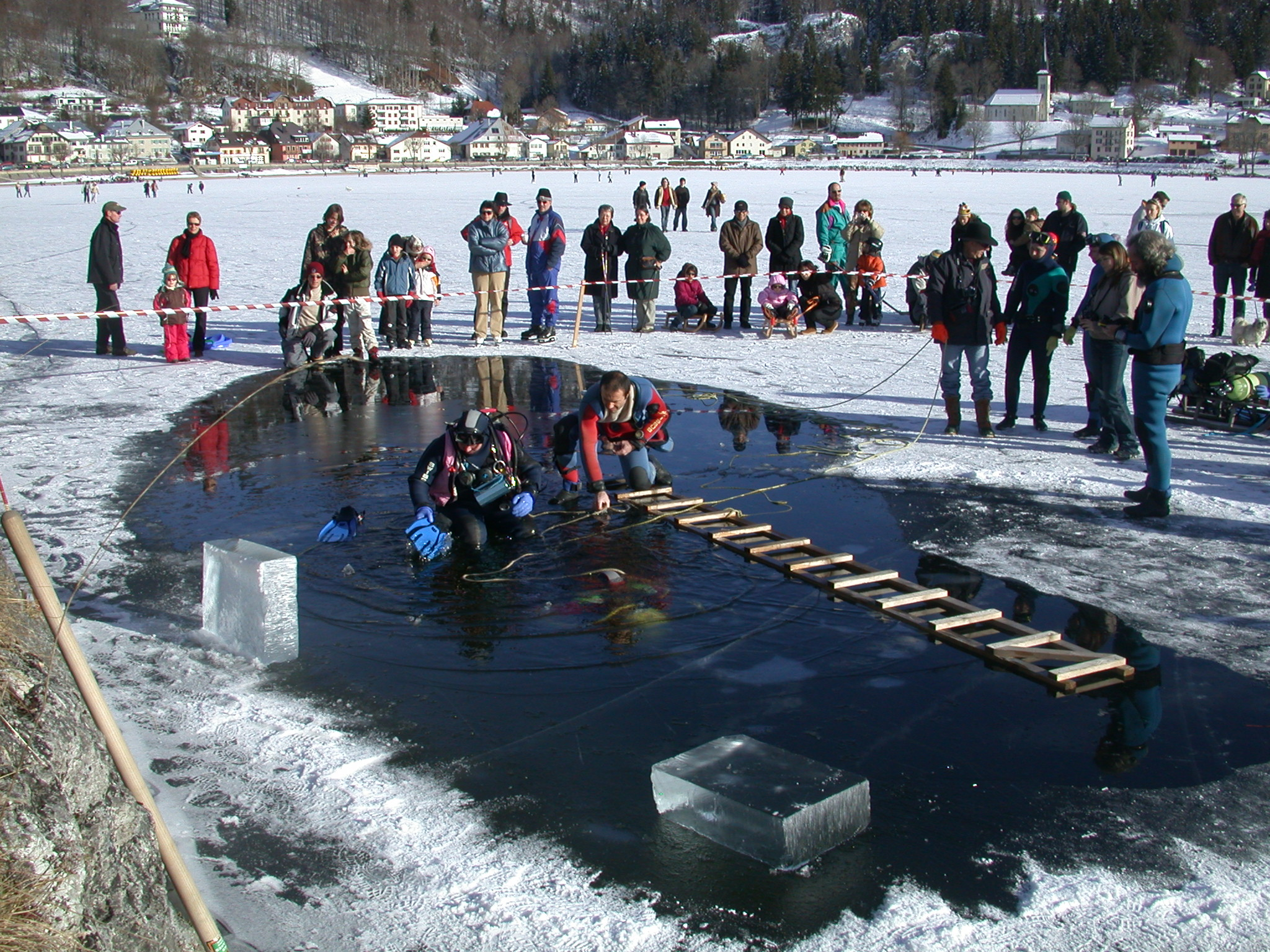

Ice diving is a type of penetration diving where the dive takes place under ice. Because diving under ice places the diver in an overhead environment typically with only a single entry/exit point, it requires special procedures and equipment. Ice diving is done for purposes of recreation, scientific research, public safety (usually search and rescue/recovery) and other professional or commercial reasons.

The most obvious hazards of ice diving are getting lost under the ice, hypothermia, and regulator failure due to freezing. Scuba divers are generally tethered for safety. This means that the diver wears a harness to which a line is secured, and the other end of the line is secured above the surface and monitored by an attendant. Surface supplied equipment inherently provides a tether, and reduces the risks of regulator first stage freezing as the first stage can be managed by the surface team, and the breathing gas supply is less limited. For the surface support team, the hazards include freezing temperatures and falling through thin ice.

== Wreck penetration diving ==
Penetration diving in shipwrecks is done as a recreational activity and as a professional activity in salvage and clearance work.

=== Wreck diving ===
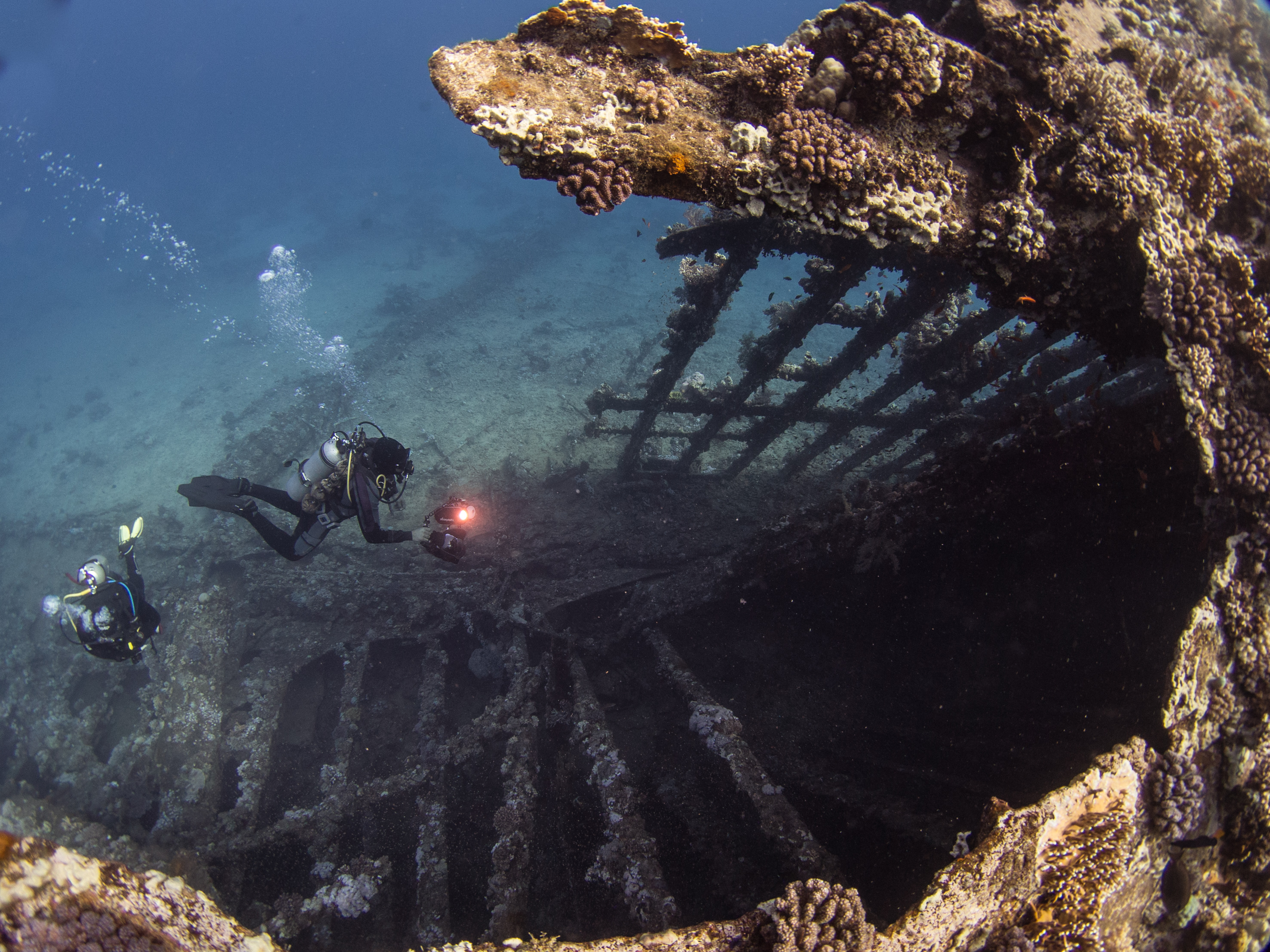
Divers at the wreck of the SS Carnatic

Wreck diving is recreational diving where the wreckage of ships, aircraft and other artificial structures are explored. The term is used mainly by recreational and technical divers. Professional divers, when diving on a shipwreck, generally refer to the specific task, such as salvage work, accident investigation or archaeological survey. Although most wreck dive sites are at shipwrecks, there is an increasing trend to scuttle retired ships to create artificial reef sites. Diving to crashed aircraft can also be considered wreck diving. The recreation of wreck diving makes no distinction as to how the vessel ended up on the bottom.

Some wreck diving involves penetration of the wreckage, making a direct ascent to the surface impossible for a part of the dive.

=== Salvage diving ===
Salvage diving is the diving work associated with the recovery of all or part of ships, their cargoes, aircraft, and other vehicles and structures which have sunk or fallen into water. In the case of ships it may also refer to repair work done to make an abandoned or distressed but still floating vessel more suitable for towing or propulsion under its own power. The recreational/technical activity known as wreck diving is generally not considered salvage work, though some recovery of artifacts may be done by recreational divers.

Most salvage diving is commercial work, or military work, depending on the diving contractor and the purpose for the salvage operation, Similar underwater work may be done by divers as part of forensic investigations into accidents, in which case the procedures may be more closely allied with underwater archaeology than the more basic procedures of advantageous cost/benefit expected in commercial and military operations.

Salvage work that may require penetration of flooded internal spaces or diving under the vessel includes surveys of underwater damage, patching, shoring and other reinforcement, and attachment of lifting gear.

=== Clearance diving ===
Clearance diving, the removal of obstructions and hazards to navigation, is closely related to salvage diving, but has a different purpose, in that the objects to be removed are not intended to be recovered, just removed or reduced to a condition where they no longer constitute a hazard or obstruction. Many of the techniques and procedures used in clearance diving are also used in salvage work.

== Diving under ships ==
The underside of the hull is an overhead environment with no direct vertical access to the surface. As such it constitutes an entrapment hazard, particularly under large vessels where it may be too dark due to low natural light or turbid water to see the way to the side of the hull. The bottom of the largest ships is mostly flat and featureless, exacerbating the problem, and as the plating is almost always steel, a magnetic compass is not reliable for navigation. Only surface-supplied diving is authorised for this work in most jurisdictions, as this not only secures the diver's breathing gas supply, but also provides a guideline to the exit point. There is also a hazard of crushing if the clearance is small and the tide range is large.

== Safety and risk management ==
The main generic hazards of penetration diving are being unable to navigate back to the surface and running out of breathing gas before reaching the surface. Both of these hazards are well mitigated by the use of surface supplied breathing equipment, but at the cost of seriously reduced mobility and extremely restricted range, to the extent that some penetration activities are impossible on surface supply.

=== Scuba diving ===
For scuba diving, the risk of getting lost and running out of breathing gas is real and significant. These are the most common factors recorded in diving deaths in penetration diving. The use of a continuous guideline leading to open water is recognised as the most important safety precaution in any overhead environment with a real possibility of not being able to see the way out, along with sufficient emergency gas to compensate for any single catastrophic breathing gas supply failure at any time during the planned course of a penetration dive.

=== Surface supplied diving ===
Surface supplied diving reduces the risk of getting lost under an overhead, as the umbilical provides a reliable guideline back to the entry point, and a reliable source of breathing gas with a low risk of out of air incidents, but it can be cumbersome, only allows a limited penetration distance based on available umbilical length and the ability of the diver to drag it along and the ability of the tenders to drag it back during exit, and can become snagged on obstructions or diverted through line traps. It may need one or more in-water tenders or guide hoops to avoid these problems, and it may not be possible for the standby diver to reach the diver within an acceptable time in an emergency. Another possible problem is hydrodynamic drag in a current.

== Equipment ==
All critical life-support equipment must be sufficiently redundant to allow escape in any reasonably foreseeable failure scenario.

== Skills, procedures, and training ==
Skills and procedures have been developed for managing the hazards and foreseeable contingencies associated with different circumstances of penetration diving and the equipment suitable for use in each environment. These are generally learned in training for diving in those specific environments, but most are applicable across a range of environments with similar hazards.
