= Ice diving =

Underwater diving under ice

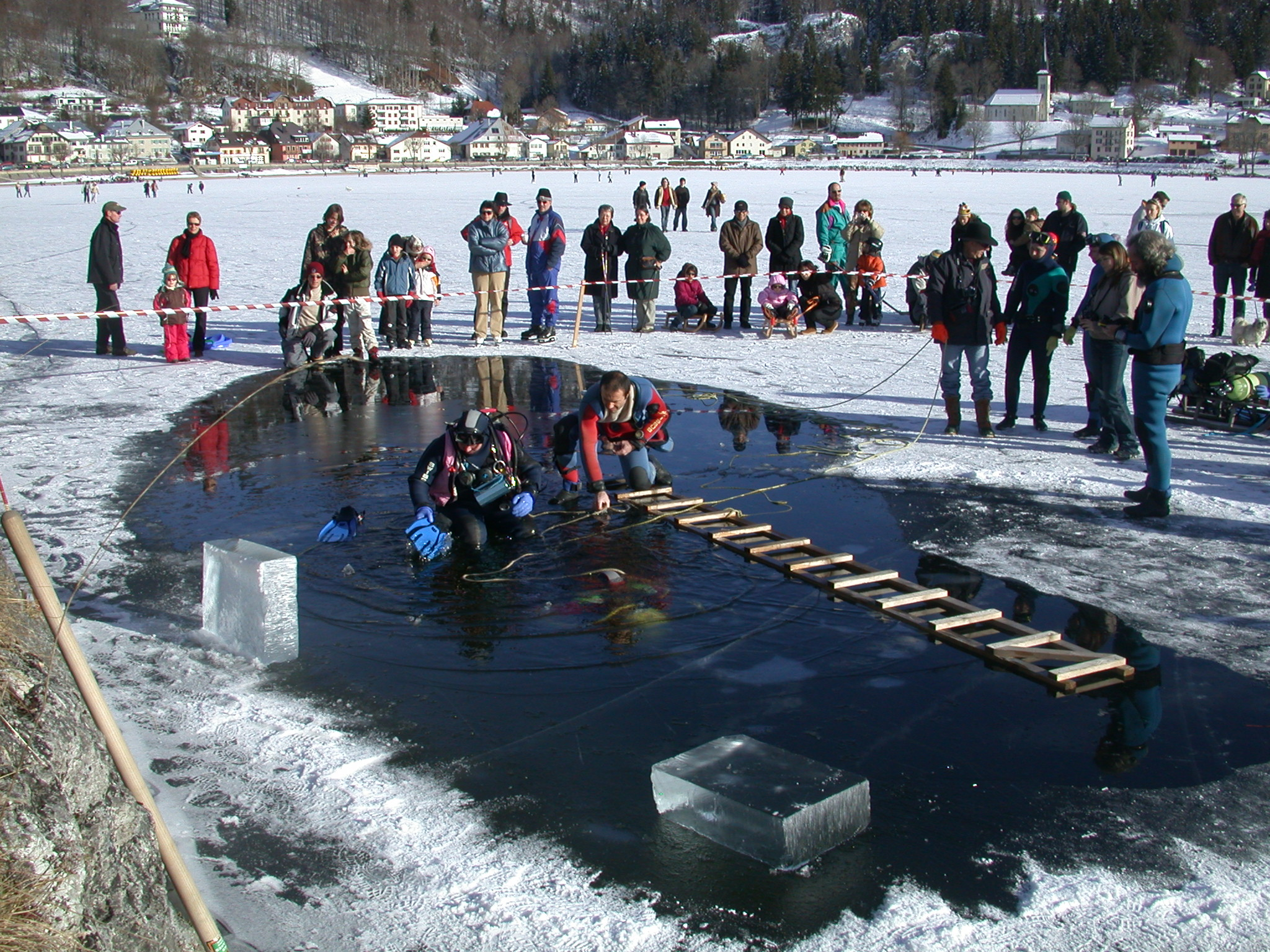

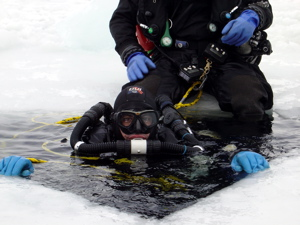
Ice diving - view from the top

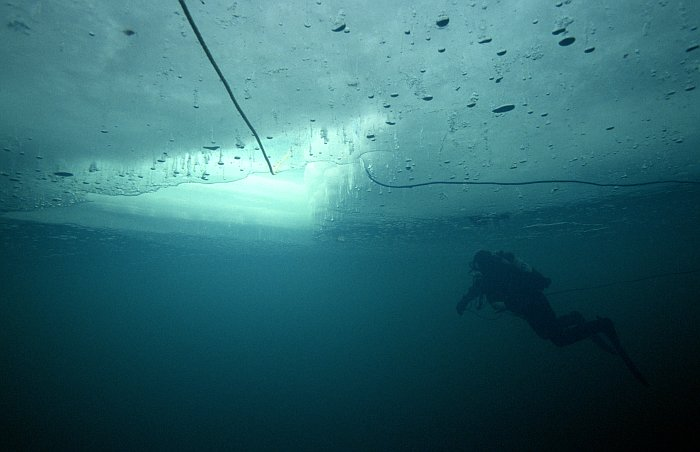
Under the ice - view from below

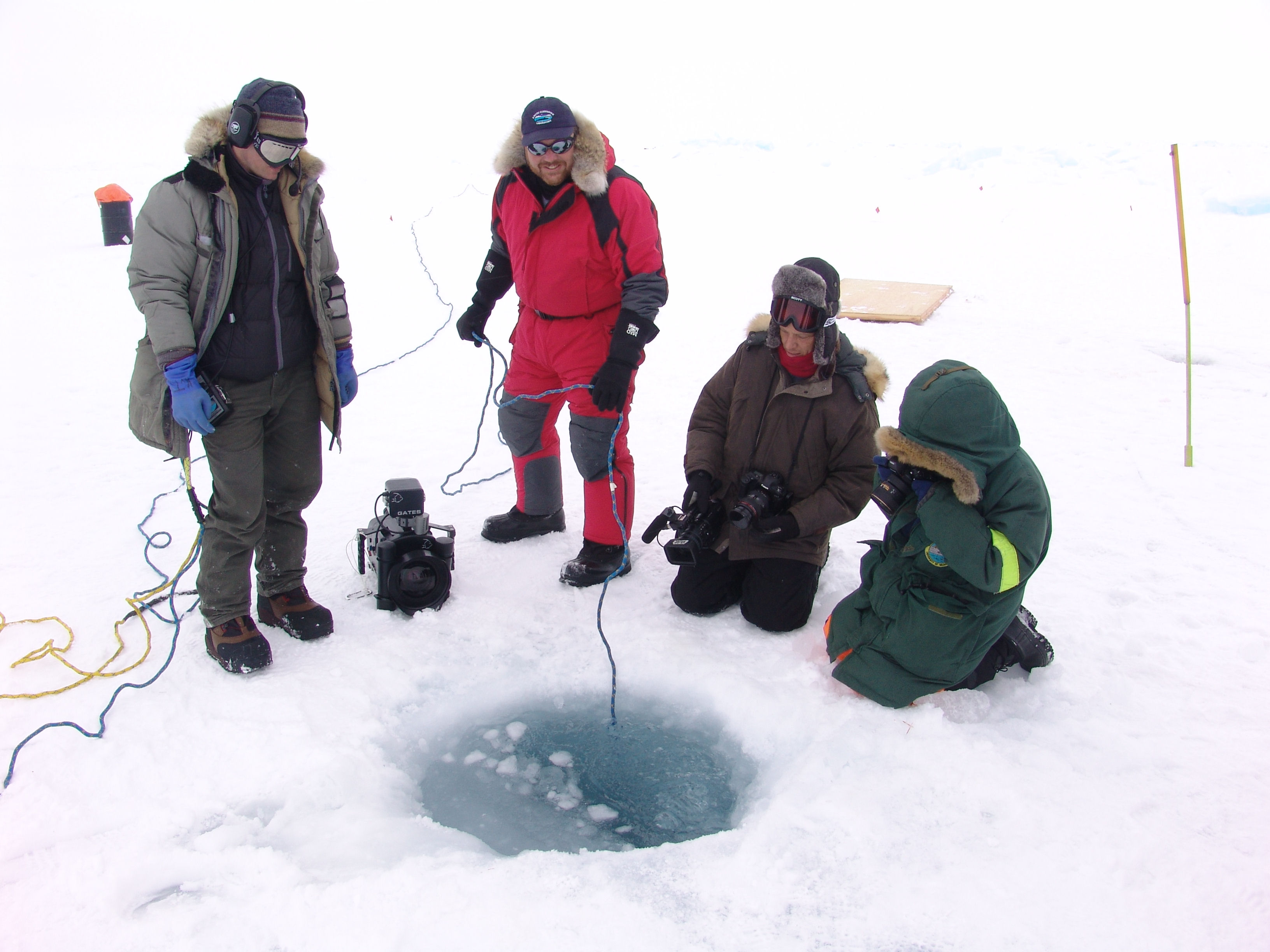
Monitoring an ice diver conducting studies below the ice.

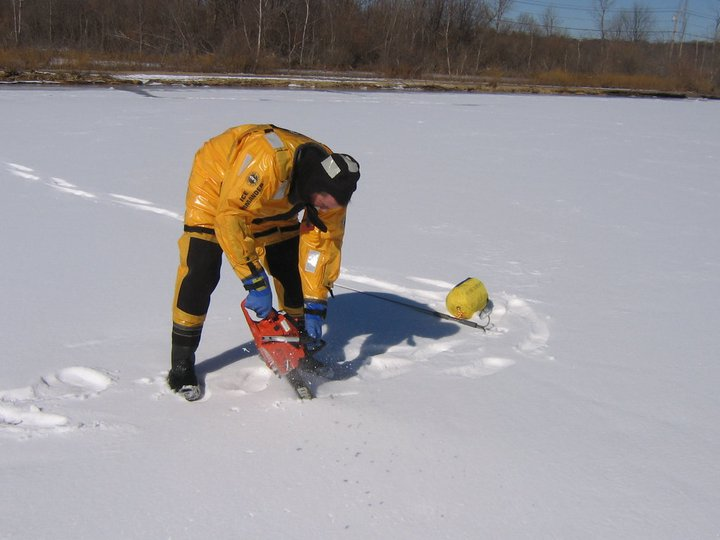
Cutting a hole in the ice to check the water conditions

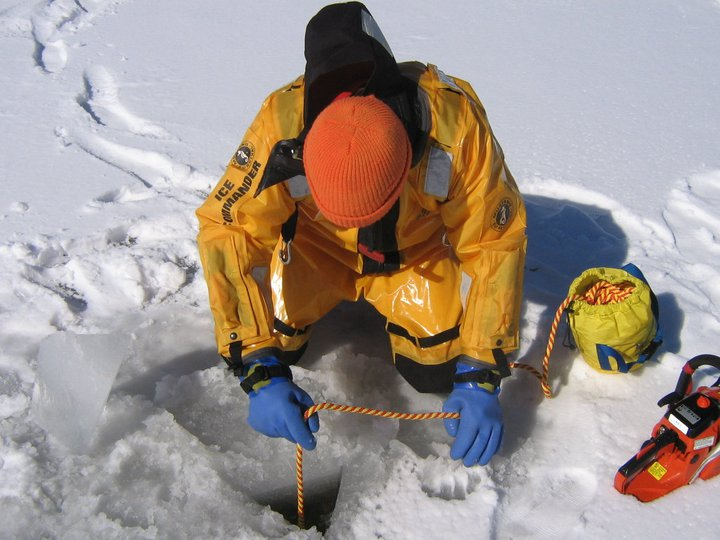
Checking water conditions through a small hole in the ice

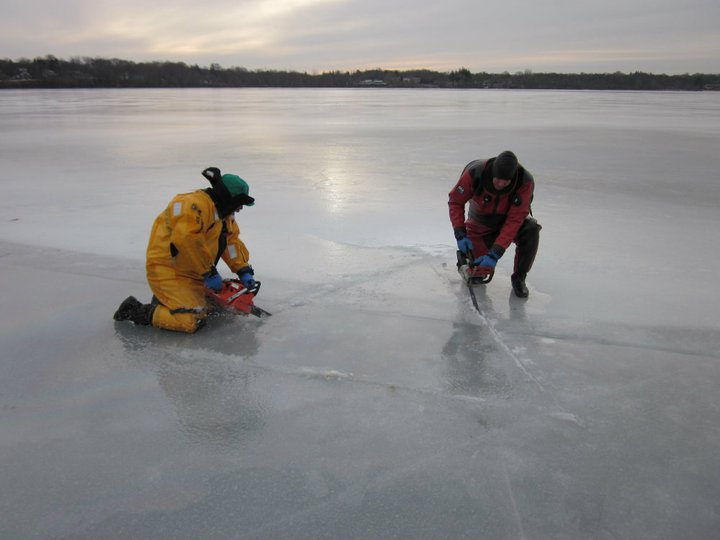
Cutting the ice hole with chainsaws

Ice diving is a type of penetration diving where the dive takes place under ice. Because diving under ice places the diver in an overhead environment typically with only a single entry/exit point, it requires special procedures and equipment. Ice diving is done for purposes of recreation, scientific research, public safety (usually search and rescue/recovery) and other professional or commercial reasons.

The most obvious hazards of ice diving are getting lost under the ice, hypothermia, and regulator failure due to freezing. Scuba divers are generally tethered for safety. This means that the diver wears a harness to which a line is secured, and the other end of the line is secured above the surface and monitored by an attendant. Surface supplied equipment inherently provides a tether, and reduces the risks of regulator first stage freezing as the first stage can be managed by the surface team, and the breathing gas supply is less limited. For the surface support team, the hazards include freezing temperatures and falling through thin ice.

== Environment ==
Ice diving is underwater diving in water partly or completely covered by ice which may be an overhead obstacle to surfacing at some point of the dive, making ice diving a subclass of penetration diving. This can be in fresh or seawater, and the salinity of the water constrains the possible temperature range of the water. In fresh water the coldest water is in contact with the ice, at 0 °C (32 °F), and the warmest may be 4 °C (39 °F), some distance below the ice, which is the temperature at which fresh water reaches its highest density. In sea water the temperature can be a little lower, around −2 °C (28 °F), depending on salinity. Air temperatures can be considerably lower.

== Hazards ==
Hazards of ice diving include the general hazards of underwater diving, the specific environmental hazards of penetration diving, in particular the hazard of not finding the exit area, and some hazards that are more specific to the low temperatures. There may also be hazards specific to the particular dive site.

- Low environmental temperatures can cause:
  - Frostbite:
  - Hypothermia:, which can reduce the mental acuity, reasoning capacity and cognitive function of the diver, possibly leading to accidents and work errors. More severe cases can be incapacitate the diver and are directly life-threatening.
  - Non-freezing cold injury
  - Regulator freezing:
- Entrapment by moving ice: When diving through a natural gap in ice cover, it may be possible for the separate floes to move relative to each other, under the influence of wind or water movement, which can change the geometry of the entry and exit area, creating a risk of closing the gap through which the diver must exit the water.
- Falling through weak ice cover: The ice layer may be flawed or insufficiently thick to support the load of the dive team.
- Slipping on ice: Diving gear is heavy out of the water, and the water on the diver's exposure suit can quickly freeze, reducing mobility and traction, and ice is an inherently slippery material.
- Wild animals like sharks and polar bears:

=== Regulator freezing ===
Regulator freezing is a malfunction of a diving regulator where ice formation on or in one or both stages causes the regulator to function incorrectly. Several types of malfunction are possible, including jamming of the first or second stage valves in any position from closed to more frequently fully open, which can produce a free-flow capable of emptying the diving cylinder in minutes, ice formation in the exhaust valve opening causing leakage of water into the mouthpiece, and shedding of ice shards into the inhalation air, which may be inhaled by the diver, possibly causing laryngospasm.

When air expands during pressure reduction in a regulator, the temperature drops and heat is absorbed from the surroundings. It is well known that in waters colder than 10 °C (50 °F) use of a regulator to inflate a lift bag, or to purge a regulator underwater for just a few seconds, will start many regulators free-flowing and they will not stop until the air supply to the regulator is stopped. Some cold water scuba divers install shuttle type (sliding sleeve) shut off valves at each second stage regulator so if the second stage freezes open, the low pressure air can be shut off to the frozen second stage allowing them to switch to the alternative second stage and abort the dive.

The most familiar effect of regulator freezing is where the second stage demand valve starts free flowing due to ice formation around the inlet valve mechanism that prevents the valve from closing after inhalation. Besides the problem of free flow from second stage icing, a less known problem is free ice formation, where ice forms and builds up inside the second stage but does not cause the regulator to free flow, and the diver may not be aware that the ice is there. This free ice build-up inside the second stage can break loose in the form of a sliver or chunk and pose a significant choking hazard because the ice can be inhaled, which may trigger laryngospasm. This can be a particular problem with regulators having ice-shedding internal surfaces that are teflon coated, which allows the ice to break free of the internal surfaces and helps to prevent the regulator from free flowing by clearing the ice. This may be helpful in keeping the demand valve mechanism free to move, but the ice still forms in the regulator and has to go somewhere when it breaks loose.

With most second stage scuba regulators, ice forms and builds up on internal components, and the gap between the valve lever and fulcrum point is reduced and eventually filled by the build-up of ice that forms, preventing the inlet from fully closing during exhalation. Once the valve starts leaking, the second stage components get even colder due to the cooling effect of the continuous flow, creating more ice and sometimes an even greater free flow. With some regulators the refrigerating effect is so great, that water around the exhaust valve freezes, reducing exhaust flow, increasing exhalation effort, and producing positive pressure in the valve body, making it difficult to exhale through the regulator. This may cause the diver to loosen their grip on the mouthpiece and exhale around the mouthpiece.

With some regulators, once the regulator starts free-flowing the flow escalates into a full free-flow, and delivers air to the diver at temperatures cold enough to freeze mouth tissue in a short time, causing frostbite. The effect increases with depth, and the deeper the diver is, the faster the breathing gas will be lost. In some cold water fatalities, by the time the diver's body is recovered there is no gas left in the cylinder, and the regulator has warmed up and melted the ice, destroying the evidence, and leading to a finding of death by drowning due to running out of gas.

==== Mechanism of icing ====
When the high pressure gas passes through the regulator first stage, the pressure drop from cylinder pressure to inter-stage pressure causes a temperature drop as the gas expands. The higher the cylinder pressure the greater the drop in pressure and the colder the gas gets in the low pressure hose to the second stage. An increase in flow will increase the amount of heat lost and the gas will get colder, as heat transfer from the surrounding water is limited. If the breathing rate is low to moderate (15 to 30 lpm) the risk of ice formation is less.

The factors that influence ice formation are:

- Cylinder pressure: - The temperature drop is proportional to the pressure drop. See general gas equation.
- Breathing or flow rate: - The heat loss is proportional to the mass flow of gas.
- Depth: - Mass flow is proportional to downstream pressure for a given volumetric flow.
- Water temperature: - Rewarming of the expanded gas and the regulator mechanism depends on water temperature, and the temperature difference between the gas and the water.
- Duration of flow:- During high flow rates heat loss is faster than rewarming, and gas temperature will drop.
- Regulator design and materials: - The materials, arrangement of parts, and gas flow in the regulator affect reheating and deposition of ice. The thermal conductivity of the regulator components will affect the rate of heat transfer.
- Breathing gas composition: - The amount of heat needed to raise the temperature depends on the specific heat capacity of the gas.

Once the water temperature drops below 3.3 °C (37.9 °F) there is not enough heat in the water to rewarm the components of the second stage being chilled by the cold gas from the first stage, and most second stages start forming ice.

The cold inter-stage air enters the second stage and is reduced to ambient pressure, which cools it further, so it chills the second stage inlet valve components to well below freezing and as the diver exhales, the moisture in the exhaled breath condenses on the cold components and freezes. Heat from the surrounding water may keep the second stage regulator components warm enough to prevent the build-up of ice. The diver's exhaled breath at 29 to 32 °C (84 to 90 °F), does not have enough heat to compensate for the cooling effect of the expanding incoming air once the water temperature is much below 4 °C (39 °F), and once the water temperature drops below 4 °C (39 °F) there is not enough heat in the water to rewarm the regulator components fast enough to keep moisture in the divers exhaled breath from freezing if the diver is breathing hard. This is why the CE cold water limit is at 4 °C (39 °F) which is the point at which many scuba regulators start retaining free ice.

The longer the gas expands at a high rate, the more cold gas is produced, and for a given rate of reheating, the colder the regulator components will get. Keeping high flow rates to as short a time as possible will minimise ice formation.

The air temperature above the ice may be considerably colder than the water under the ice, and the specific heat of air is much less than that of water. As a consequence, there is less warming of the regulator body and inter-stage gas when out of the water, and it is possible for further cooling to occur. This increases the risk of second stage icing, and the gas in the cylinder may be cooled sufficiently for condensation of residual moisture to occur during first stage expansion, as the expanding gas may cool below the −50 °C (−58 °F) dew point specified for high pressure breathing gas, which could cause internal icing of the first stage. This can be avoided by restricting breathing from the set in the cold air to a minimum.

A similar effect occurs with the second stage. Air which has already expanded and cooled through the first stage expands again and cools further at the demand valve of the second stage. This cools the components of the second stage and water in contact with them may freeze. Metal components around the moving parts of the valve mechanism allow heat transfer from the surrounding slightly warmer water, and from exhaled air from the diver, which is considerably warmer than the surroundings.

Second stage freezing can develop quickly from the moisture in the exhaled breath, so regulators that prevent or reduce contact of the diver's exhaled breath with the colder components and the area where the cold gas enters will usually build up less ice on critical components. The heat transfer qualities of the materials can also significantly influence ice formation and freezing risk. Regulators with exhaust valves that do not seal well will form ice quickly as ambient water leaks into the casing. All second stages can develop ice when the inlet gas temperature averages below −4 °C (25 °F) and this can happen in water temperatures up to 10 °C (50 °F). The ice that forms may or may not cause a free flow, but any ice inside the regulator casing may present an inhalation hazard.

A second stage freeze is also likely to happen with the valve open, causing a free flow, which may precipitate a first stage freeze if not immediately stopped. If the flow through the frozen second stage can be stopped before the first stage freezes, the process can be halted. This may be possible if the second stage is fitted with a shutoff valve, but if this is done, the first stage must be fitted with an over-pressure valve, as closing the supply to the second stage disables its secondary function as an over-pressure valve.

Cold water function testing is used to compare a regulator's performance in cold water against various standards, mainly the U.S. Navy Experimental Diving Unit's unmanned cold water test procedures (1994), and European CE open circuit standard EN 250 of 1993. Testing may include failure modes and effects analysis, and other issues relating to manufacturing, quality assurance and documentation. The introduction of a complete computerised breathing simulator system by ANSTI Test Systems Ltd in the UK made possible the accurate breathing simulator testing at all realistic water temperatures that is the current practice.

==== Surface supplied breathing equipment ====
In most cases surface supplied helmets and full face mask demand valves do not get cold enough to develop ice because the umbilical works as a heat exchanger and warms the air up to the water temperature. If the surface supplied diver bails out to scuba emergency gas supply, then the problems are identical to those for scuba, though the metal gas block and bent tube gas passages before the second stage will provide some warming of inter-stage gas beyond what a scuba set would normally provide.

If the surface air temperatures are well below freezing, (below −4 °C (25 °F)) excessive moisture from the volume tank can freeze into ice granules which can then travel down the umbilical and end up in the helmet intake, blocking off air to the demand valve, either as a reduction in flow or a complete blockage if the granules accumulate and form a plug. Ice formation in a surface supplied system can be prevented by use of an effective moisture separation system and regular draining of condensate. Desiccating filters can also be used. Use of HP gas for surface supply is not generally a problem as the HP compressors use a filter system that dries the air sufficiently to keep the dew point below −40 °C (−40 °F). Keeping the surface section of the umbilical exposed to the cold air as short as possible will also help. The portion in the water is not normally cold enough to be a problem.

==== Factors increasing the risk of regulator freeze ====
- Unsuitable regulator design and construction
- High flow rates through the regulator
  - Purging – affects both regulator stages.
  - Buddy breathing – affects both regulator stages.
  - Octo breathing – particularly effects the first stage if both second stages are supplied by the same first stage.
  - Filling a lift bag or DSMB from the breathing regulator – affects both stages.
  - long bursts of dry suit inflation or BC inflation while breathing from the same regulator – affects the first stage, and may cause freezing at the inflation valve.
  - High breathing rate due to exertion – affects both stages.
- Low water temperature
  - Water directly under the ice is likely to be colder than deeper water in fresh water.
- Breathing through the regulator above the ice in sub-freezing temperatures, where there is no warming of the regulator of interstage gas by ambient water – affects both stages.

==== Precautions to reduce risk of regulator freezing ====
- Keeping the interior of the second-stage completely dry before entering the water
  - Not breathing from the regulator until underwater. When testing the regulator before the dive, the diver can inhale only, avoid exhaling through the regulator as the moisture in the breath will freeze in the demand valve.
- Preventing water from entering the second-stage chamber during or between dives This requires keeping the regulator in the mouth while it is immersed.
- Depressing the purge button for no more than 5 seconds prior to or during the dive, and avoiding even this if possible
- Avoiding heavy work loads that would significantly increase the breathing rate and volume of air moved through the valve with each breathing cycle
- Ensuring that the scuba air is sufficiently moisture-free
- Keeping the regulator in warm surroundings prior to the dive, if possible.

==== Mitigation ====
Kirby Morgan have developed a stainless steel tube heat exchanger ("Thermo Exchanger") to warm the gas from the first stage regulator to reduce the risk of second stage scuba regulator freeze when diving in extremely cold water at temperatures down to −2.2 °C (28.0 °F). The length and relatively good thermal conductivity of the tubing, and the thermal mass of the block allows sufficient heat from the water to warm the air to within one to two degrees of the surrounding water.

==== Managing a regulator freeze ====
- The diver will close the cylinder valve supplying the frozen regulator and change over to breathing from the standby regulator. This conserves the gas and allows the frozen regulator time to defrost.
- If tethered, the diver can signal to the line tender with the previously agreed emergency signal (usually five or more tugs on the rope) while breathing from free-flowing regulator (less desirable option used if no alternative gas supply is available). Five pulls will usually indicate that the surface tender should pull the diver to the surface, or in this case, the hole in the ice.
- If diving without a tether the diver should follow the guideline back to the hole and avoid leaving the line unless able to use a jump line or can see the ice hole.
- Emergency ascent if directly under the hole in the ice and in visible range. (least desirable option short of drowning)

Protocol for a regulator freeze often includes aborting the dive.

==== Low pressure inflator freeze ====
It is possible for the dry suit or buoyancy compensator inflation valve to freeze while inflating, for similar reasons to regulator freeze. If this happens it can cause a runaway ascent if it is not dealt with immediately. If possible the low pressure inflator hose should be disconnected before it freezes onto the valve, while dumping air to control buoyancy. Excessive dumping of air may leave the diver too negative so it is preferable to have at least two controllable buoyancy systems, such as a dry suit and BCD, preferably supplied from different first stages. If the dry suit inflation valve freezes open it may allow water to leak into the suit once disconnected, so this usually results in aborting the dive.

Most inflator problems can be avoided by keeping gear maintained and dry before the dive, using a low flow rate for inflation and avoiding long bursts, and having warm water at the dive site to thaw gear since ambient air temperature is usually well below freezing and this usually causes BCD issues before the dive.

=== Wind chill ===
Temperatures above the ice may be considerably lower than water temperature, which is limited by freezing point of the water, and may be further exacerbated by wind chill. This can be a limiting factor on the endurance of the surface team if inadequately insulated and sheltered, and can have an impact on the divers on exiting the water in wet exposure suits.

Some types of plastic can become brittle at low temperatures and may shatter under impact. Subzero surface temperatures can freeze wet equipment, jamming zippers and locking glove attachment rings after exiting from the dive.

== Procedures ==
A team of 4 persons. The minimum personnel for ice diving.: 1. Team currently diving (1A. lead diver at line end; 1B. second diver and line handler; 1C. tender; 1D. first lifeline for communication, orientation and rescue, ~50–100 m); 2. Rescue diver (2A. fully equipped standby-diver, 2D. second lifeline); 3. Ice cover; 4. Ice screws to secure the line ends.; 5. Access opening in the ice cover.

A team of 6 persons. More secure than a team of 4.: 1. Team currently diving (1A. lead diver at line end; 1B. second diver and line handler; 1C. tender; 1D. first lifeline for communication, orientation and rescue, ~50-100m); 2. Rescue team (2A. fully equipped standby-diver; 2B. fully equipped line handler for the standby-diver; 2C. standby-tender; 2D. second lifeline); 3. Ice cover; 4. Ice screws to anchor the line ends.; 5. Access opening in the ice cover.

Site prepared for diving under ice: 1. Snowy surface.; 2. Radial lines from the hole cleared of snow for navigation aids under the ice.; 3. Work area cleared of snow.; 4. Triangular entry opening cut in the ice.; 5. First lifeline, prepared to support the divers.; 6. Second lifeline, prepared to support the standby team.; 7. Ice screws to anchor the rope ends.

Whether ice diving inherently constitutes technical diving has been debated within the recreational diving community., but since technical diving is legally recreational diving, it is unclear why this matters. For the recreational or professional diver it is a high risk environment requiring additional safety measures.

Ice diving is a team diving activity because each diver's lifeline requires a line tender. This person is responsible for paying out and taking in line so that the diver does not get tangled, and for rope signal communications with the diver. Professional teams will also require a stand-by diver and diving supervisor.

Under some circumstances a guide line can be used instead of a lifeline as a reference for the divers to return to the hole at the end of the dive or in an emergency in a similar way to cave diving or wreck penetration. In these cases the divers should be competent in procedures for diving with a guideline.

Polar diving experience has shown that buoyancy control is a critical skill affecting safety.

Typical procedure for a scuba dive under ice:

- A snow shovel is used to clear the snow and ice from the area.
- An ice saw or a chain saw is used to cut a hole in the ice.
- A weatherproof area is used for the divers to suit up.
- The diver and tender on the surface are connected by a rope lifeline and harness. The harness is typically put on over the dry suit but under the BC or other buoyancy device so that the diver remains tethered even if he or she must remove the air cylinder or buoyancy control device. The harness fits over the shoulders and around the back such that the tender on the surface can, in an emergency, haul an unconscious diver back to the hole. The harness should not be able to slide up or down the diver's torso when pulled in line with the body.
- Rope signals or voice communications systems must be used.
- A tethered standby diver is ready on the surface.
- One or two divers may dive at the same time from the same hole, each with their own rope. Using two ropes runs little risk of getting tangled together, but using three significantly increases this risk.
- If the regulator free-flows and freezes, the diver should close it down and switch to the backup, and terminate the dive.
- When diving in pack ice, the surface team must constantly monitor ice movement to ensure that the exit is not compromised.
- The diver must ensure that there is always a positive indication of the route to the exit area. A tether to a surface tender is usually preferable as it can be used to communicate, but if this is not practicable a reel and distance line is an alternative.
- The risk of attack by predators and aggressive wildlife should be considered. Polar bear, walrus, and leopard seal are potential hazards within their ranges.
- Gas management for an overhead environment is appropriate.
- Deployment of a single tethered scuba diver is a reasonably safe alternative to free-swimming buddy team diving. The tethered scuba diver is equipped with a full-face mask with voice communications, high capacity scuba air supply, and an independent emergency air supply. A lifeline with communications cable is secured to a body harness on the diver and is handled by a surface tender who is in constant voice communication with the diver. A similarly equipped standby diver is available on the surface.

== Equipment ==
Since diving under the ice takes place in cold climates, there is typically a large amount of equipment required. Besides each person's clothing and exposure-protection requirements, including spare mitts and socks, there is basic scuba gear, back-up scuba gear, tools to cut a hole in the ice, snow removal tools, safety gear, some type of shelter, lines, and refreshments required.

The diver can use a weight harness, integrated weight buoyancy control device, or a weight belt with two buckles on it so the weights can not be accidentally released which would cause a run-away ascent into the ice sheet.

Dry suits with adequate thermal undergarments are standard environmental protection for ice diving, though in some cases thick wetsuits may suffice. Hoods, boots and gloves are also worn. Full-face masks can provide more protection for the divers' facial skin.

=== Exposure suits ===
Because of the water temperature (between 4 °C and 0 °C in fresh water, approximately -1.9 °C for normal salinity sea water), exposure suits are mandatory.

- Pre- and post-dive thermal protection is critical for safety and diver function.
- Hand thermal protection is important to retain functionality and prevent cold injury.
- The diver should be kept warm throughout the dive, but active rewarming by external heating and heavy exercise should be avoided directly after the dive, as the effect of cold on risk of decompression sickness is not fully understood.

Some consider a dry suit mandatory; however, a thick wetsuit may be sufficient for hardier divers. A wetsuit can be pre-heated by pouring warm water into the suit. A hood and gloves (recommended three-finger mitts or dry gloves with rings) are necessary, and dry suit divers have the option of using hoods and gloves that keep their head and hands dry. Some prefer to use a full face diving mask to essentially eliminate any contact with the cold water. The biggest drawback to using a wet suit is the chilling effect on the diver caused by the water evaporating from the suit after a dive. This can be reduced by using a heated shelter.

=== Scuba equipment ===
Diving regulators suitable for cold-water are used. All regulators have a risk of freezing and free flowing, but some models fare better than others. Environmentally sealed regulators avoid contact between the surrounding water and the moving parts of the first stage by isolating them in an antifreeze fluid (e.g. Poseidon) or by siting the moving parts behind a diaphragm and transmitting the pressure through a pushrod (e.g. Apeks).

Although there is no universally accepted standard, at least one agency recommends the use of two non-freezing (rated for ice diving) regulators arranged as follows: primary first stage with primary second stage, BCD inflation hose, and submersible pressure gauge (SPG); secondary first stage with secondary second stage (octopus), dry suit inflation hose, and SPG, although only one SPG is needed for a single cylinder or manifolded twins.

The two first stages are mounted on independently closable valves, as a first stage freeze free-flow can only be stopped by shutting off the air supply from the cylinder until the valve has thawed out. The second regulator is there to supply the remaining gas when the first regulator is shut off. A second-stage isolation valve used in conjunction with a first-stage overpressure relief valve may be effective as a quick method to manage demand valve free-flow.

- Regulators should be checked to ensure that they perform effectively at low temperatures before use far from a free surface.
- A minimum of two independent regulators is recommended for diving under ice, as scuba apparatus has a tendency to free-flow under polar conditions Divers must be competent in change-over procedures, including shutdown of the free-flowing equipment.
- Keeping regulators warm and dry before diving, and limiting breathing from the regulator before immersion will reduce the risk of regulator freezing. Purging or any other cause of high flow rate markedly increases the probability of freezing and should be kept to an absolute minimum.

Redundant systems usually typically comprise double cylinders with a primary and alternate regulator. Each of the second stages is supplied its own first stage, which can be shut down at the cylinder valve in an emergency, such as a free flow. The diver's buoyancy compensator is on a different first stage to the dry suit so if there is an issue with one the diver can still control their buoyancy.

Some divers use a primary regulator on a 7-foot hose and a secondary on a necklace, this is useful when it may be necessary for the divers to swim in single file, though this is not always relevant for ice diving. The reason for the primary being on a long hose is to ensure the donated regulator is known to be working. The long hose will also allow some additional heat transfer from the water to the gas in the hose.

=== Buoyancy and weighting ===
- A drysuit should be used with a buoyancy compensator for ice diving unless the diver is exposed to greater risk with a buoyancy compensator than without one.
- A tethered diver, who is deployed to work independently, should preferably be equipped with full face mask, voice communications to the surface and redundant air supply. This is often obligatory for professional divers.
- Most divers prefer to be more negative for ice diving than in open water like in most overhead environments, and ability to disconnect the low pressure inflator on a BCD or drysuit is a critical skill.

=== Tethers and guidelines ===
When diving under ice it can be easy to become disoriented, and a guideline back to the entry and exit hole is an important safety feature. The choice between using a tether (lifeline) controlled by a surface tender or a reel line deployed by the diver under ice depends on various factors.

A tether connected to the diver and controlled by a surface tender is usually the safest option for most diving under ice, and the only reasonable choice when any significant current is present. The tether will prevent the diver from being swept away by current, and is generally strong enough for the surface party to pull the diver back to the hole unless it gets snagged. It may be the only option permitted by regulation or code of practice for professional divers on scuba. Recreational divers are not constrained by law or codes of practice, and there are a number of situations where experienced ice divers may choose to use a continuous guideline that is not attached to them, and which they control during the dive. This practice is more favoured for long penetration distances where entanglement and line fouling become greater risks. It is not recommended for divers new to the ice environment or for conditions which do not include very good visibility, no current, no moving ice and places to tie off the guideline along the route. A guideline may have advantages over a tether if:

- All of the divers have both significant penetration and ice diving skills and experience, and
  - The environment is stable, the ice is fast and there are no significant currents or other water movement, or
  - The dive is to be deep (below 40 metres (130 ft)) or the dive is planned for more than 66 metres (217 ft) total underwater distance from the entry point, where a long tether may be difficult to manage

Or:

- There is significant risk of entanglement if a tether is used

Divers may also choose to use a guideline for the primary part of the dive and clip on to a tether for decompression as currents are usually strongest near the surface.

=== Surface team ===
- Adequate thermal protection must be provided to tenders and standby divers.

- Warm waterproof shoes.
- Warm anorak for cold weather.
- Warm cap covering the ears.
- Sunglasses with a UV filter to protect the eyes in sunny days.
- Lip-care stick and cream to protect hands and face against cold and wind.
- A device like crampons to aid in traction on ice. especially when cutting the hole or carrying gear

== Location ==
Ice diving is generally done by recreational divers where the dive sites they use in summer freeze over in winter, and by public safety divers when necessary in the course of their occupation, mostly in emergencies. Most of these dives are done in North America and northern Europe where there is a large population of recreational divers, a large area of fresh water that can freeze over in winter, and sufficiently cold winters to form ice strong enough to use as a platform for diving. There is also some scientific diving under ice, mostly for biological and ecological research, and a small amount of extreme adventure ice diving by recreational divers, in exotic locations, like Antarctica.

=== Regions ===
Regions known for ice diving include the White Sea and Lake Baikal, in Russia, Antarctica, the Tromsø region in Norway, Resolute Bay and Baffin Island in Canada, the fjords and coastal waters around Greenland, and the Åland archipelago in Finland.

== Training and certification ==
Training includes learning about how ice forms, how to recognize unsafe ice conditions, dive site preparation, equipment requirements, and safety drills.

- Ice divers should be skilled in the use of drysuits, choice of thermal insulation, buoyancy control and weighting, and should be competent and experienced with the specific equipment they will use.
- If lifelines are used, both divers and tenders must be competent to use them.

Other skills required by the ice diver include:

- How to impact the underside of the surface ice if the diver's weight belt falls off for any reason and the diver ascends uncontrollably and rapidly.
- How to deal with a frozen air-supply system using a redundant back-up system.
- What to do in the event the diver loses contact with the line or the line tender does not get feedback from the diver in response to signals given to the diver.

Several agencies offer certification in recreational ice diving.

Specialised ice diving training for public safety divers in planning and executing emergency ice diving operations is available, as their duties may put them in the water under circumstances of greater risk than other professional and recreational divers. A minimum physical and medical fitness level is one of the prerequisites for the training. These divers are also trained in surface support activity necessary for risk management in these situations.
