= Scuba diving =

Swimming underwater, breathing gas carried by the diver

Recreational scuba diver

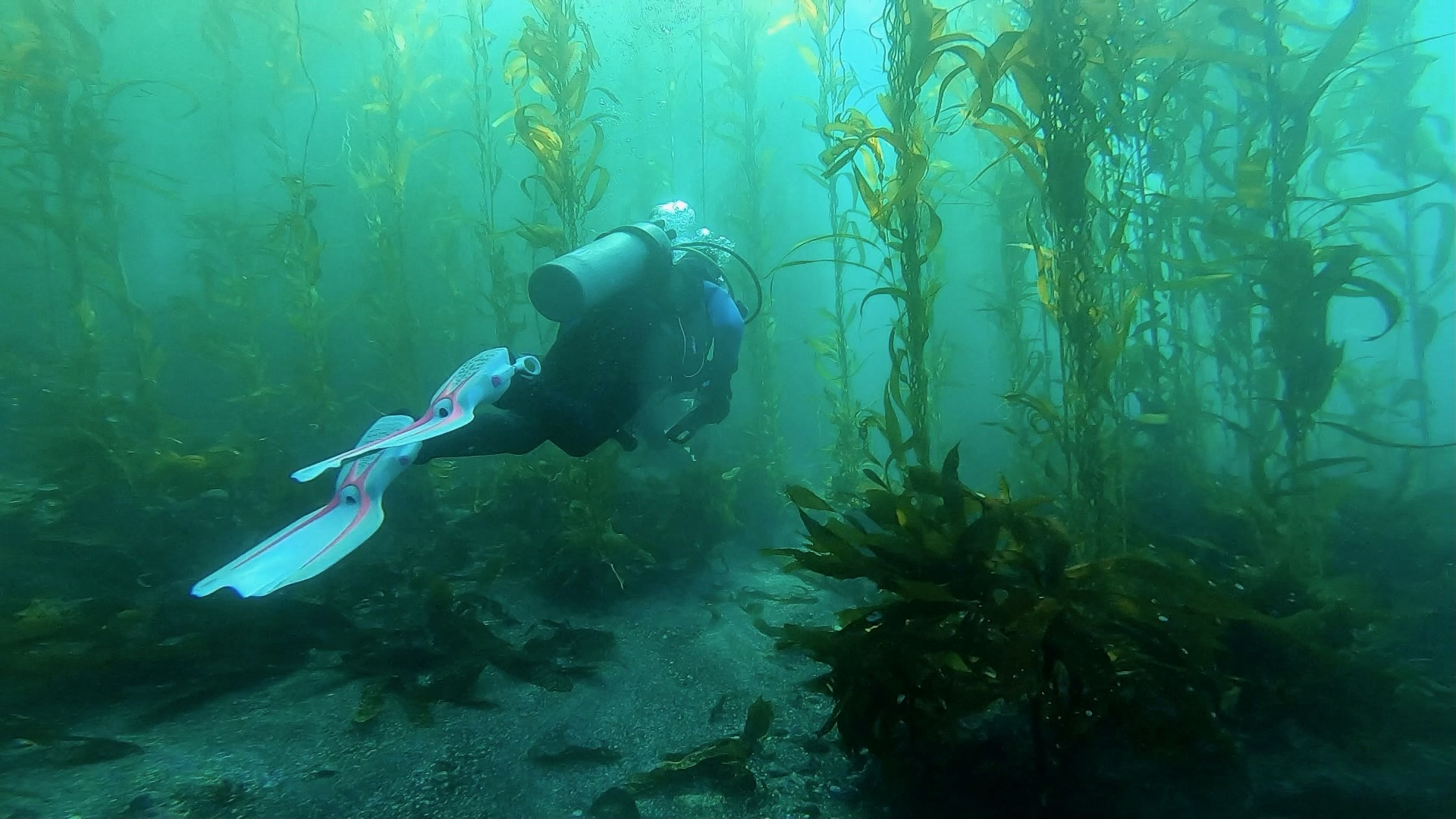
The undersea kelp forest of Anacapa Island off of the coast of Oxnard, California

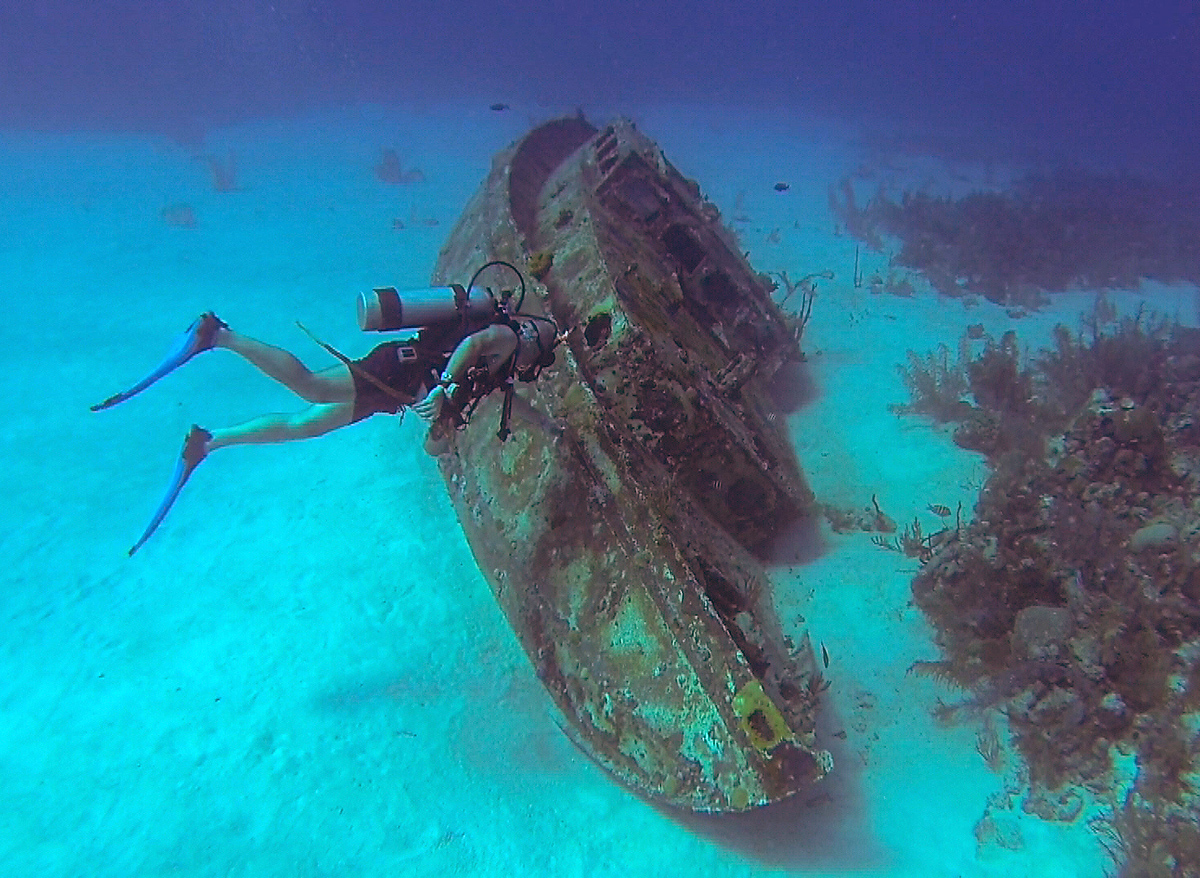
Diver looking at a shipwreck in the Caribbean Sea

Scuba diving is an underwater diving mode where divers use breathing equipment completely independent of a surface breathing gas supply, and therefore has a limited but variable endurance. The word scuba is an acronym for "self-contained underwater breathing apparatus" and was coined by Christian J. Lambertsen in a patent submitted in 1952. Scuba divers carry their source of breathing gas, affording them greater independence and movement than surface-supplied divers, and more time underwater than freedivers. Although compressed air is commonly used, other gas blends are also employed.

Open-circuit scuba systems discharge the breathing gas into the environment as it is exhaled and consist of one or more diving cylinders containing breathing gas at high pressure which is supplied to the diver at ambient pressure through a diving regulator. They may include additional cylinders for range extension, decompression gas or emergency breathing gas. Closed-circuit or semi-closed circuit rebreather scuba systems allow recycling of exhaled gases. The volume of gas used is reduced compared to that of open-circuit, making longer dives feasible. Rebreathers extend the time spent underwater compared to open-circuit for the same metabolic gas consumption. They produce fewer bubbles and less noise than open-circuit scuba, which makes them attractive to covert military divers to avoid detection, scientific divers to avoid disturbing marine animals, and media divers to avoid bubble interference.

Scuba diving may be done recreationally or professionally in several applications, including scientific, military and public safety roles, but most commercial diving uses surface-supplied diving equipment for breathing gas security when this is practicable. Scuba divers engaged in armed forces covert operations may be referred to as frogmen, combat divers or attack swimmers.

A scuba diver primarily moves underwater using fins worn on the feet, but external propulsion can be provided by a diver propulsion vehicle, or a sled towed from the surface. Other equipment needed for scuba diving includes a mask to improve underwater vision, exposure protection by means of a diving suit, ballast weights to overcome excess buoyancy, equipment to control buoyancy, and equipment related to the specific circumstances and purpose of the dive, which may include a snorkel when swimming on the surface, a cutting tool to manage entanglement, lights, a dive computer to monitor decompression status, and signalling devices. Scuba divers are trained in the procedures and skills appropriate to their level of certification by diving instructors affiliated to the diver certification organizations which issue these certifications. These include standard operating procedures for using the equipment and dealing with the general hazards of the underwater environment, and emergency procedures for self-help and assistance of a similarly equipped diver experiencing problems. A minimum level of fitness and health is required by most training organisations, but a higher level of fitness may be appropriate for some applications.

== History ==
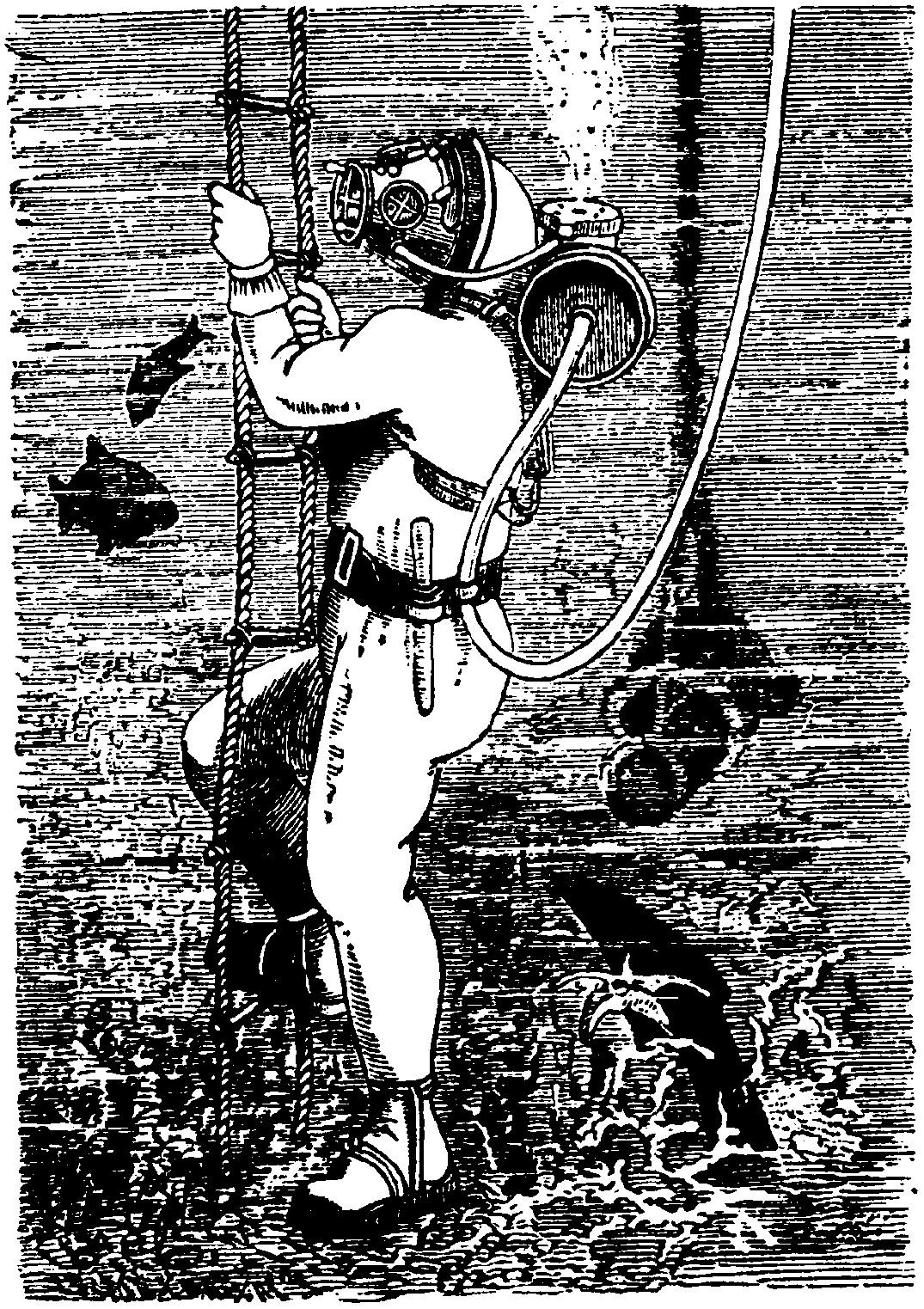
The Rouquayrol-Denayrouze apparatus was the first regulator to be mass-produced (from 1865 to 1965). In this picture the air reservoir presents its surface-supplied configuration.

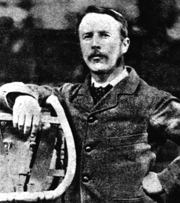
Henry Fleuss (1851–1932) improved the rebreather technology.

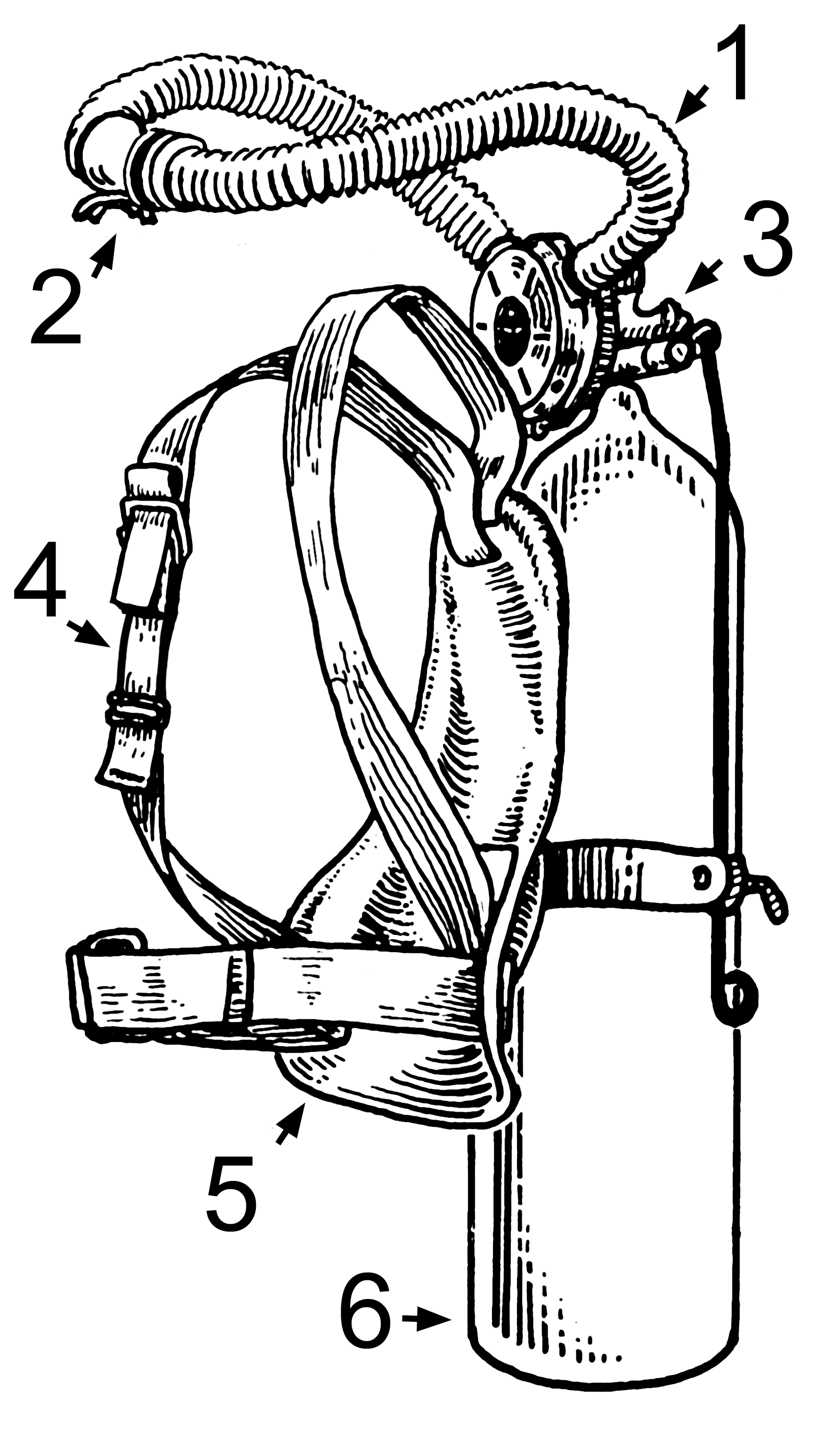
Aqualung scuba set: 1. Breathing hose; 2. Mouthpiece; 3. Cylinder valve and regulator; 4. Harness; 5. Backplate; 6. Cylinder

=== Origins ===
Although underwater diving in the mode of freediving has been practised for thousands of years, the history of scuba diving, closely linked with the history of scuba equipment, began in the 19th century. By the early twentieth century, two basic architectures for underwater breathing apparatus had been developed: open-circuit surface-supplied equipment, where the diver's exhaled gas is vented directly into the water; and closed-circuit scuba, where the diver's carbon dioxide is filtered from exhaled unused oxygen, which is then recirculated with additional oxygen. By the mid-twentieth century, high pressure gas cylinders were available and another system for scuba had emerged: open-circuit demand scuba, where the diver is supplied with gas on demand, and their exhaled breath is vented directly into the water. Oxygen rebreathers are severely depth-limited due to oxygen toxicity risk, which increases with depth, and the available systems for mixed gas rebreathers were fairly bulky, designed for use with diving helmets and often relied on a constant flow gas supply for driving recirculation.

The first commercially practical scuba rebreather was designed and built by the diving engineer Henry Fleuss in 1878, while working for Siebe Gorman in London. His self-contained breathing apparatus consisted of a rubber mask connected to a breathing bag, with an estimated 50–60% oxygen supplied from a copper tank and carbon dioxide scrubbed by passing it through a bundle of rope yarn soaked in a solution of caustic potash, the system giving a dive duration of up to about three hours. This apparatus had no way of measuring the gas composition during use. During the 1930s and all through World War II, the British, Italians and Germans developed and extensively used oxygen rebreathers to equip the first frogmen. The British adapted the Davis Submerged Escape Apparatus and the Germans adapted the Dräger submarine escape rebreathers, for their frogmen during the war. In the U.S. Major Christian J. Lambertsen invented an underwater free-swimming oxygen rebreather in 1939, which was accepted by the Office of Strategic Services. In 1952 he patented a modification of his apparatus, this time named SCUBA (an acronym for "self-contained underwater breathing apparatus"), which became the generic English word for autonomous breathing equipment for diving, and later for the activity using the equipment. After World War II, military frogmen continued to use rebreathers which do not make bubbles which would give away the presence of the divers. The high percentage of oxygen used by early rebreather systems limited the depth at which they could be used due to the risk of convulsions caused by acute oxygen toxicity.

Although a working demand regulator system had been invented in 1864 by Auguste Denayrouze and Benoît Rouquayrol, the first open-circuit scuba system developed in 1925 by Yves Le Prieur in France was a manually adjusted free-flow system with a low endurance, which limited its practical usefulness. In 1942, during the German occupation of France, Jacques-Yves Cousteau and Émile Gagnan designed the first successful and safe open-circuit scuba, known as the Aqua-Lung. Their system combined an improved demand regulator with high-pressure air tanks, and was patented in 1945. To sell his regulator in English-speaking countries Cousteau registered the Aqua-Lung trademark, which was first licensed to the U.S. Divers company, and in 1948 to Siebe Gorman of England. Siebe Gorman was allowed to sell in Commonwealth countries but had difficulty in meeting the demand, and the U.S. patent prevented others from making the product. The patent was circumvented by Ted Eldred of Melbourne, Australia, who developed the single-hose open-circuit scuba system in 1952, which separates the first stage and demand valve of the pressure regulator by a low-pressure hose, puts the demand valve at the diver's mouth, and releases exhaled gas through the demand valve casing.

=== Early equipment ===
Early scuba sets were usually provided with a plain harness of shoulder straps and a waist belt, and early scuba divers dived without a buoyancy aid. (Note: In The Silent World, a film shot in 1955, before the invention of buoyancy control devices, Cousteau and his divers are continuously using their fins to maintain depth.) In an emergency they had to jettison their weights. In the 1960s adjustable buoyancy life jackets (ABLJ) became available, which can be used to compensate for loss of buoyancy at depth due to compression of the neoprene wetsuit and as a lifejacket that will hold an unconscious diver face-upwards at the surface, and that can be quickly inflated. The first versions were inflated from a small disposable carbon dioxide cylinder, later with a small direct coupled air cylinder, and eventually with a low-pressure feed from the regulator first-stage to an inflation/deflation valve unit with an oral inflation valve for backup. The inflation system and a dump valve lets the volume of the ABLJ be controlled as a buoyancy aid. In 1971, the stabilizer jacket was introduced by ScubaPro. This class of buoyancy aid is known as a buoyancy control device or buoyancy compensator.

=== Configuration development ===
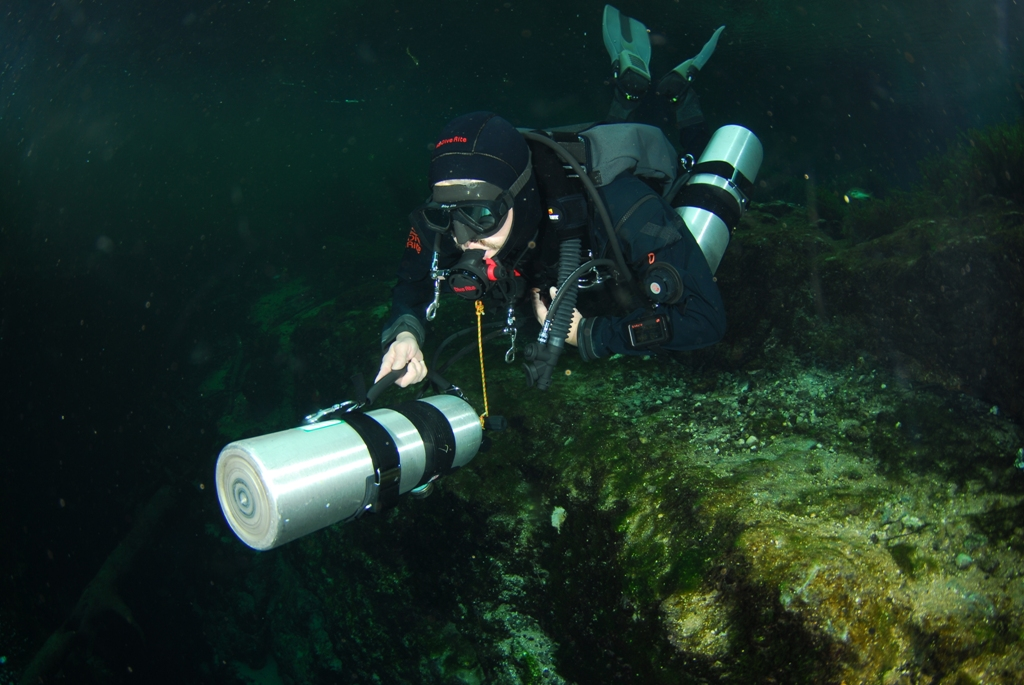
Sidemount diver pushing a cylinder in front

A backplate and wing is an alternative configuration of a scuba harness with a buoyancy compensation bladder mounted behind the diver, sandwiched between the backplate and the cylinder or cylinders. This arrangement became popular with cave divers making long or deep dives, who needed to carry several extra cylinders, as it clears the front and sides of the diver for other equipment to be attached in the region where it is easily accessible. Sidemount is a scuba diving equipment configuration which has basic scuba sets, each comprising a single cylinder with a dedicated regulator and pressure gauge, mounted alongside the diver, clipped to the harness below the shoulders and along the hips, instead of on the back of the diver. It originated as a configuration for advanced cave diving, as it facilitates penetration of tight sections of caves since sets can be easily removed and remounted when necessary. The configuration allows easy access to cylinder valves and provides easy and reliable gas redundancy. These benefits for operating in confined spaces were also recognized by divers who made wreck diving penetrations. Sidemount diving has grown in popularity within the technical diving community for general decompression diving, and has become a popular specialty for recreational diving.

=== Alternative breathing gases and technical diving ===
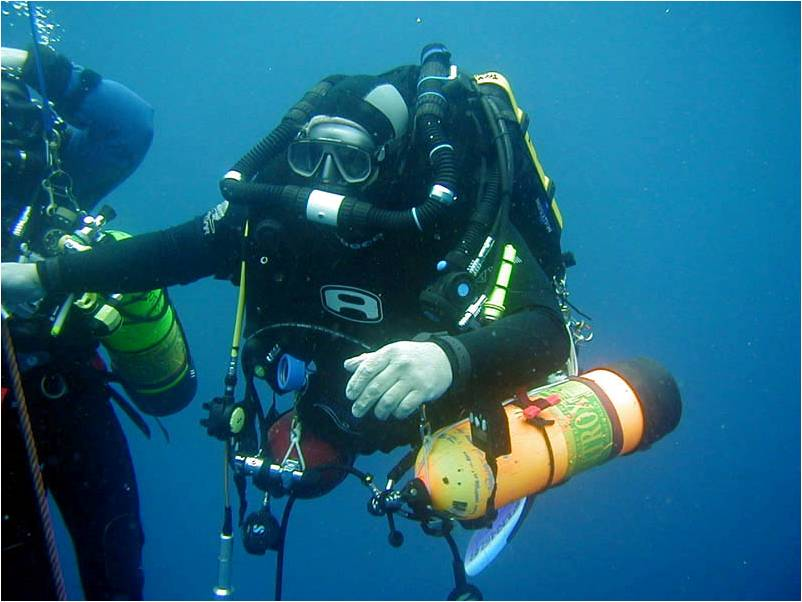
Rebreather diver returning from a 600 ft (183 m) dive

In the 1950s the United States Navy (USN) documented enriched oxygen gas procedures for military use of what is today called nitrox, and in 1970, Morgan Wells of NOAA began instituting diving procedures for oxygen-enriched air. In 1979 NOAA published procedures for the scientific use of nitrox in the NOAA Diving Manual. In 1985 IAND (International Association of Nitrox Divers) began teaching nitrox use for recreational diving. This was considered dangerous by some, and met with heavy skepticism by the diving community. Nevertheless, in 1992 NAUI became the first existing major recreational diver training agency to sanction nitrox, and eventually, in 1996, the Professional Association of Diving Instructors (PADI) announced full educational support for nitrox. The use of a single nitrox mixture has become part of recreational diving, and multiple gas mixtures are common in technical diving to reduce overall decompression time.

Technical diving is recreational scuba diving that exceeds the generally accepted recreational limits and may expose the diver to hazards beyond those normally associated with recreational diving, and to greater risks of serious injury or death. These risks may be reduced by appropriate skills, knowledge and experience, and by using suitable equipment and procedures. The concept and term are both relatively recent advents, although divers had already been engaging in what is now commonly referred to as technical diving for decades. One reasonably widely held definition is that any dive in which at some point of the planned profile it is not physically possible or physiologically acceptable to make a direct and uninterrupted vertical ascent to surface air is a technical dive. The equipment often involves breathing gases other than air or standard nitrox mixtures, multiple gas sources, and different equipment configurations. Over time, some equipment and techniques developed for technical diving have become more widely accepted for recreational diving.

In 1924 the US Navy started to investigate the possibility of using helium in breathing gases, and after animal experiments, human subjects breathing heliox 20/80 % (20% oxygen, 80% helium) were successfully decompressed from deep dives, In 1963 saturation dives using trimix were made during Project Genesis, and in 1979 a research team at the Duke University Medical Center Hyperbaric Laboratory started work which identified the use of trimix to prevent the symptoms of high-pressure nervous syndrome. Cave divers started using trimix to allow deeper dives and it was used extensively in the 1987 Wakulla Springs Project and spread to the north-east American wreck diving community and then worldwide.

The challenges of deeper dives and longer penetrations and the large amounts of breathing gas necessary for these dive profiles and ready availability of oxygen-sensing cells beginning in the late 1980s led to a resurgence of interest in rebreather diving. By accurately measuring the partial pressure of oxygen, it became possible to maintain and accurately monitor a breathable gas mixture in the loop at any depth. In the mid-1990s semi-closed circuit rebreathers became available for the recreational scuba market, followed by closed circuit rebreathers around the turn of the millennium. Rebreathers are currently manufactured for the military, technical and recreational scuba markets, but remain less popular, less reliable, more complex to operate, and more expensive than open-circuit equipment.

== Equipment ==
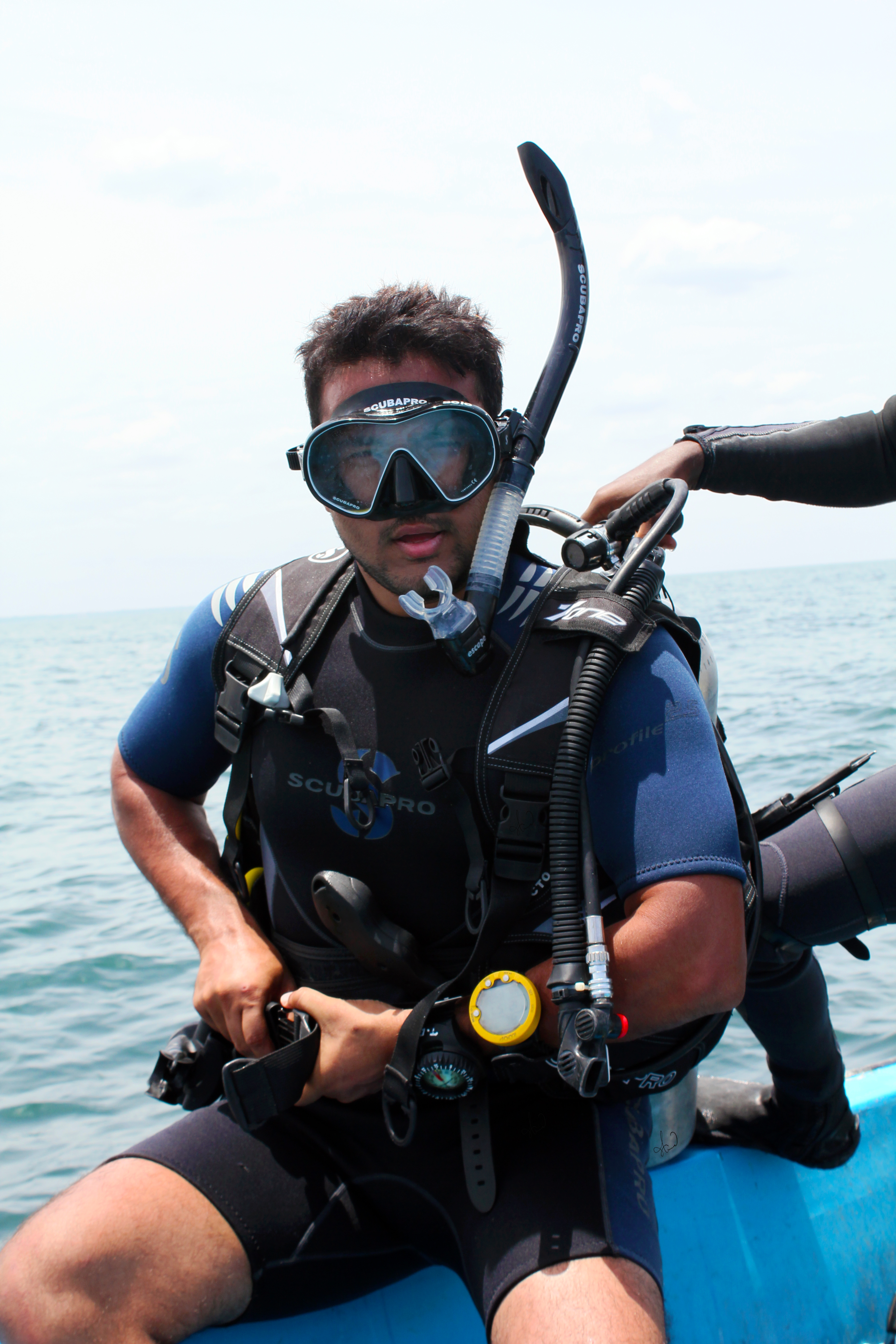
Recreational diver in short wetsuit and basic scuba equipment

Scuba diving equipment, also known as scuba gear, is the equipment used by a scuba diver for the purpose of diving, and includes the breathing apparatus, diving suit, buoyancy control and weighting systems, fins for mobility, mask for improving underwater vision, and a variety of safety equipment and other accessories.

=== Breathing apparatus ===
The defining equipment used by a scuba diver is the eponymous scuba, the self-contained underwater breathing apparatus which allows the diver to breathe while diving, and is transported by the diver. It is also commonly referred to as the scuba set.

Breathing gas must be supplied to the diver at ambient pressure, which is the sum of atmospheric pressure on the surface and the hydrostatic pressure due to the weight of the water above the diver. The gas may be delivered via a mouthpiece held by the teeth or a full-face mask which covers the eyes, nose and mouth, and may allow the diver to breathe through the nose and protect the diver's airway if the diver loses consciousness.

==== Open-circuit ====
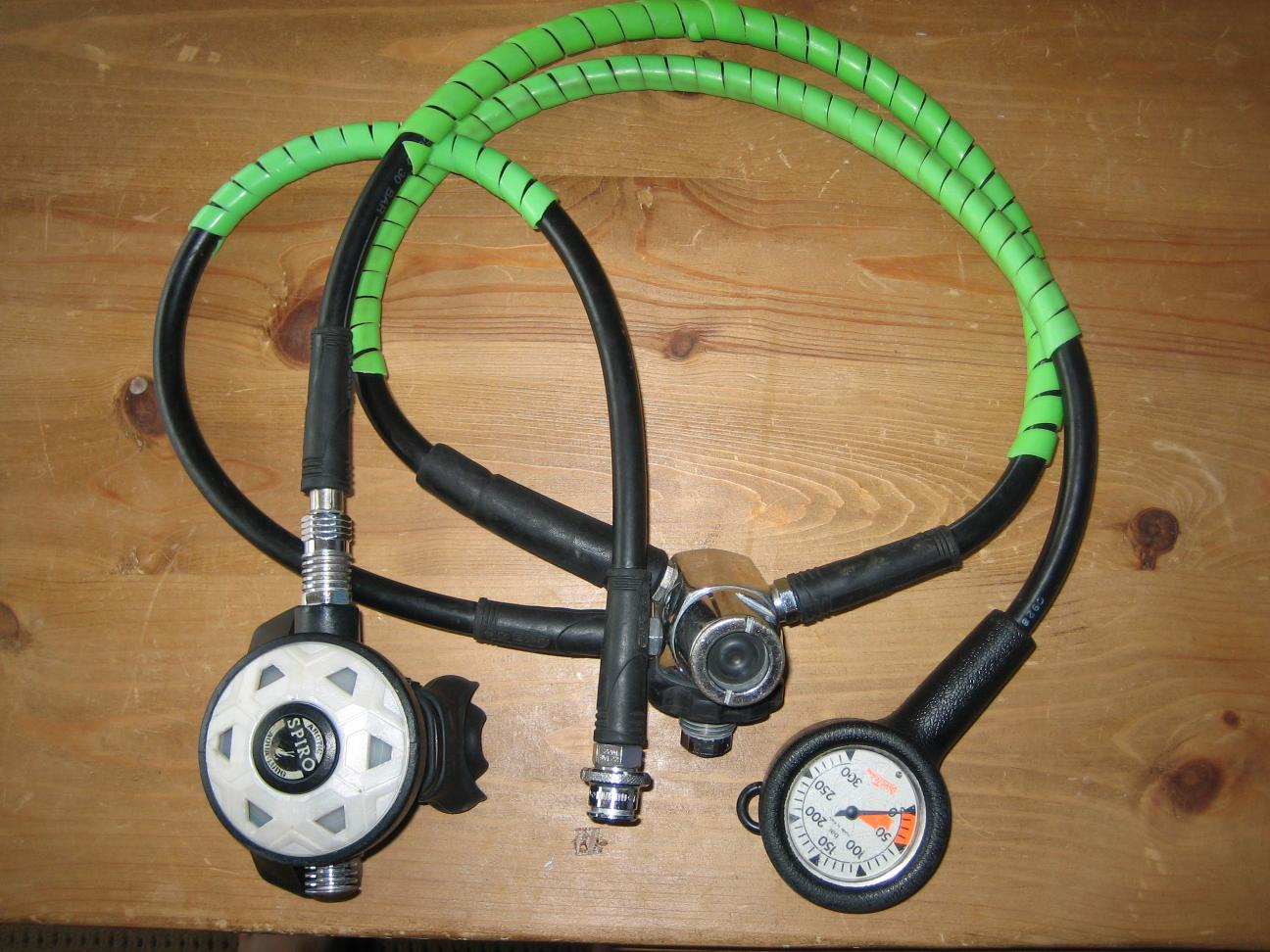
Diving regulator assembly, with DIN connector first stage, single second stage, inflator hose and submersible pressure gauge

Open-circuit scuba discharges the gas inhaled from the scuba equipment directly to the environment, or occasionally into another item of equipment for a special purpose, usually to increase the buoyancy of a lifting device such as a buoyancy compensator, inflatable surface marker buoy or small lifting bag. The breathing gas is generally provided from a high-pressure diving cylinder through a scuba regulator. By always providing the appropriate breathing gas at ambient pressure, demand valve regulators ensure the diver can inhale and exhale naturally and without unnecessary effort, regardless of depth, as and when needed.

The most commonly used scuba set configuration uses a "single-hose" open-circuit 2-stage demand regulator, connected to a single back-mounted high-pressure gas cylinder, with the first stage connected to the cylinder valve and the second stage at the mouthpiece. This arrangement differs from Émile Gagnan's and Jacques Cousteau's original 1942 "twin-hose" design, known as the Aqualung, in which the cylinder pressure was reduced to ambient pressure in one or two stages which were all in the housing mounted to the cylinder valve or manifold. The "single-hose" system has significant advantages over the original system for most applications.

In the "single-hose" two-stage design, the first stage regulator reduces the cylinder pressure of up to about 300 bars (4,400 psi) to an intermediate pressure (IP) of about 8 to 10 bars (120 to 150 psi) above ambient pressure. The second stage demand valve regulator, supplied by a low-pressure hose from the first stage, delivers the breathing gas at ambient pressure to the diver's mouth. The exhaled gases are exhausted directly to the environment as waste through a non-return valve on the second stage housing. The first stage typically has at least one outlet port delivering gas at full tank pressure which is connected to the diver's submersible pressure gauge or dive computer, or a wireless pressure transmitter, to show how much breathing gas remains in the cylinder.

==== Rebreather ====
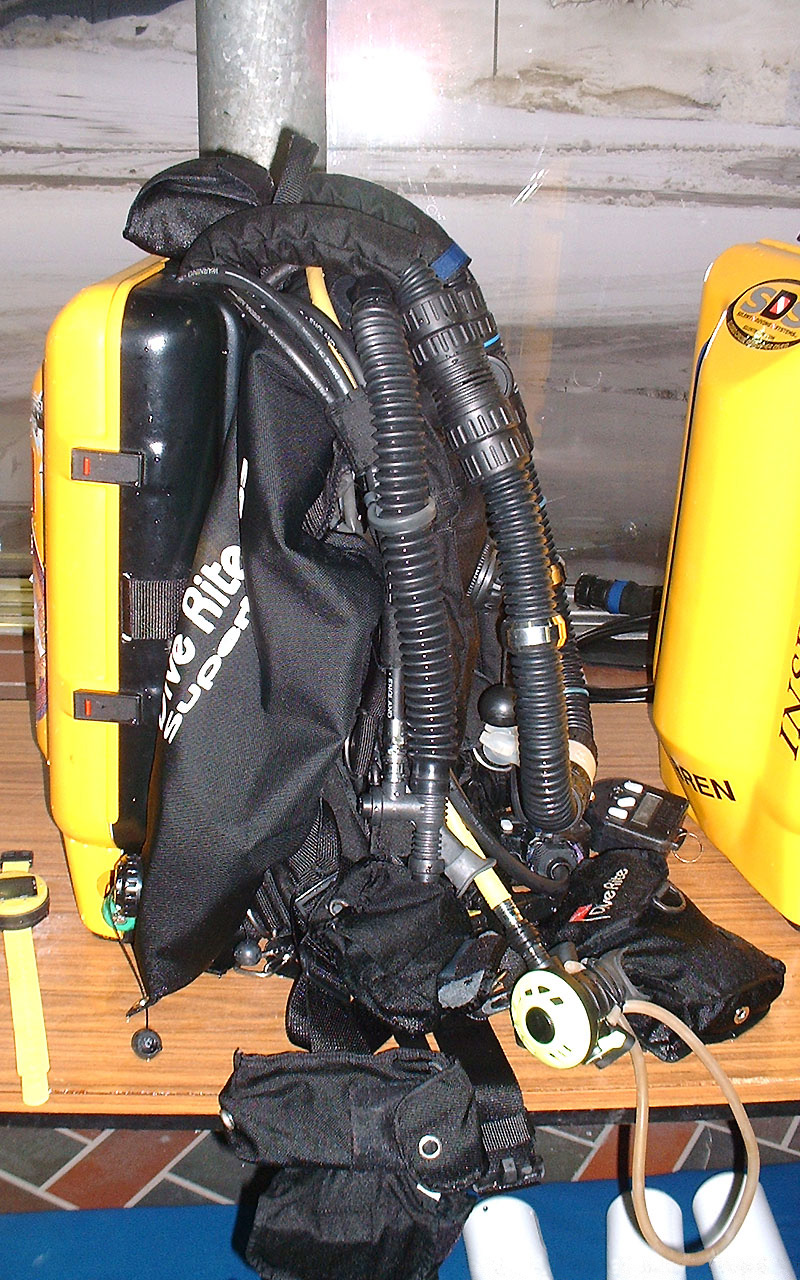
An Inspiration electronic fully closed circuit rebreather

Less common are closed circuit (CCR) and semi-closed (SCR) rebreathers which, unlike open-circuit sets that vent off all exhaled gases, process all or part of each exhaled breath for reuse by removing the carbon dioxide and replacing the oxygen used by the diver. Rebreathers release little or no gas bubbles into the water, and use much less stored gas volume for an equivalent depth and time because exhaled gas is recovered; this has advantages for research, military, photography, and other applications. Rebreathers are more complex and more expensive than open-circuit scuba, and special training and correct maintenance are required for them to be safely used, due to the larger variety of potential failure modes.

In a closed-circuit rebreather the oxygen partial pressure in the rebreather is controlled, so it can be maintained at a relatively high safe constant level, which reduces the inert gas (nitrogen and/or helium) partial pressure in the breathing loop. Minimizing the inert gas loading of the diver's tissues for a given dive profile reduces the decompression obligation. This requires continuous monitoring of actual partial pressures with time and for maximum effectiveness requires real-time computer processing by the diver's decompression computer. Tissue gas loads can be much reduced compared to fixed ratio gas mixes used in open circuit scuba systems, and as a result, divers can stay down longer or require less time to decompress. A semi-closed circuit rebreather injects a constant mass flow of a fixed breathing gas mixture into the breathing loop, or replaces a specific percentage of the respired volume, so the partial pressure of oxygen at any time during the dive depends on the diver's oxygen consumption and/or breathing rate. Planning decompression requirements requires a more conservative approach for a SCR than for a CCR, but decompression computers with a real-time oxygen partial pressure input can optimize decompression for these systems. Because rebreathers produce very little volume of exhaust bubbles, they do not disturb marine life or make a diver's presence known at the surface; this is useful for underwater photography, and for covert work.

==== Gas mixtures ====
A cylinder decal to indicate that the contents are a Nitrox mixture

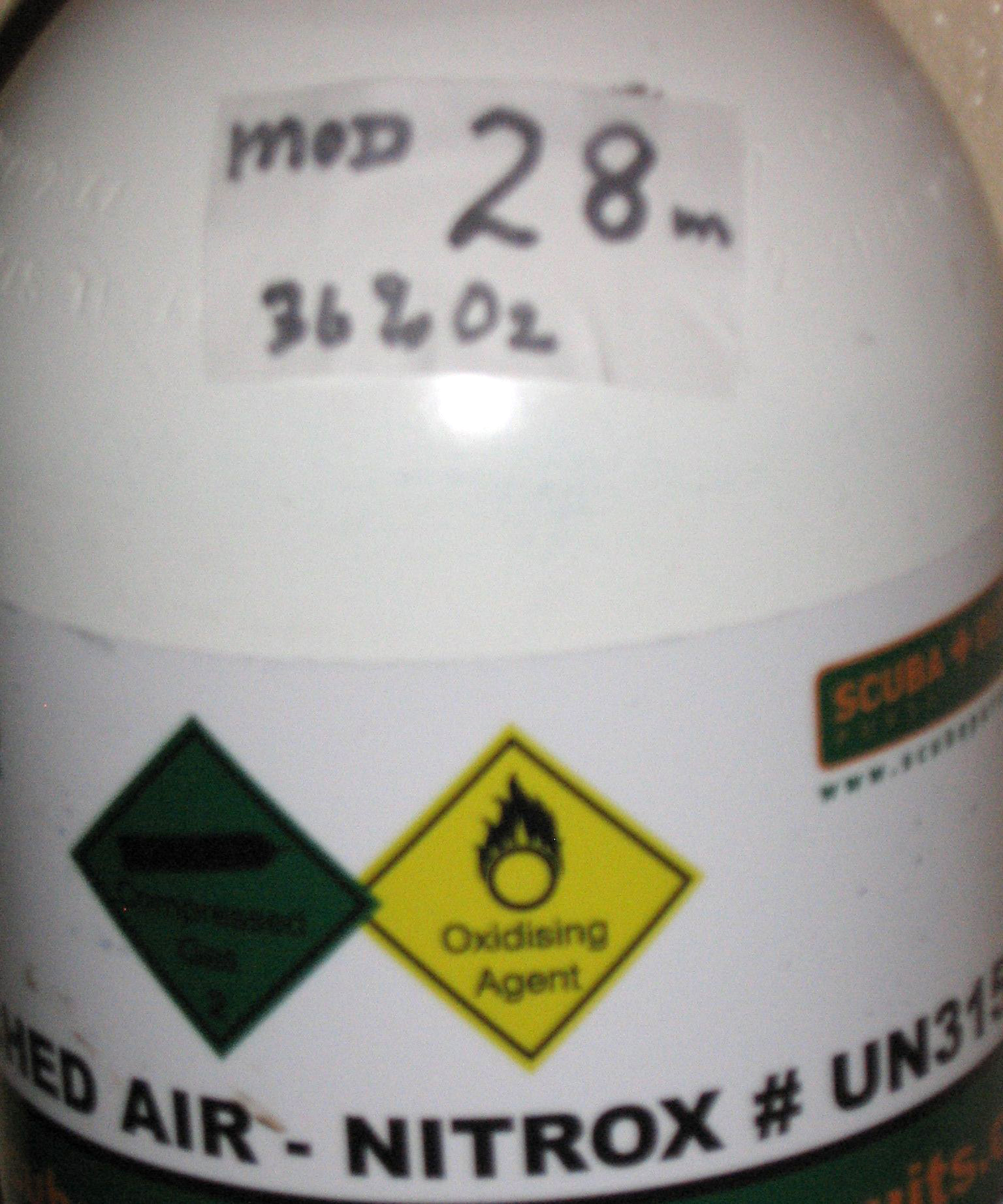
Nitrox cylinder marked up for use showing maximum safe operating depth (MOD)

For some diving, gas mixtures other than normal atmospheric air (21% oxygen, 78% nitrogen, 1% trace gases) can be used, so long as the diver is competent in their use. The most commonly used mixture is nitrox, also called Enriched Air Nitrox (EAN or EANx), which is air with extra oxygen, often with 32% or 36% oxygen, and thus less nitrogen, reducing the risk of decompression sickness or allowing longer exposure to the same pressure for equal risk. The reduced nitrogen may also allow for no stops or shorter decompression stop times or a shorter surface interval between dives.

The increased partial pressure of oxygen due to the higher oxygen content of nitrox increases the risk of oxygen toxicity, which becomes unacceptable below the maximum operating depth of the mixture. To displace nitrogen without the increased oxygen concentration, other diluent gases can be used, usually helium, when the resultant three gas mixture is called trimix, and when the nitrogen is fully substituted by helium, heliox.

For dives requiring long decompression stops, divers may carry cylinders containing different gas mixtures for the various phases of the dive, typically designated as travel, bottom, and decompression gases. These different gas mixtures may be used to extend bottom time, reduce inert gas narcotic effects, and reduce decompression times. Back gas refers to any gas carried on the diver's back, usually bottom gas.

=== Diver mobility ===
A scuba diver in an aquarium tank

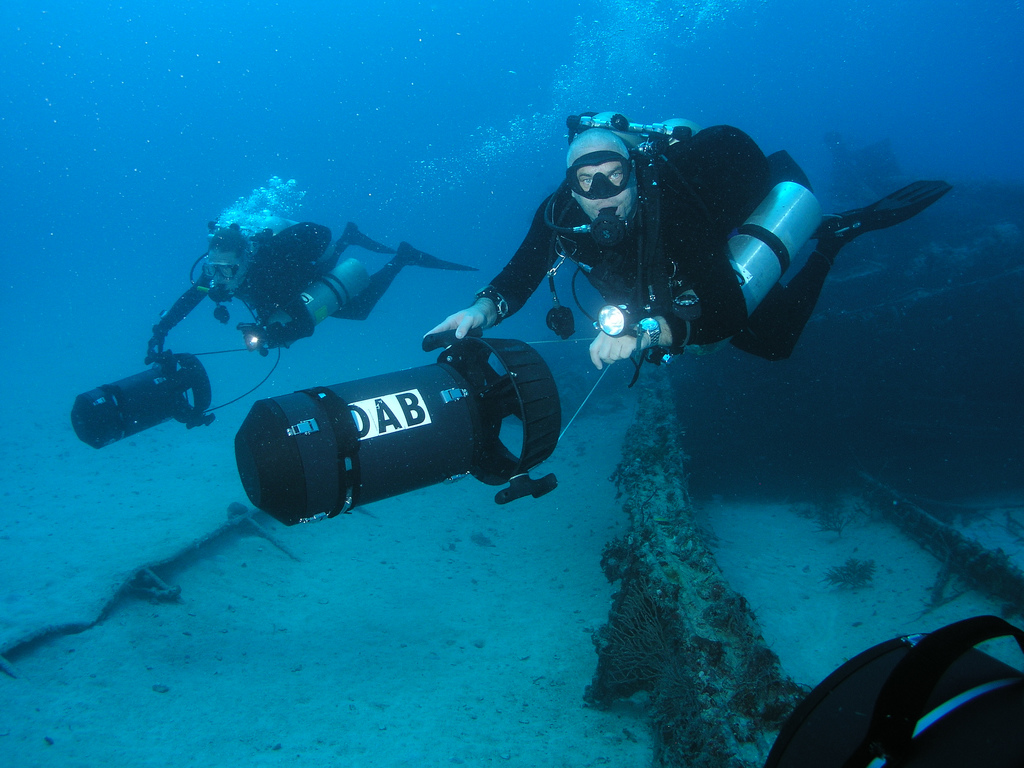
Divers using diver propulsion vehicles (scooters)

To take advantage of the freedom of movement afforded by scuba equipment, the diver needs to be mobile underwater. Personal mobility is enhanced by swimfins and optionally diver propulsion vehicles. Fins have a large blade area and use the more powerful leg muscles, so are much more efficient for propulsion and maneuvering thrust than arm and hand movements, but require skill to provide fine control. Several types of fin are available, some of which may be more suited for maneuvering, alternative kick styles, speed, endurance, reduced effort or ruggedness. Neutral buoyancy will allow propulsive effort to be directed in the direction of intended motion and will reduce induced drag. Streamlining dive gear will also reduce drag and improve mobility. Balanced trim which allows the diver to align in any desired direction also improves streamlining by presenting the smallest section area to the direction of movement and allowing propulsion thrust to be used more efficiently.

Occasionally a diver may be towed using a "sled", an unpowered device towed behind a surface vessel that conserves the diver's energy and allows more distance to be covered for a given air consumption and bottom time. The depth is usually controlled by the diver by using diving planes or by tilting the whole sled. Some sleds are faired to reduce drag on the diver.

=== Buoyancy control equipment ===
Buoyancy control is a critical skill for safety, and as the typical scuba diver with their basic equipment is not inherently neutrally buoyant, other equipment is used to allow control of buoyancy. Most excess buoyancy is due to the diving suit volume, and this varies with suit thermal insulation and depth. The ability to ascend at a controlled rate and remain at a constant depth is important for correct decompression. Recreational divers who do not incur decompression obligations can get away with imperfect buoyancy control, but when long decompression stops at specific depths are required, the risk of decompression sickness is increased by depth variations while at a stop. Decompression stops are typically done when the breathing gas in the cylinders has been largely used up, and the reduction in weight of the cylinders increases the buoyancy of the diver. Enough ballast weight must be carried to allow the diver to decompress at the end of the dive with nearly empty cylinders, and enough buoyancy compensation must be possible to remain at the surface before the dive with full cylinders.

==== Diver weighting ====
Scuba diving equipment can make the diver buoyant, requiring the addition of ballast to make it possible to submerge and remain submerged until the diver wants to surface. The amount and distribution of dive weights affects the convenience, efficiency, environmental impact, and safety of the diver.

Buoyancy changes with depth variation are proportional to the compressible part of the volume of the diver and equipment, and to the proportional change in pressure, which is greater per unit of depth near the surface. Minimizing the volume of gas required in the buoyancy compensator will minimize the buoyancy fluctuations with changes in depth. This can be achieved by accurate selection of ballast weight, which should be the minimum to allow neutral buoyancy with depleted gas supplies at the surface at the end of the dive unless there is an operational requirement for greater negative buoyancy during the dive.

==== Buoyancy compensator ====
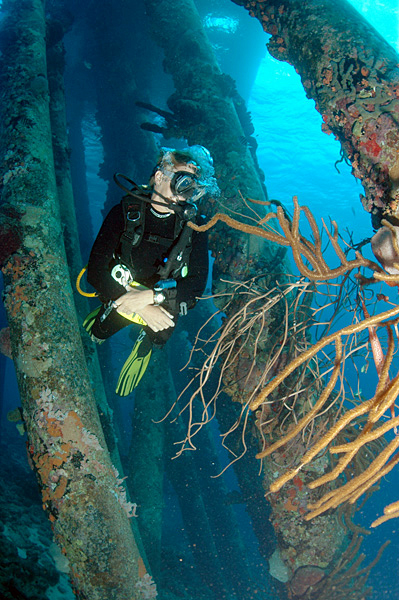
Diver under the Salt Pier in Bonaire

To dive safely, divers must control their rate of descent and ascent in the water and be able to maintain a constant depth in midwater. Ignoring other forces such as water currents and swimming, the diver's overall buoyancy determines whether they ascend or descend. Equipment such as diving weighting systems, diving suits, and buoyancy compensators(BC) can be used to adjust the overall buoyancy. When divers want to remain at constant depth, they try to achieve neutral buoyancy. This minimizes the effort of swimming to maintain depth and therefore reduces gas consumption.

A buoyancy compensator (BC), also called a buoyancy control device (BCD), is the equipment used by divers to establish neutral buoyancy underwater and positive buoyancy at the surface, when needed. The buoyancy is usually controlled by adjusting the volume of gas in an inflatable bladder, which is filled with ambient pressure gas from the diver's primary breathing gas cylinder via a low-pressure hose from the regulator first stage, directly from a small cylinder dedicated to this purpose, or from the diver's mouth through the oral inflation valve. Ambient pressure bladder buoyancy compensators can be broadly classified as having the buoyancy primarily in front, surrounding the torso, or behind the diver. This affects the ergonomics, and to a lesser degree, the safety of the unit.

The buoyancy force on the diver is the weight of the volume of the liquid that they and their equipment displace minus the weight of the diver and their equipment; if the result is positive, that force is upwards. The buoyancy of any object immersed in water is also affected by the density of the water. The density of fresh water is about 3% less than that of ocean water. Therefore, divers who are neutrally buoyant at one dive destination will predictably be positively or negatively buoyant when using the same equipment at destinations with different water densities. The removal ("ditching" or "shedding") of diver weighting systems can be used to reduce the diver's weight and cause a buoyant ascent in an emergency.

Diving suits made of compressible materials decrease in volume as the diver descends, and expand again as the diver ascends, causing buoyancy changes. Diving in different environments also necessitates adjustments in the amount of weight carried to achieve neutral buoyancy. The diver can inject air into a dry suit to counteract the compression effect and squeeze, but dry suits are not suitable for general buoyancy compensation. Buoyancy compensators allow easy and fine adjustments in the diver's overall volume and therefore buoyancy. Neutral buoyancy in a diver is an unstable state. It is changed by small differences in ambient pressure caused by a change in depth, and the change has a positive feedback effect. A small descent will increase the pressure, which will compress the gas-filled spaces and reduce the total volume of diver and equipment. This will further reduce the buoyancy, and unless counteracted, will result in sinking more rapidly. The equivalent effect applies to a small ascent, which will trigger an increased buoyancy and will result in an accelerated ascent unless counteracted. The diver must continuously adjust buoyancy or depth to remain neutral. Fine control of buoyancy can be achieved by controlling the average lung volume in open-circuit scuba, but this feature is not available to the closed circuit rebreather diver, as exhaled gas remains in the breathing loop. This is a skill that improves with practise until it becomes second nature.

=== Diver trim ===
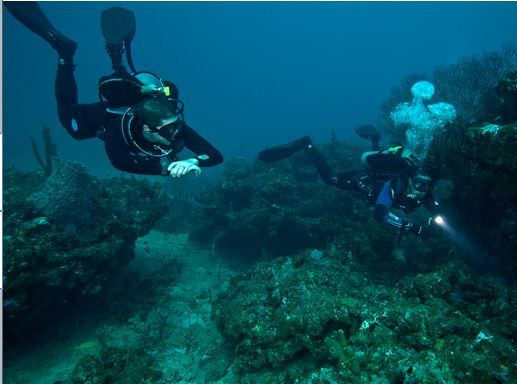
Divers with neutral buoyancy and horizontal trim with the fins raised are less likely to touch or disturb the bottom

The trim of a diver is the orientation of the body in the water, determined by posture and the distribution of weight and volume along the body and equipment, as well as by any other forces acting on the diver. Both static trim and its stability affect the convenience and safety of the diver while under water and at the surface. Midwater trim is usually considered at approximately neutral buoyancy for a swimming scuba diver, but surface trim may be at significant positive buoyancy to keep the head above water. Trim can significantly affect drag of a diver. The effect of swimming with a head up angle of about 15°, as is quite common in poorly trimmed divers, can be an increase in drag in the order of 50%.

=== Underwater vision ===
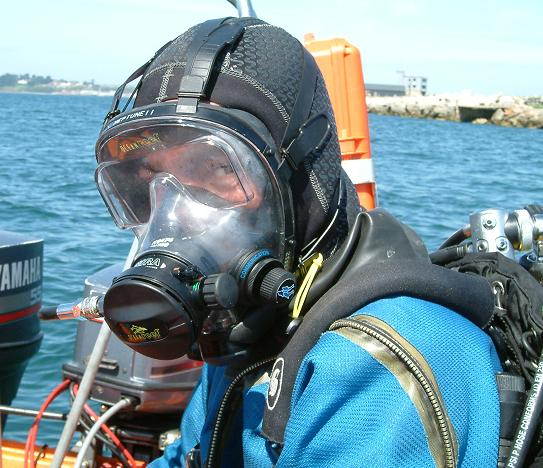
A diver wearing an Ocean Reef full face mask

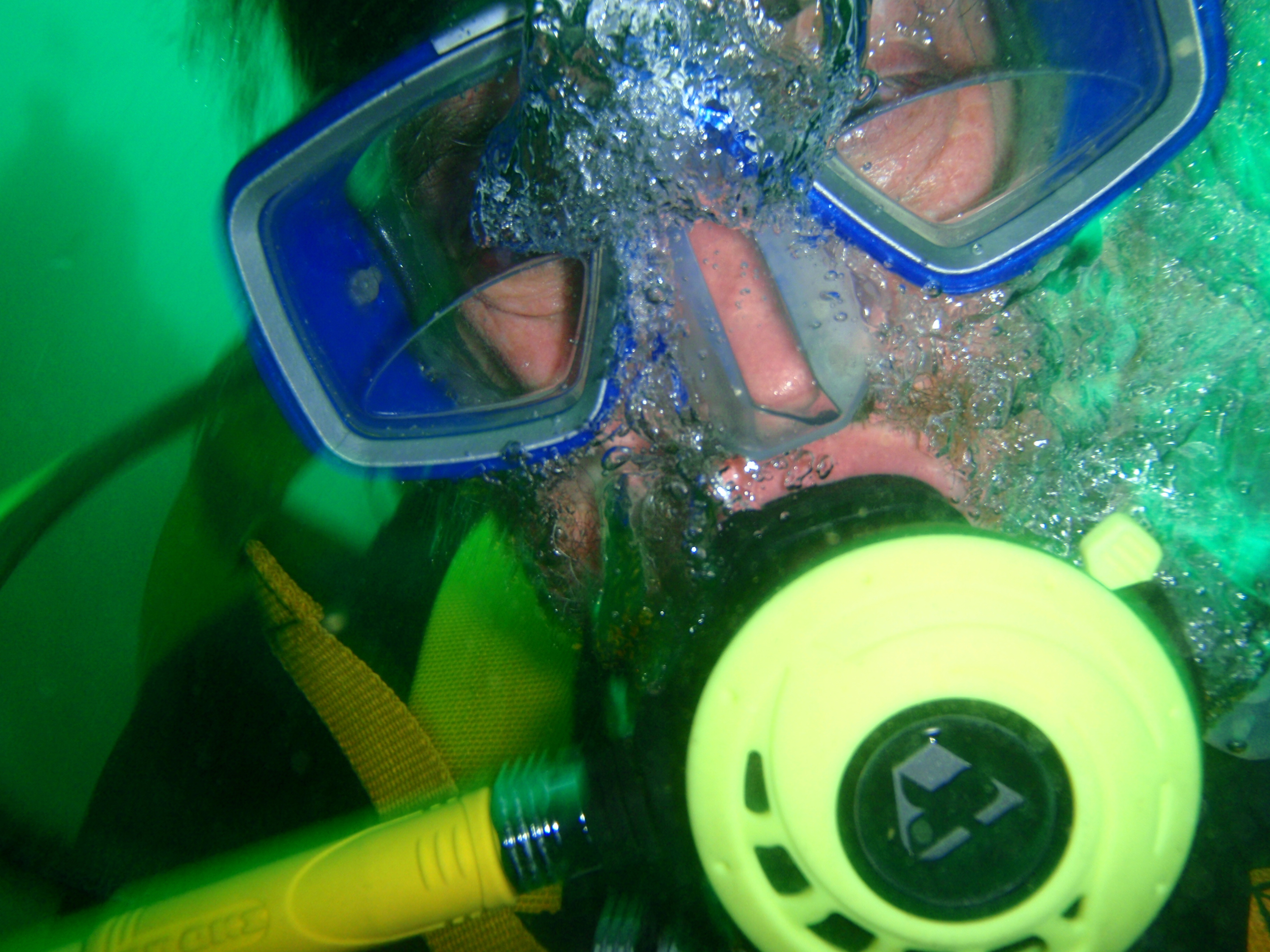
Scuba diver with bifocal lenses fitted to a mask

Water has a higher refractive index than air – similar to that of the cornea of the eye. Light entering the cornea from water is hardly refracted at all, leaving only the eye's crystalline lens to focus light. This leads to very severe hypermetropia. People with severe myopia, therefore, can see better underwater without a mask than normal-sighted people. Diving masks and helmets solve this problem by providing an air space in front of the diver's eyes. The refraction error created by the water is mostly corrected as the light travels from water to air through a flat lens, except that objects appear approximately 34% bigger and 25% closer in water than they actually are. The faceplate of the mask is supported by a frame and skirt, which are opaque or translucent, therefore the total field-of-view is significantly reduced and eye-hand coordination must be adjusted.

Divers who need corrective lenses to see clearly outside the water would normally need the same prescription while wearing a mask. Generic corrective lenses are available off the shelf for some two-window masks, and custom lenses can be bonded onto masks that have a single front window or two windows.

As a diver descends, they must periodically exhale through their nose to equalize the internal pressure of the mask with that of the surrounding water. Swimming goggles are not suitable for diving because they only cover the eyes and thus do not allow for equalization. Failure to equalize the pressure inside the mask may lead to a form of barotrauma known as mask squeeze. Masks tend to fog when warm humid exhaled air condenses on the cold inside of the faceplate. To prevent fogging many divers spit into the dry mask before use, spread the saliva over the inside of the glass and rinse it out with a little water. The saliva residue allows condensation to wet the glass and form a continuous wet film, rather than tiny droplets. There are several commercial products that can be used as an alternative to saliva, some of which are more effective and last longer, but there is a risk of getting the anti-fog agent in the eyes.

==== Dive lights ====
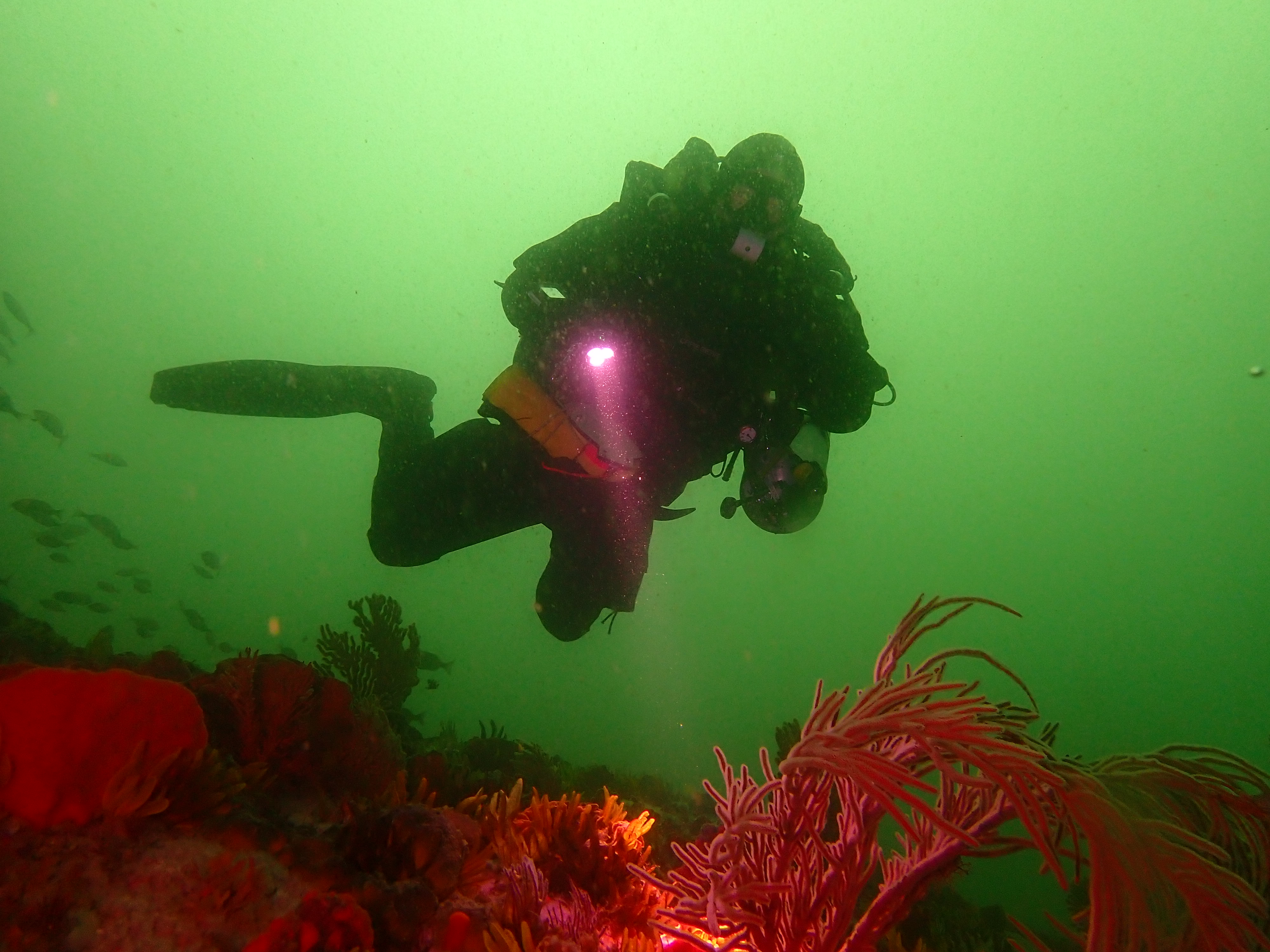
Scuba diver observing the reef illuminated by a hand held light

Water attenuates light by selective absorption. Pure water preferentially absorbs red light, and to a lesser extent, yellow and green, so the colour that is least absorbed is blue light. Dissolved materials may also selectively absorb colour in addition to the absorption by the water itself. In other words, as a diver goes deeper on a dive, more colour is absorbed by the water, and in clean water the colour becomes blue with depth. Colour vision is also affected by the turbidity of the water which tends to reduce contrast. Artificial light is useful to provide light in the darkness, to restore contrast at close range, and to restore natural colour lost to absorption. Dive lights can also attract fish and a variety of other sea creatures.

=== Exposure protection ===
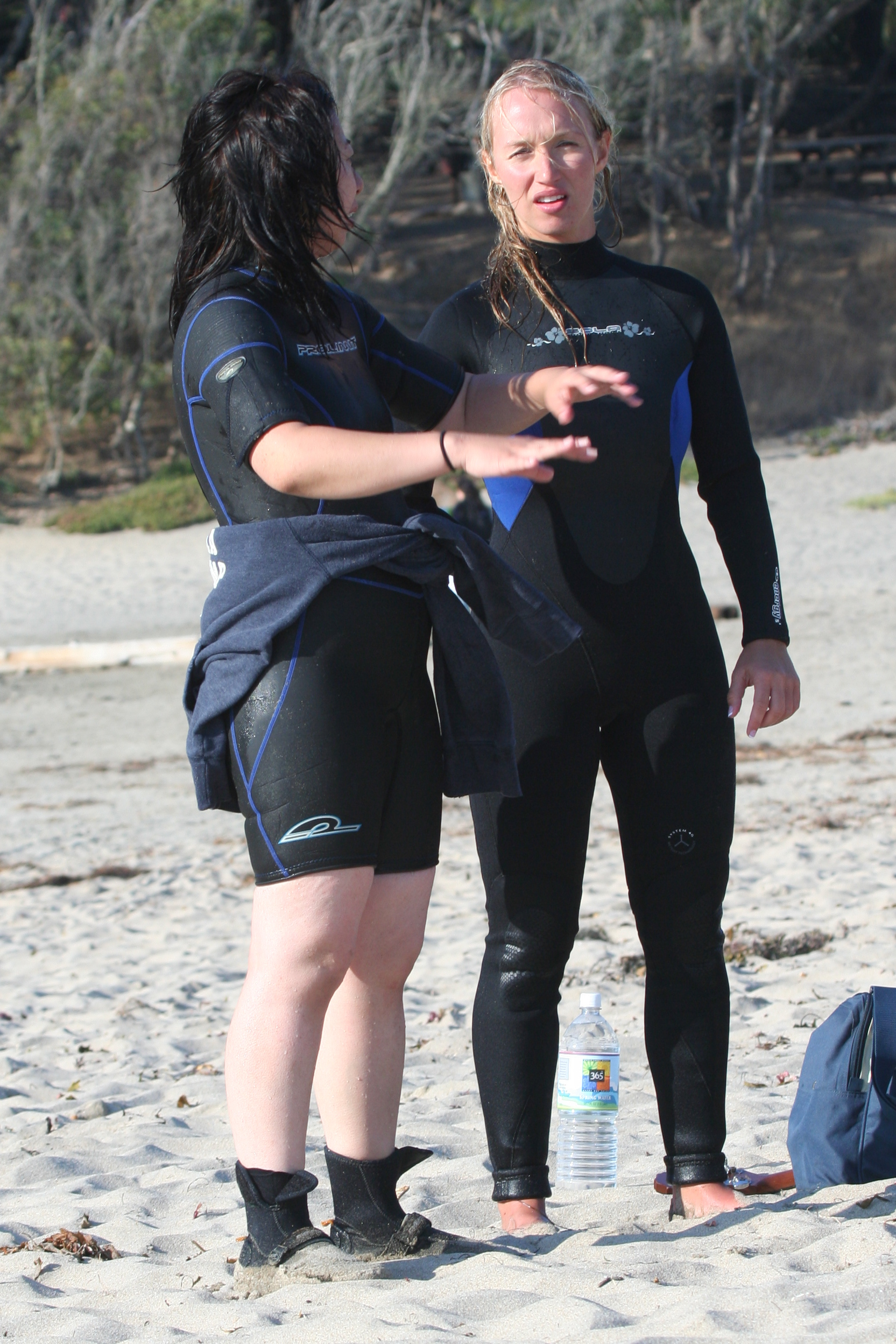
Two styles of wetsuits

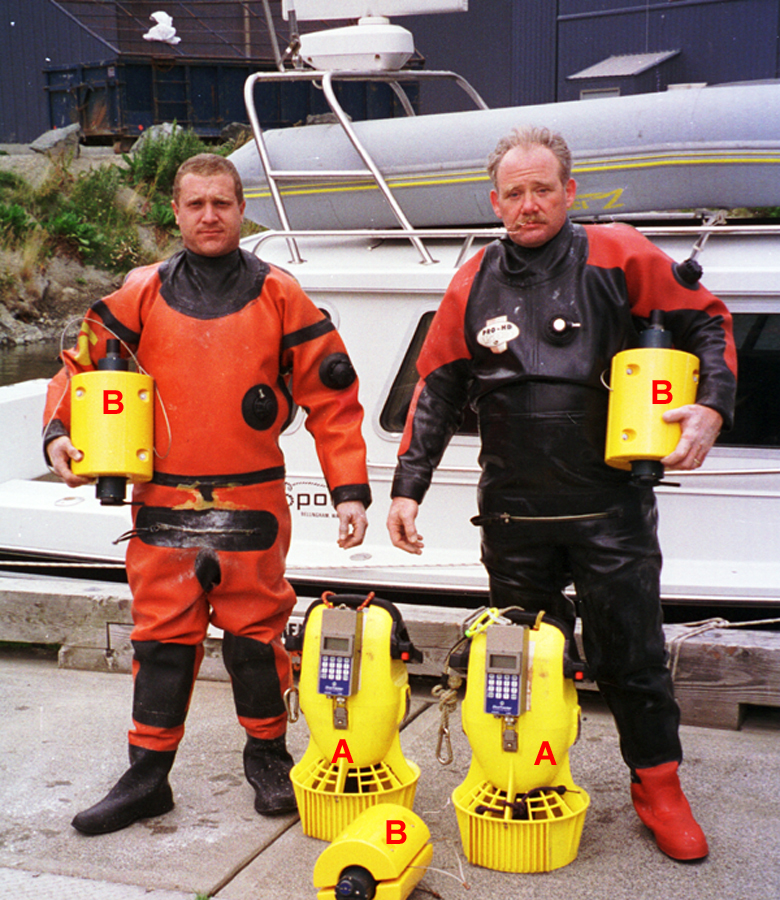
Scientific divers wearing dry suits

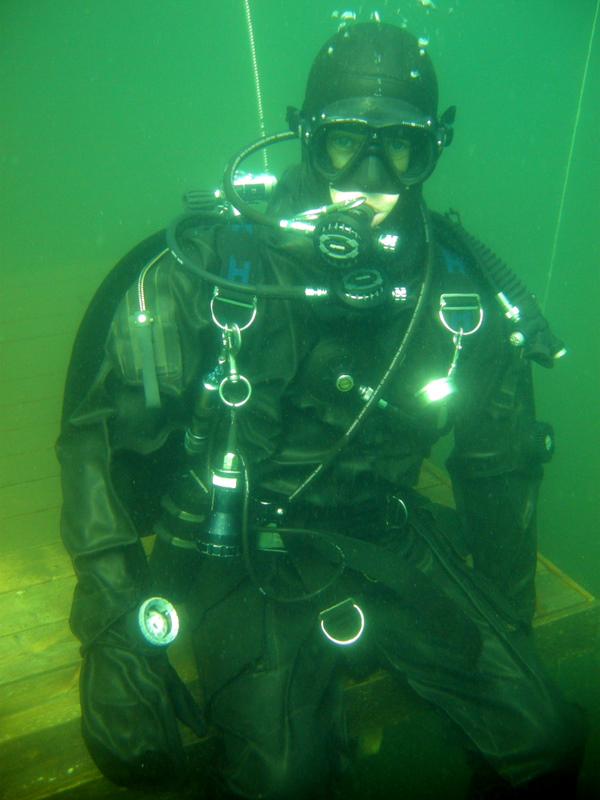
Diver wearing a dry suit in a lake in Finland where the water is cold

Protection from heat loss in cold water is usually provided by wetsuits or dry suits. These also provide protection from sunburn, abrasion and stings from some marine organisms. Where thermal insulation is not important, lycra suits or diving skins may be sufficient.

A wetsuit is a garment, usually made of foamed neoprene, which provides thermal insulation, abrasion resistance and buoyancy. The insulation properties depend on bubbles of gas enclosed within the material, which reduce its ability to conduct heat. The bubbles also give the wetsuit a low density, providing buoyancy in water. Suits range from a thin (2 mm or less) "shortie", covering just the torso, to a full 8 mm semi-dry, usually complemented by neoprene boots, gloves and hood. A good close fit and few zips help the suit to remain waterproof and reduce flushing – the replacement of water trapped between suit and body by cold water from the outside. Improved seals at the neck, wrists and ankles and baffles under zips produce a suit known as "semi-dry".

A dry suit also provides thermal insulation to the wearer while immersed in water, and generally protects the entire body except the head, hands, and sometimes the feet. In some configurations, these are also covered. Dry suits are usually used where the water temperature is below 15 °C (60 °F) or for extended immersion in water above 15 °C (60 °F), where a wetsuit user would get cold, and with an integral helmet, boots, and gloves for personal protection when diving in contaminated water. Dry suits are designed to prevent water from entering. This generally allows better insulation making them more suitable for use in cold water. They can be uncomfortably hot in warm or hot air, and are typically more expensive and more complex to don. They add some task loading for the diver as the suit must be inflated and deflated with changes in depth in order to avoid "squeeze" on descent or uncontrolled rapid ascent due to over-buoyancy. Divers may also use the gas argon to inflate their dry suits because it has a low thermal conductivity.

=== Monitoring and navigation ===
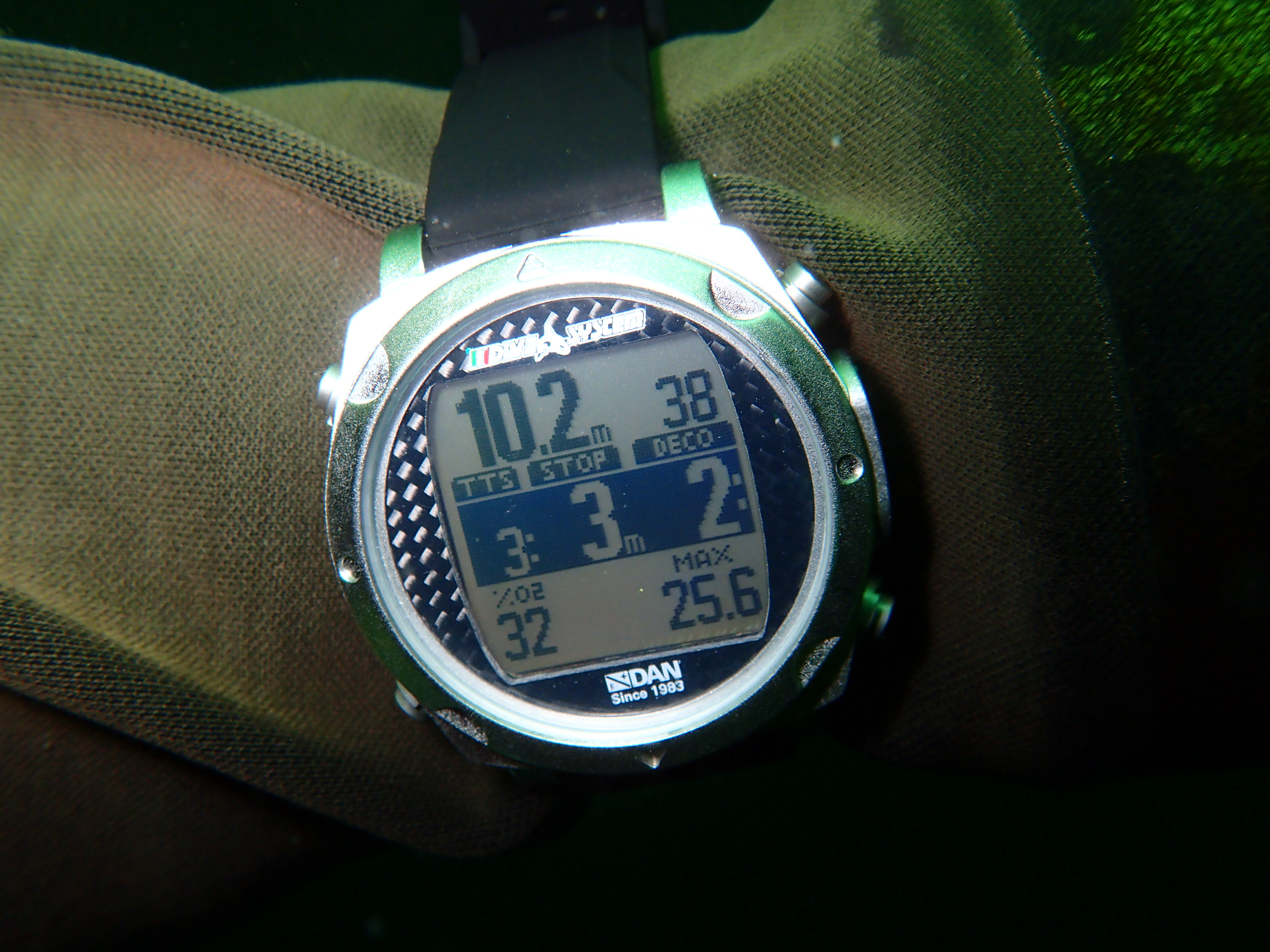
Wristwatch style dive computer showing a short decompression requirement

Unless the maximum depth of the water is known, and is quite shallow, a diver must monitor the depth and duration of a dive to avoid decompression sickness. Traditionally this was done by using a depth gauge and a diving watch, but electronic dive computers are now in general use, as they are programmed to do real-time modelling of decompression requirements for the dive, and automatically allow for surface interval. Many can be set for the gas mixture to be used on the dive, and some can accept changes in the gas mix during the dive. Most dive computers provide a fairly conservative decompression model, and the level of conservatism may be selected by the user within limits. Most decompression computers can also be set for altitude compensation to some degree, and some will automatically take altitude into account by measuring actual atmospheric pressure and using it in the calculations.

If the dive site and dive plan require the diver to navigate, a compass may be carried, and where retracing a route is critical, as in cave or wreck penetrations, a guide line is laid from a dive reel. In less critical conditions, many divers simply navigate by landmarks and memory, a procedure also known as pilotage or natural navigation. A scuba diver should always be aware of the remaining breathing gas supply, and the duration of diving time that this will safely support, taking into account the time required to surface safely and an allowance for foreseeable contingencies. This is usually monitored by using a submersible pressure gauge on each cylinder. Some dive computers have a facility known as gas integration for remote monitoring of the pressure in one or more cylinders via signals from a wireless pressure transmitter mounted to the regulator first stage.

=== Safety equipment ===
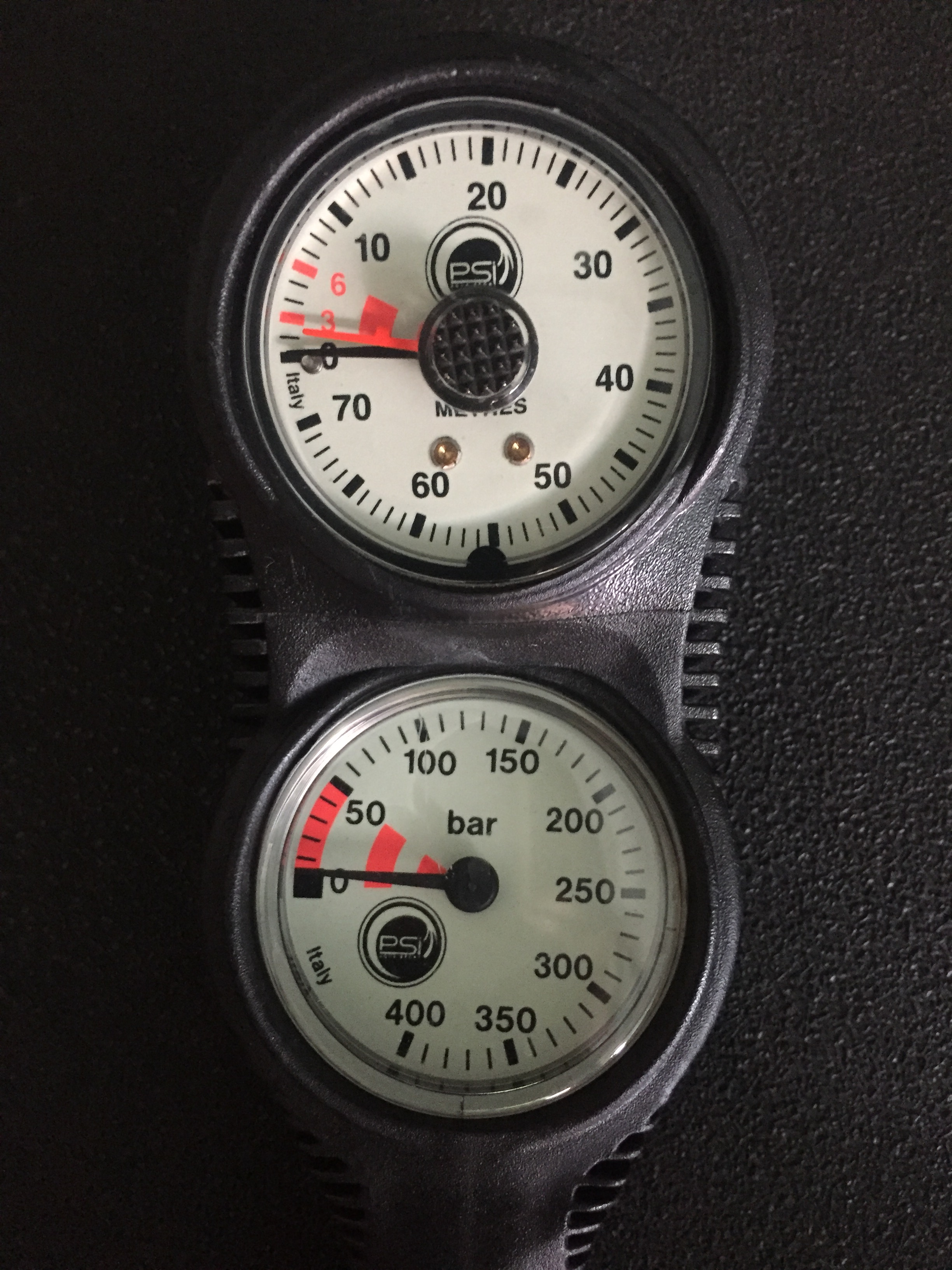
A depth gauge in a console mounted on the submersible pressure gauge

Any scuba diver who will be diving below a depth from which they are competent to do a safe emergency swimming ascent in all reasonably foreseeable circumstances should ensure that they have an alternative breathing gas supply available at all times in case of a failure of the equipment they are breathing from at the time. Several systems are in common use depending on the planned dive profile. Most common, but least reliable, is relying on the dive buddy for gas sharing using a secondary second stage, commonly called an octopus regulator connected to the primary first stage. This system relies entirely on the dive buddy being immediately available and competent to provide emergency gas. More reliable systems require the diver to carry an alternative gas supply sufficient to allow the diver to safely reach a place where more breathing gas is available. For open water recreational divers this is the surface, for technical divers on a penetration dive, it may be a stage cylinder positioned at a point on the exit path, and for divers with a decompression obligation, it may be a depth at which decompression gas is acceptably safe to breathe. An emergency gas supply must be sufficiently safe to breathe at any point on the planned dive profile at which it may be needed. This equipment may be a bailout cylinder, a bailout rebreather, a travel gas cylinder, or a decompression gas cylinder. A bailout cylinder provides emergency breathing gas sufficient for a safe emergency ascent. When using a travel gas or decompression gas, the back gas (main gas supply) may be the designated emergency gas supply.

Cutting tools such as knives, line cutters or shears are often carried by divers to cut loose from entanglement in nets or lines. A surface marker buoy (SMB) on a line held by the diver indicates the position of the diver to the surface personnel. This may be an inflatable marker deployed by the diver at the end of the dive, or a sealed buoyant float, towed for the whole dive. A surface marker also allows easy and accurate control of ascent rate and stop depth for safer decompression.

Various surface detection aids may be carried to help surface personnel spot the diver after ascent. In addition to the surface marker buoy, divers may carry mirrors, lights, strobes, whistles, flares or emergency locator beacons.

=== Accessories and tools ===
Divers may carry underwater photographic or video equipment, or tools for a specific application in addition to diving equipment. Professional divers will routinely carry and use tools to facilitate their underwater work, while most recreational divers will not engage in underwater work.

== Breathing from scuba ==
Animation of demand valve function during the breathing cycle. A cracking pressure adjustment knob can be seen at the left side of the valve mechanism. Screwing it in increases the pre-load on the valve spring and increases the pressure difference required to pull the diaphragm in enough to open the valve.

Graph of the breathing resistance of an open-circuit demand regulator. The area of the graph (green) is proportional to the net mechanical work of breathing for a single breathing cycle.

Breathing from scuba is mostly a straightforward matter. Under most circumstances, it differs very little from normal surface breathing. In the case of a full-face mask, the diver may usually breathe through the nose or mouth as preferred, and in the case of a mouth held demand valve, the diver will have to hold the mouthpiece between the teeth and maintain a seal around it with the lips. Over a long dive this can induce jaw fatigue, and for some people, a gag reflex. Various styles of mouthpiece are available off the shelf or as customised items, and one of them may work better if either of these problems occur. Mouthpiece retaining straps are available but not generally used.

The frequently quoted warning against holding one's breath on scuba is a gross oversimplification of the actual hazard. The purpose of the admonition is to ensure that inexperienced divers do not accidentally hold their breath while surfacing, as the expansion of gas in the lungs could over-expand the lung air spaces and rupture the alveoli and their capillaries, allowing lung gases to get into the pulmonary return circulation, the pleura, or the interstitial areas near the injury, where it could cause dangerous medical conditions. Holding the breath at constant depth for short periods with a normal lung volume is generally harmless, providing there is sufficient ventilation on average to prevent carbon dioxide buildup, and is done as a standard practice by underwater photographers to avoid startling their subjects. Holding the breath during descent can eventually cause lung squeeze, and may allow the diver to miss warning signs of a gas supply malfunction until it is too late to remedy.

A breathing pattern of slow, deep breaths which limits gas velocity and thereby turbulent flow in the air passages will minimise the work of breathing for a given gas mixture composition and density, and respiratory minute volume. Skilled open-circuit divers make small adjustments to buoyancy by adjusting their average lung volume during the breathing cycle. This adjustment is generally in the order of a kilogram (corresponding to a litre of gas), and can be maintained for a moderate period, but it is more comfortable to adjust the volume of the buoyancy compensator over the longer term.

The practice of shallow breathing or skip breathing in an attempt to conserve breathing gas should be avoided as it is inefficient and tends to cause a carbon dioxide buildup, which can result in headaches and a reduced capacity to recover from a breathing gas supply emergency. The breathing apparatus will generally increase dead space by a small but significant amount, and cracking pressure and flow resistance in the demand valve will cause a net work of breathing increase, which will reduce the diver's capacity for other work. Work of breathing and the effect of dead space can be minimised by breathing relatively deeply and slowly. These effects increase with depth, as density and friction increase in proportion to the increase in pressure, with the limiting case where all the diver's available energy may be expended on simply breathing, with none left for other purposes. This would be followed by a buildup in carbon dioxide, causing an urgent feeling of a need to breathe, and if this cycle is not broken, panic and drowning are likely to follow. The use of a low-density diluent gas, typically helium, in the breathing mixture can reduce this problem, as well as diluting the narcotic effects of the other gases.

Breathing from a rebreather is much the same, except that the work of breathing is affected largely by flow resistance in the breathing loop. This is partly due to the carbon dioxide absorbent in the scrubber, and is related to the distance the gas passes through the absorbent material, and the size of the gaps between the grains, as well as the gas composition and ambient pressure. Water in the loop can greatly increase the resistance to gas flow through the scrubber. There is even less point in shallow or skip breathing on a rebreather as this does not even conserve gas, and the effect on buoyancy is negligible when the sum of loop volume and lung volume remains constant.

== Procedures ==
The underwater environment is unfamiliar and hazardous, and to ensure diver safety, simple, yet necessary procedures must be followed. A certain minimum level of attention to detail and acceptance of responsibility for one's own safety and survival are required, even at entry level. Most of the procedures are simple and straightforward, and become second nature to the experienced diver, but must be learned, and take some practice to become automatic and faultless, just like the ability to walk or talk. Most of the safety procedures are intended to reduce the risk of drowning, and many of the rest are to reduce the risk of barotrauma and decompression sickness. In some environments getting lost is a serious hazard, and specific procedures to minimise the risk are followed.

=== Preparation for the dive ===
The purpose of dive planning is to ensure that divers do not exceed their comfort zone or skill level, or the safe capacity of their equipment, are likely to accomplish the goal of the dive, and includes gas planning to ensure that the amount of breathing gas to be carried is sufficient to allow for any reasonably foreseeable contingencies. Before starting a dive both the diver and their buddy (Note: A diving buddy is the other member of a two diver team.) or the dive team, do equipment checks to ensure everything is in good working order, ready for use, and correctly fitted. Recreational divers are responsible for planning their own dives, unless in training, when the instructor is responsible. Divemasters may provide useful information and suggestions to assist the divers, but are generally not responsible for the details unless specifically employed to do so. In professional diving teams, all team members are usually expected to contribute to planning and to check the equipment they will use, but the overall responsibility for the safety of the team lies with the supervisor as the appointed on-site representative of the employer.

=== Standard diving procedures ===
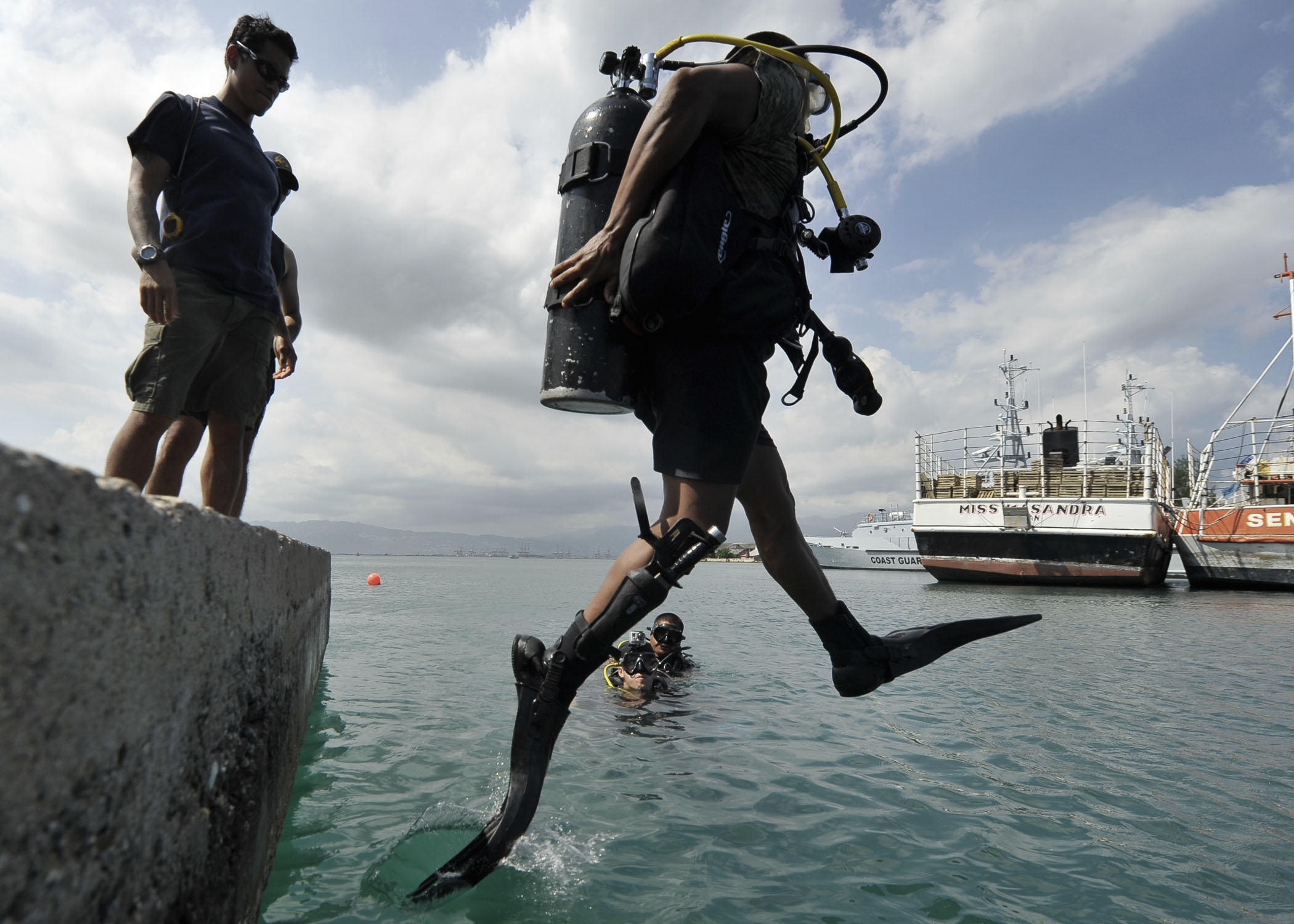
Stride entry or front step entry from a low dockside

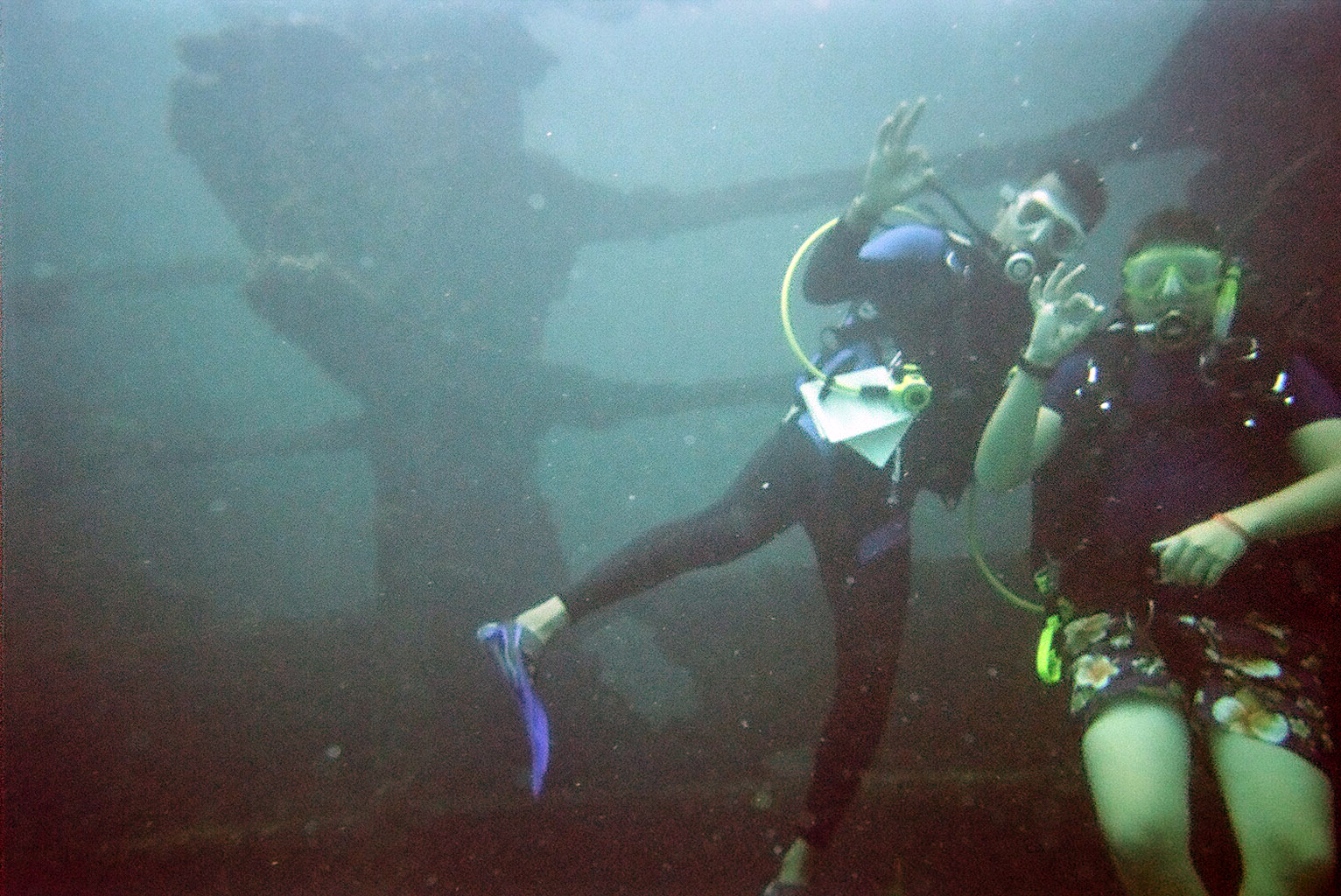
Two divers giving the gesture that they are "OK"

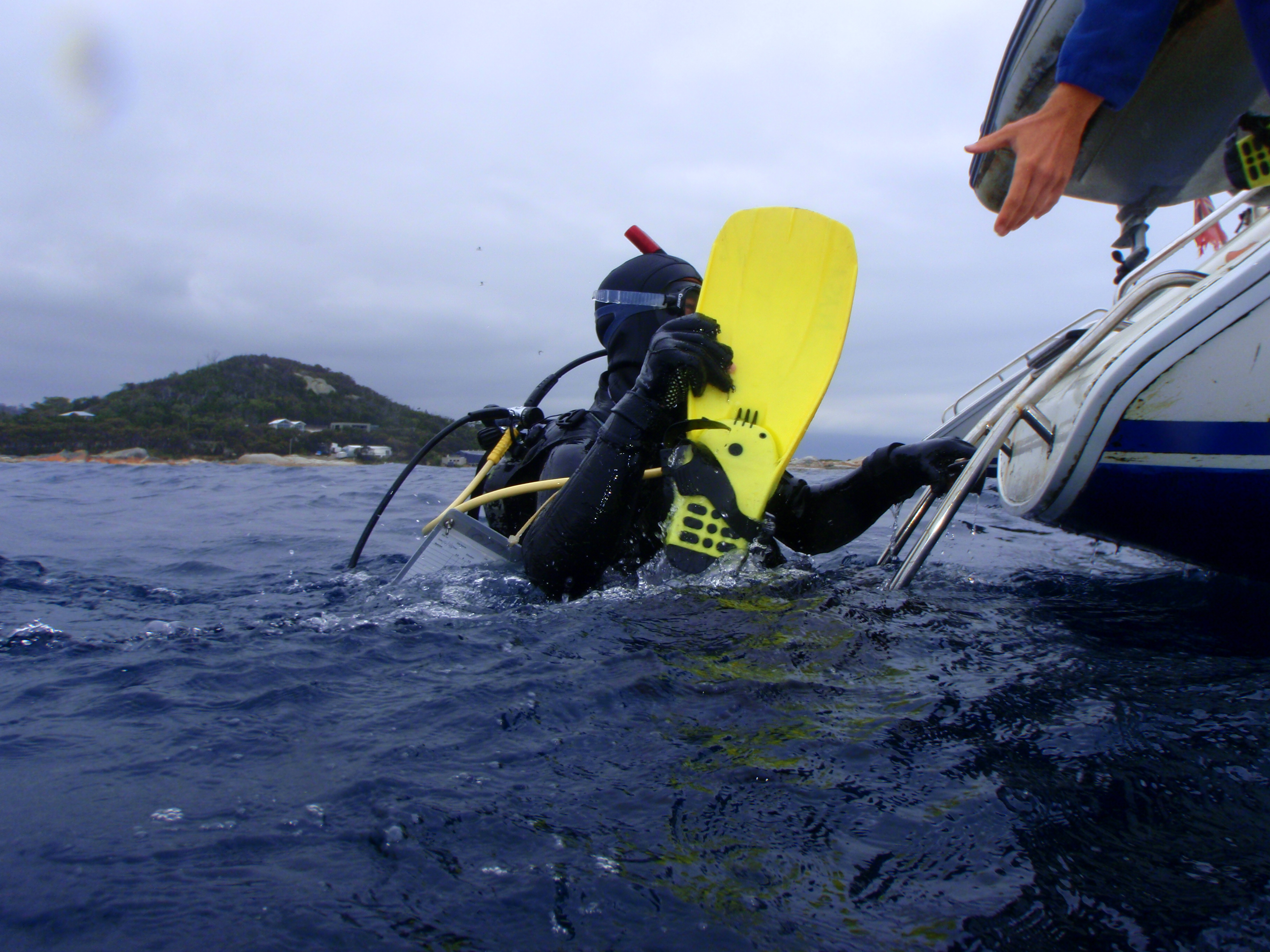
Scuba diver exiting water by stern platform ladder on a sailing catamaran

Some procedures are common to almost all scuba dives, or are used to manage very common contingencies. These are learned at entry level and may be highly standardised to allow efficient cooperation between divers trained at different schools.

- Water entry procedures are intended to allow the diver to enter the water without injury, loss of equipment, or damage to equipment.
- Descent procedures cover how to descend at the right place, time, and rate; with the correct breathing gas available; and without losing contact with the other divers in the group.
- Equalisation of pressure in gas spaces is necessary to avoid barotraumas. The expansion or compression of enclosed gas spaces may cause discomfort or injury while diving. Critically, the lungs are susceptible to over-expansion and subsequent rupture if a diver holds their breath while ascending: during training divers are taught not to hold their breath while diving. Ear clearing is another critical equalisation procedure, usually requiring conscious intervention by the diver.
- Mask and regulator clearing may be needed to ensure the ability to see and breathe in case of flooding. This can easily happen, and while immediate correct response is necessary, the procedure is simple and routine and occasional incidental flooding is not considered an emergency.
- Buoyancy control generally requires frequent adjustment (particularly during depth changes) to ensure safe, effective, and convenient underwater mobility during the dive. This depends on the equipment in use and dive profile. Depth control during ascent is facilitated by ascending on a line with a buoy at the top. The diver can remain marginally negative and easily maintain depth by holding onto the line. A shotline or decompression buoy are commonly used for this purpose. Precise and reliable depth control is particularly valuable when the diver has a large decompression obligation, as it allows the theoretically most efficient decompression at the lowest reasonably practicable risk.
- Diver trim is largely dependent on equipment setup and weight and buoyancy distribution. Some configurations are inherently easier to trim then others, and an unstable setup will require constant effort to maintain desired trim. Trim may also be affected by weight shift due to gas consumption.
- Mobility – Most scuba diving propulsion and maneuvering is done by finning techniques, allowing the hands to be used for other purposes, but where long distances must be covered, diver propulsion vehicles can greatly increase horizontal range for the sane gas consumption.
- Buddy checks, breathing gas monitoring, and decompression status monitoring are carried out to ensure that the dive plan is followed and that members of the group are safe and available to help each other in an emergency.
- Monitoring the progress and status of the dive. To follow a plan the plan must be known, acceptable variations must be known, and the dive must be monitored sufficiently to be aware when acceptable variations will be exceeded, so that corrective action can be taken in time, or the dive can be safely terminated, or appropriate emergency actions taken. In most scuba diving, this is the equal responsibility of each diver, though a dive leader or instructor may have an additional responsibility to ensure that the divers are fulfilling their obligations, and where they have expert or local knowledge of the situation.
- Underwater communication: Divers cannot talk underwater unless they are wearing a full-face mask and electronic communications equipment, but they can communicate basic and emergency information using standard hand signals, light signals, and rope signals, and more complex messages can be written on waterproof slates.
- Ascent, decompression, and surfacing procedures are intended to ensure that dissolved inert gases are safely released, that barotraumas of ascent are avoided, and that it is safe to surface.
- Water exit procedures are intended to let the diver leave the water without injury, loss of, or damage to equipment.

=== Decompression ===
Inert gas components of the diver's breathing gas accumulate in the tissues during exposure to elevated pressure during a dive, and must be eliminated during the ascent to avoid the formation of symptomatic bubbles in tissues where the concentration is too high for the gas to remain in solution, called decompression sickness, also known as "the bends", and which can include symptoms such as itching, rash, joint pain, nausea and paralysis. The process of gas elimination is called decompression, and occurs on all scuba dives. Most recreational and professional scuba divers avoid obligatory decompression stops by following a dive profile which only requires a limited rate of ascent for decompression, but will commonly also do an optional short, shallow, decompression stop known as a safety stop to further reduce risk before surfacing. In some cases, particularly in technical diving, more complex decompression procedures are necessary. Decompression may follow a pre-planned series of ascents interrupted by stops at specific depths, or may be monitored by a personal decompression computer.

=== Post-dive procedures ===
These include debriefing where appropriate, and equipment maintenance, to ensure that the equipment is kept in good condition for later use. It is also considered a best practice to log each dive upon completion. This is done for several reasons: If a diver is planning on doing multiple dives in a day, they need to know what the depth and duration of previous dives were in order to calculate residual inert gas levels in preparation for the next dive. (Note: This function is performed by the dive computer if one is used.) It is helpful to note what equipment was used for each dive and what the conditions were like for reference when planning another similar dive. For example, the thickness and type of wetsuit used during a dive, and if it was in fresh or salt water, will influence the amount of weight needed. Knowing this information and taking note of whether the weight used was too heavy or too light can help when planning another dive in similar conditions. In order to achieve a level of certification the diver may be required to present evidence of a specified number of logged and verified dives. Professional divers may be legally required to log specific information for every working dive. When a personal dive computer is used, it will accurately record the details of the dive profile, and this data can usually be downloaded to an electronic logbook, in which the diver can add the other details manually.

=== Buddy, team or solo diving ===
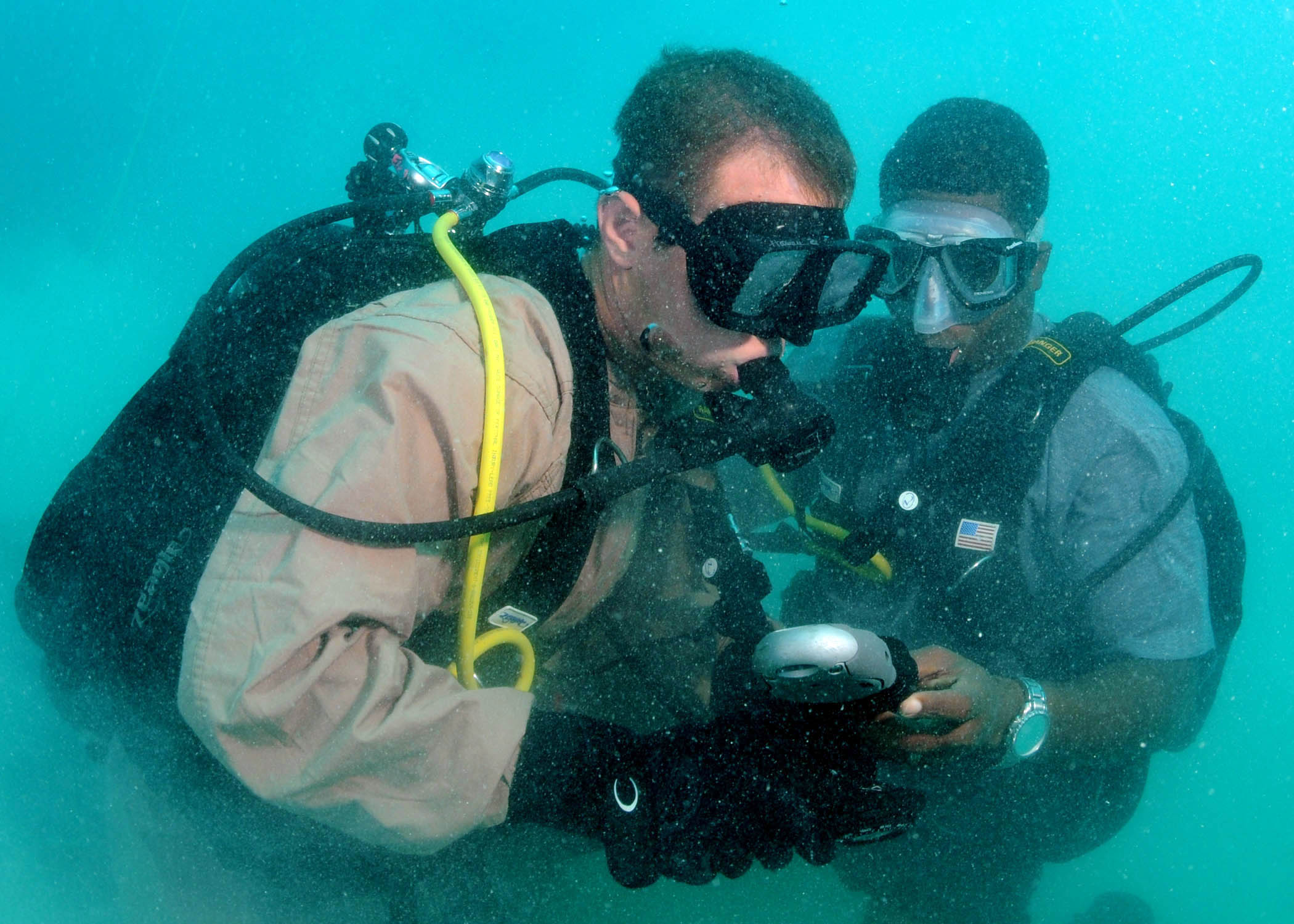
A Navy buddy diver team checking their gauges together

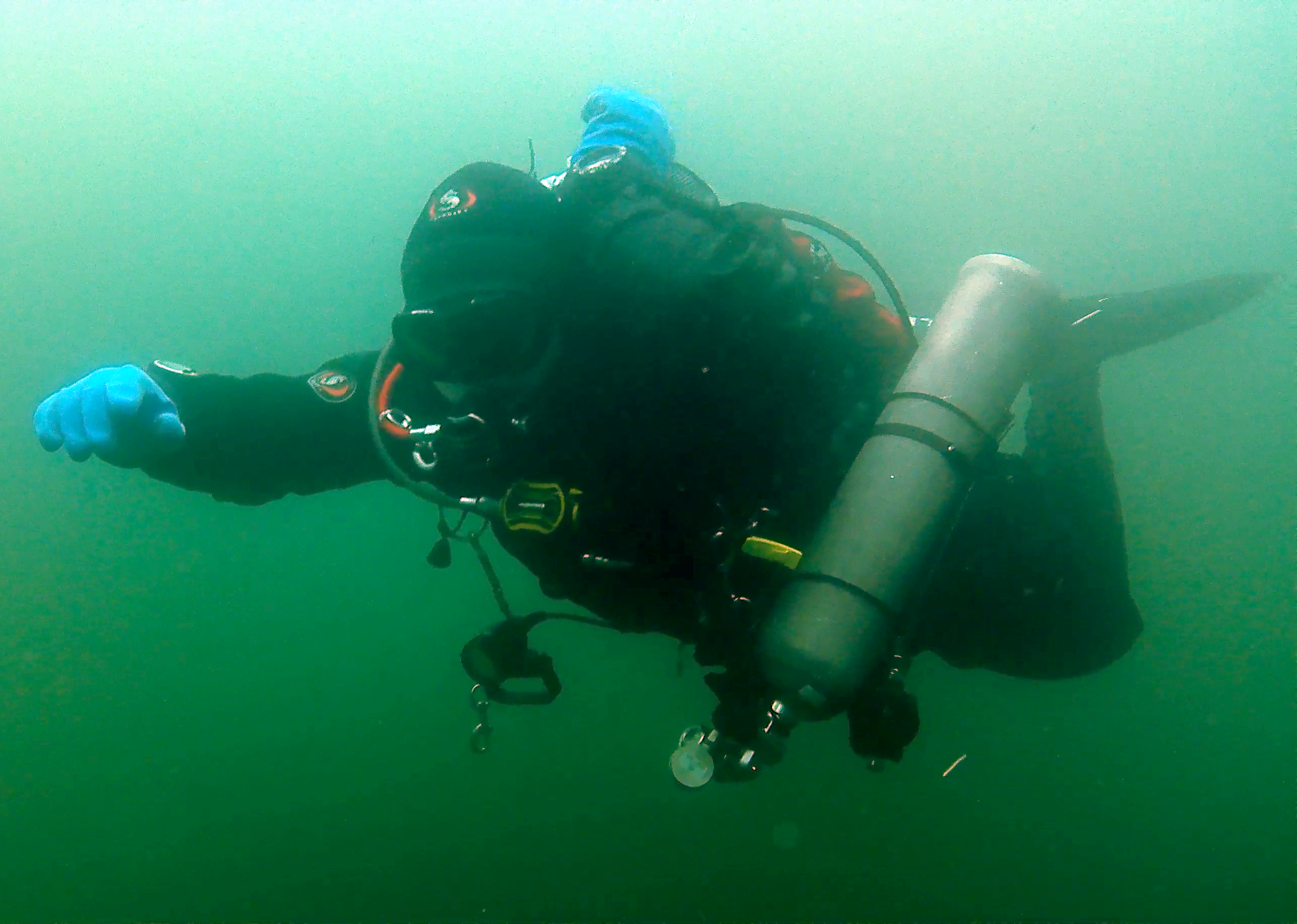
Solo diver with sling-mounted bail out cylinder

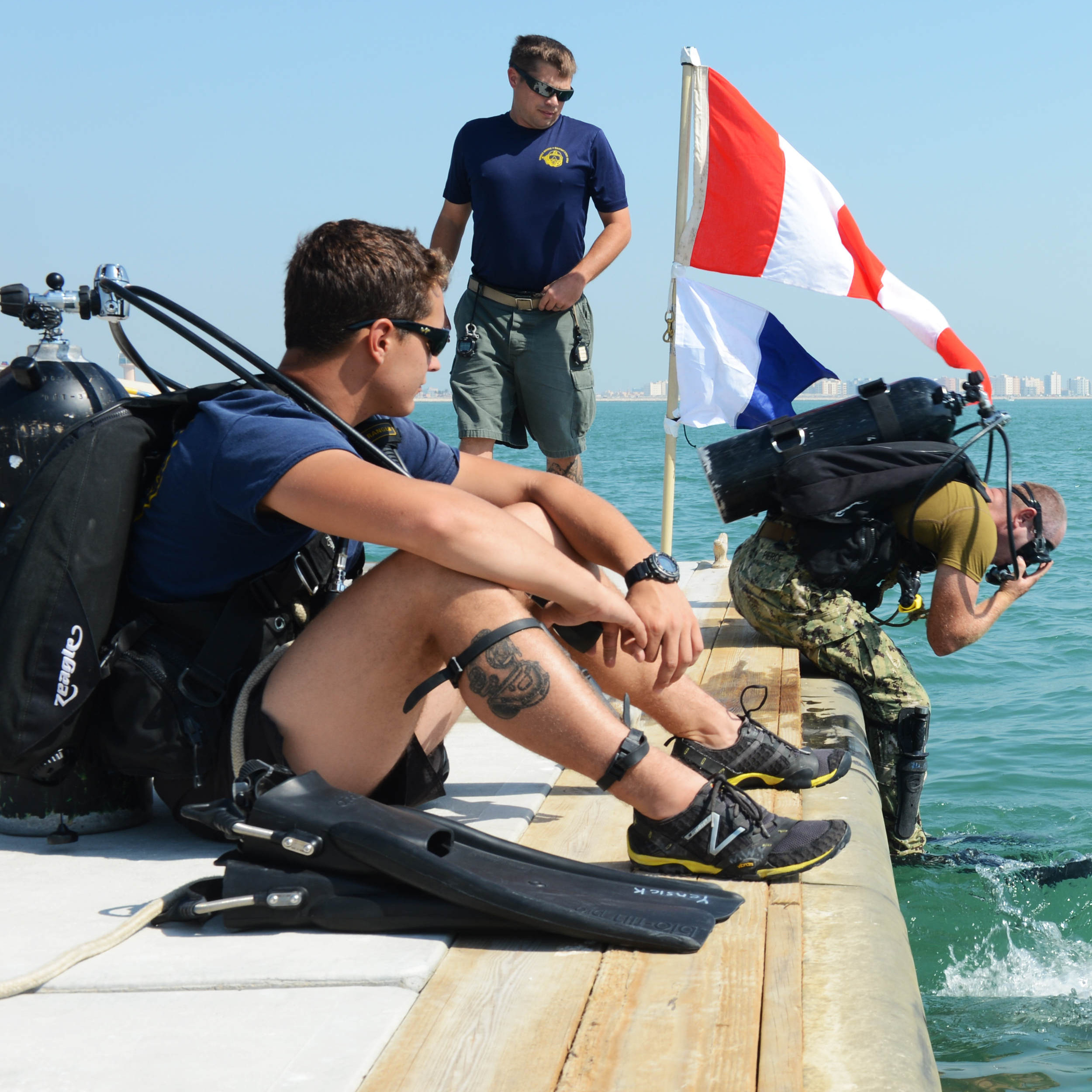
Minimal professional diving team, with standby diver, supervisor and working diver entering the water

Buddy and team diving procedures are intended to ensure that a recreational scuba diver who gets into difficulty underwater is in the presence of a similarly equipped person who will understand the problem and can render assistance. Divers are trained to assist in those emergencies specified in the training standards for their certification, and are required to demonstrate competence in a set of prescribed buddy assistance skills. The fundamentals of buddy and team safety are focused on constant awareness of the location and status of the buddy, diver communication, sharing breathing gas with the buddy in an emergency, and the added situational perspective of another diver. There is general consensus that the presence of a buddy both willing and competent to assist can reduce the risk of certain classes of accidents, but much less agreement on how often this happens in practice.

Solo divers take responsibility for their own safety and compensate for the absence of a buddy with skill, vigilance and appropriate equipment. Like buddy or team divers, properly equipped solo divers rely on the redundancy of critical articles of dive gear which may include at least two independent supplies of breathing gas and ensuring that there is always enough available to safely terminate the dive if any one supply fails. The difference between the two practices is that this redundancy is carried and managed by the solo diver instead of a buddy. Agencies that certify for solo diving require candidates to have a relatively high level of dive experience – usually about 100 dives or more.

Since the inception of scuba, there has been an ongoing debate regarding the wisdom of solo diving with strong opinions on both sides of the issue. This debate is complicated by the fact that the line which separates a solo diver from a buddy/team diver is not always clear. For example, should a scuba instructor (who supports the buddy system) be considered a solo diver if their students do not have the knowledge or experience to assist the instructor through an unforeseen scuba emergency during a training dive? Should the buddy of an underwater photographer consider themselves as effectively diving alone since their buddy (the photographer) is giving most or all of their attention to the subject of the photograph? This debate has motivated some prominent scuba agencies such as Global Underwater Explorers (GUE) to stress that its members only dive in teams and "remain aware of team member location and safety at all times". Other agencies have taken the position that divers might find themselves alone (by choice or by accident) and have created certification courses such as the "SDI Solo Diver" course and the "PADI Self-Reliant Diver" course in order to train divers to handle such possibilities.

=== Navigation ===
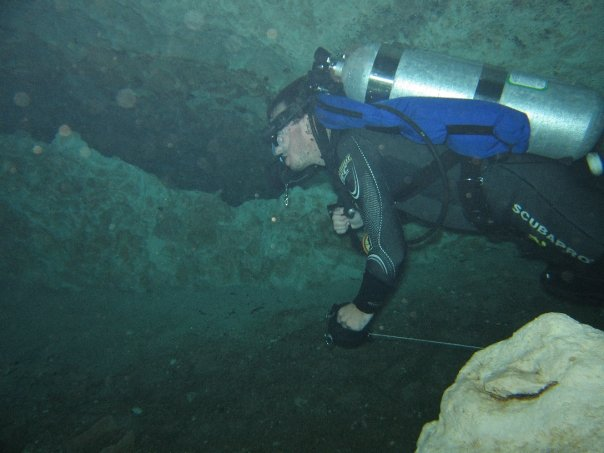
A cave diver running a reel with guide line into the overhead environment

Scuba divers, by definition, carry their breathing gas supply with them during the dive, and this limited quantity must get them back to the surface safely. Pre-dive planning of appropriate gas supply for the intended dive profile lets the diver allow for sufficient breathing gas for the planned dive and contingencies. They are not connected to a surface control point by an umbilical, such as surface-supplied divers use, and the freedom of movement that this allows, also allows the diver to penetrate overhead environments in ice diving, cave diving and wreck diving to the extent that the diver may lose their way and be unable to find the way out. This problem is exacerbated by the limited breathing gas supply, which gives a limited amount of time before the diver will drown if unable to surface. The standard procedure for managing this risk is to lay a continuous guideline from open water, which allows the diver to be sure of the route to the surface. In less hazardous environments, pilotage and compass navigation may be used.

=== Emergency procedures ===
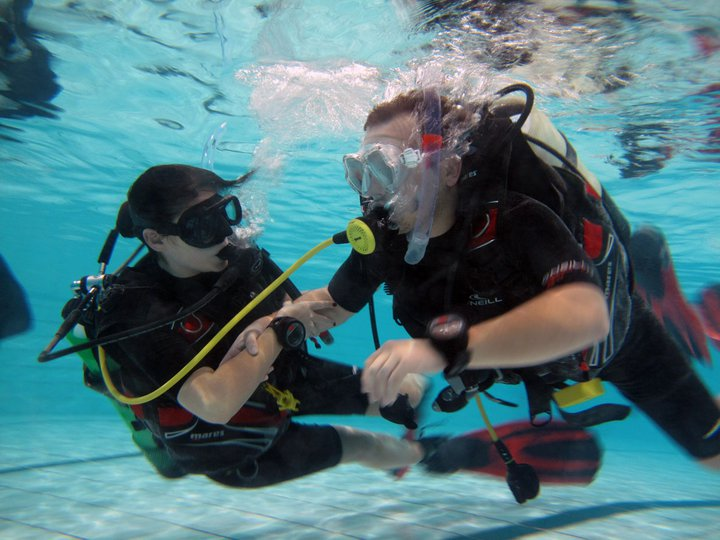
Scuba divers practicing emergency alternate air source use

The most urgent underwater emergencies usually involve a compromised breathing gas supply. Divers are trained in procedures for donating and receiving breathing gas from each other in an emergency, and may carry an independent alternative air source if they do not choose to rely on a buddy. Divers may need to make an emergency ascent in the event of a loss of breathing gas which cannot be managed at depth. Controlled emergency ascents are almost always a consequence of loss of breathing gas, while uncontrolled ascents are usually the result of a buoyancy control failure. Other urgent emergencies may involve loss of control of depth and medical emergencies.

Two basic types of entrapment are significant hazards for scuba divers: Inability to navigate out of an enclosed space, and physical entrapment which prevents the diver from leaving a location. The first case can usually be avoided by staying out of enclosed spaces, and when the objective of the dive includes penetration of enclosed spaces, taking precautions such as the use of lights and guidelines, for which specialised training is provided in the standard procedures, and emergency procedures for finding a lost or broken gudeline. The most common form of physical entrapment is getting snagged on ropes, lines or nets, and the use of a cutting implement is the standard method of dealing with the problem. The risk of entanglement can be reduced by careful configuration of equipment to minimise those parts which can easily be snagged, and allow easier disentanglement. Other forms of entrapment such as getting wedged into tight spaces can often be avoided, but must otherwise be dealt with as they happen. The assistance of a buddy may be helpful where possible.

Divers may be trained in procedures that have been approved by the training agencies for recovery of an unresponsive diver to the surface, where it might be possible to administer first aid. Not all recreational divers have this training as some agencies do not include it in entry-level training. Professional divers may be required by legislation or code of practice to have a standby diver at any diving operation, who is both competent and available to attempt rescue of a distressed diver.

== Range and endurance ==
Range and endurance in general are limited by the ability of the diver to manage a suitable breathing gas supply and to remain in an acceptable thermal balance. Depth is also limited by physiological factors.

=== Depth range ===
The depth range applicable to scuba diving depends on the application and training. Entry-level divers are expected to limit themselves to about 18 metres (60 ft) to 20 metres (66 ft). The major worldwide recreational diver certification agencies consider 40 metres (130 ft) to be the limit for recreational diving. British and European agencies, including BSAC and SAA, recommend a maximum depth of 50 metres (160 ft) Shallower limits are recommended for divers who are youthful, inexperienced, or who have not taken training for deep dives. Technical diving extends these depth limits through changes to training, equipment, and the gas mixes used. The maximum depth considered safe is controversial and varies among agencies and instructors, however, there is an international standard (ISO 24807) for technical rebreather training to 100 metres (330 ft), and programs that train divers for dives to 120 metres (390 ft).

Professional diving usually limits the allowed planned decompression depending on the code of practice, operational directives, or statutory restrictions. Depth limits depend on the jurisdiction, and maximum depths allowed range from 30 metres (100 ft) to more than 50 metres (160 ft), depending on the breathing gas used and the availability of a decompression chamber nearby or on site. Commercial diving using scuba is generally restricted for reasons of occupational health and safety. Surface supplied diving allows better control of the operation and eliminates or significantly reduces the risks of loss of breathing gas supply and losing the diver. Scientific and media diving applications may be exempted from commercial diving constraints, based on acceptable codes of practice and a self-regulatory system.

=== Endurance and lateral range ===
Endurance is the duration that the breathing gas supply will last during a dive. It depends on the available gas supply, and gas consumption, which depends on fitness, exertion, and for open circuit scuba, on depth. The distance that can be travelled during this time depends on propulsion efficiency, which depends on whether the diver is swimming under their own power or using a diver propulsion vehicle. Finning efficiency depends on fitness, fin type, finning style and hydrodynamic drag, which depends on equipment type and configuration, and diver trim. In general terms scuba divers are slow and inefficient at best, but highly maneuverable. Use of a diver propulsion vehicle can extend the range capability by a large margin, depending on the power and endurance of the DPV and streamlining of the diver.

== Applications ==
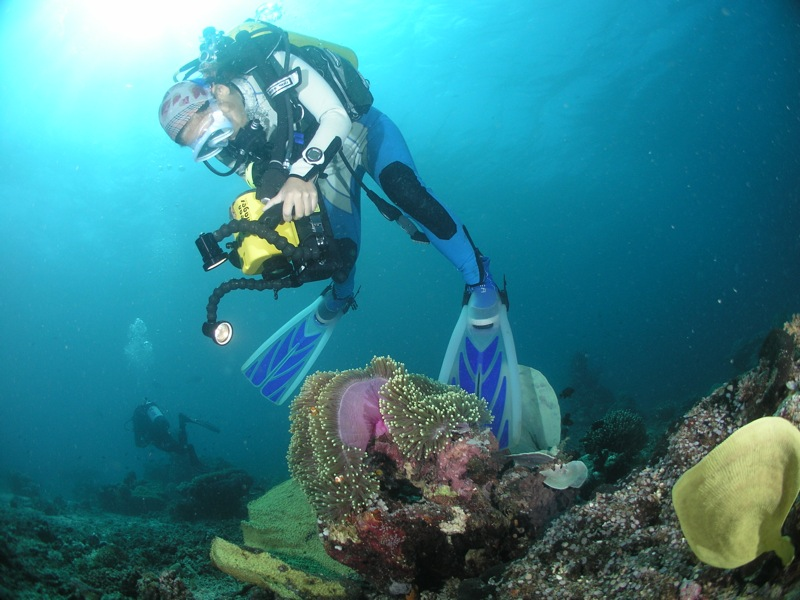
Shooting underwater video on scuba

Scuba diving may be performed for a number of reasons, both personal and professional.

=== Recreational scuba ===
Recreational diving is done purely for enjoyment and has a number of technical disciplines to increase interest underwater, such as cave diving, wreck diving, ice diving and deep diving. Underwater tourism is mostly done on scuba and the associated tour guiding must follow suit. There are divers who work, full or part-time, in the recreational diving community as instructors, assistant instructors, divemasters and dive guides. In some jurisdictions, the professional nature, with particular reference to responsibility for health and safety of the clients, of recreational diver instruction, dive leadership for reward and dive guiding is recognised and regulated by national legislation.

In many countries recreational diving is either not mentioned at all in laws and regulations, or specifically excluded from regulations covering occupational diving. In others, only diver training and dive-leading activities where the diver is either employed or takes a leadership position where they are responsible for the safety of others is covered by legislation. At the other extreme, countries such as Israel have statutory law covering all recreational diving activities.

The reasons to dive for recreational purposes are many and varied, and many divers will go through stages when their personal reasons for diving change, as the initial novelty of the alien environment becomes familiar and skills develop to the point where the diver is able to pay more attention to the surroundings. They may progress to developing skills needed for more challenging environments, or add compatible activities like photography, exploration, and recording aspects of the environment. Recreational diving in reasonably good conditions which are comfortably managed by the diver can produce health benefits of mood improvement.

=== Professional scuba ===
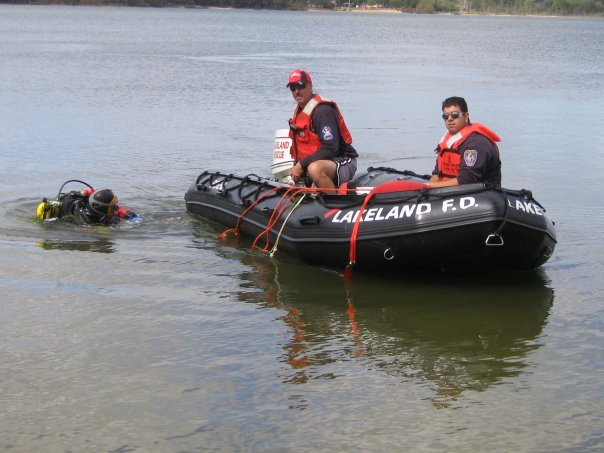
Nesconset fire department scuba rescue team on training exercise

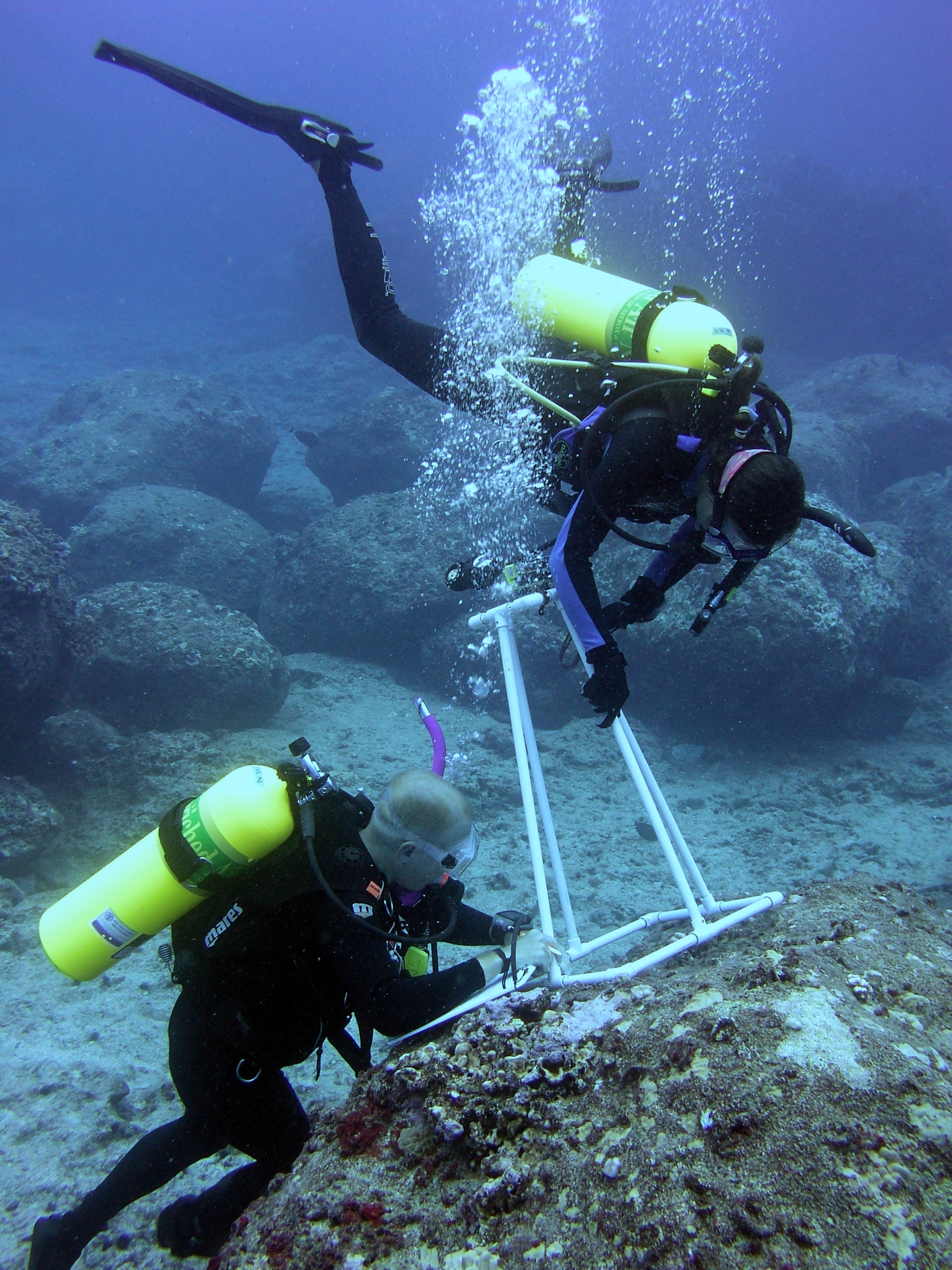
A marine biologist records algal diversity within a photoquadrat during an underwater survey at Midway Atoll, Hawaii, Northwestern Hawaiian Islands.

Divers may be employed professionally to perform tasks underwater. Some of these tasks are suitable for scuba. The choice between scuba and surface-supplied diving equipment is based on both legal and logistical constraints. Where the diver requires mobility and a large range of movement, scuba is usually the choice if safety and legal constraints allow. Higher risk work, particularly in commercial diving, may be restricted to surface-supplied equipment by legislation and codes of practice.

Underwater maintenance and research in large aquariums and fish farms, and harvesting of marine biological resources such as fish, abalones, crabs, lobsters, scallops, and sea crayfish may be done on scuba. Boat and ship underwater hull inspection, cleaning and some aspects of maintenance (ships husbandry) may be done on scuba by commercial divers and boat owners or crew.

Other specialist areas of scuba diving include military diving, with a long history of military frogmen in various roles. Their roles include direct combat, infiltration behind enemy lines, placing mines or using a manned torpedo, bomb disposal or engineering operations. In civilian operations, many police forces operate police diving teams to perform "search and recovery" or "search and rescue" operations and to assist with the detection of crime which may involve bodies of water. In some cases diver rescue teams may also be part of a fire department, paramedical service or lifeguard unit, and may be classed as public safety diving.

There are also professional divers involved with underwater environments, such as underwater photographers or underwater videographers, who document the underwater world, or scientific diving, including marine biology, geology, hydrology, oceanography and underwater archaeology. This work is normally done on scuba as it provides the necessary mobility. Rebreathers may be used when the noise of open-circuit would alarm the subjects or the bubbles could interfere with the images. Scientific diving under the OSHA (US) exemption has been defined as being diving work done by persons with, and using, scientific expertise to observe, or gather data on, natural phenomena or systems to generate non-proprietary information, data, knowledge or other products as a necessary part of a scientific, research or educational activity, following the direction of a diving safety manual and a diving control safety board.

== Safety ==
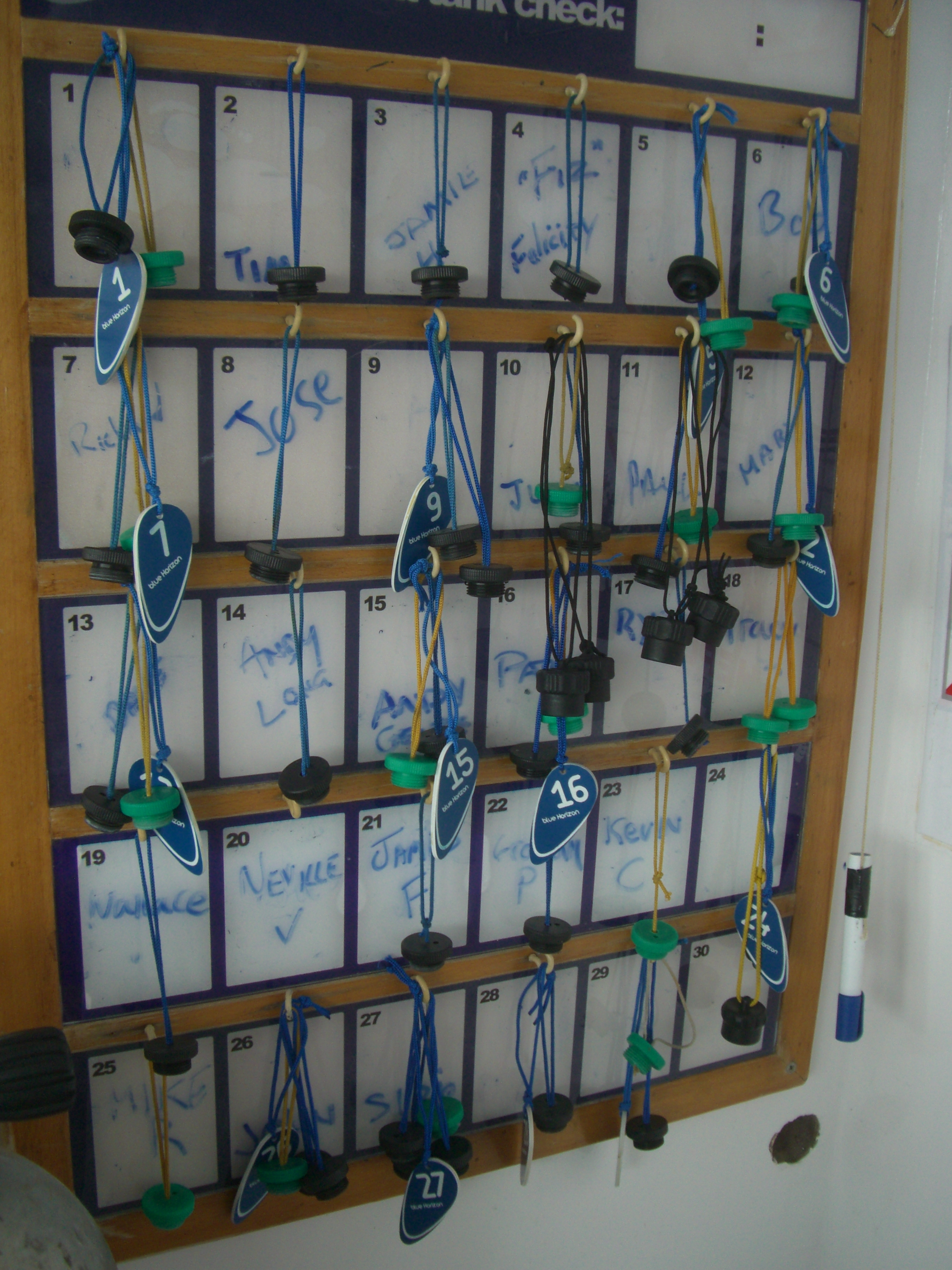
Dive tag board to ensure that all divers are back on board before the boat leaves the site

The "Alpha" or "Alfa" flag (left) and red-and-white flag (right), both meaning "I have a diver down; keep well clear at slow speed"

The safety of underwater diving depends on four factors: the environment, the equipment, behaviour of the individual diver and performance of the dive team. The underwater environment can impose severe physical and psychological stress on a diver, and is mostly beyond the diver's control. Scuba equipment allows the diver to operate underwater for limited periods, and the reliable function of some of the equipment is critical to even short-term survival. Other equipment allows the diver to operate in relative comfort and efficiency. The performance of the individual diver depends on learned skills, many of which are not intuitive, and the performance of the team depends on competence, communication and common goals.

There is a large range of hazards to which the diver may be exposed. These each have associated consequences and risks, which should be taken into account during dive planning. Where risks are marginally acceptable it may be possible to mitigate the consequences by setting contingency and emergency plans in place, so that injury or damage can be minimised where reasonably practicable. The acceptable level of risk varies depending on legislation, codes of practice and personal choice, with recreational divers having a greater freedom of choice.

=== Hazards ===
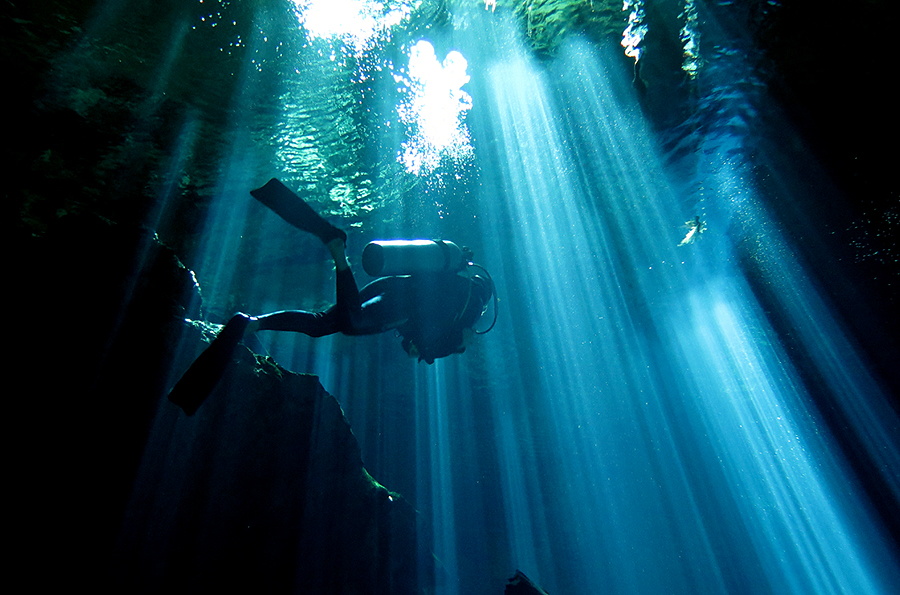
Scuba diving in a cave

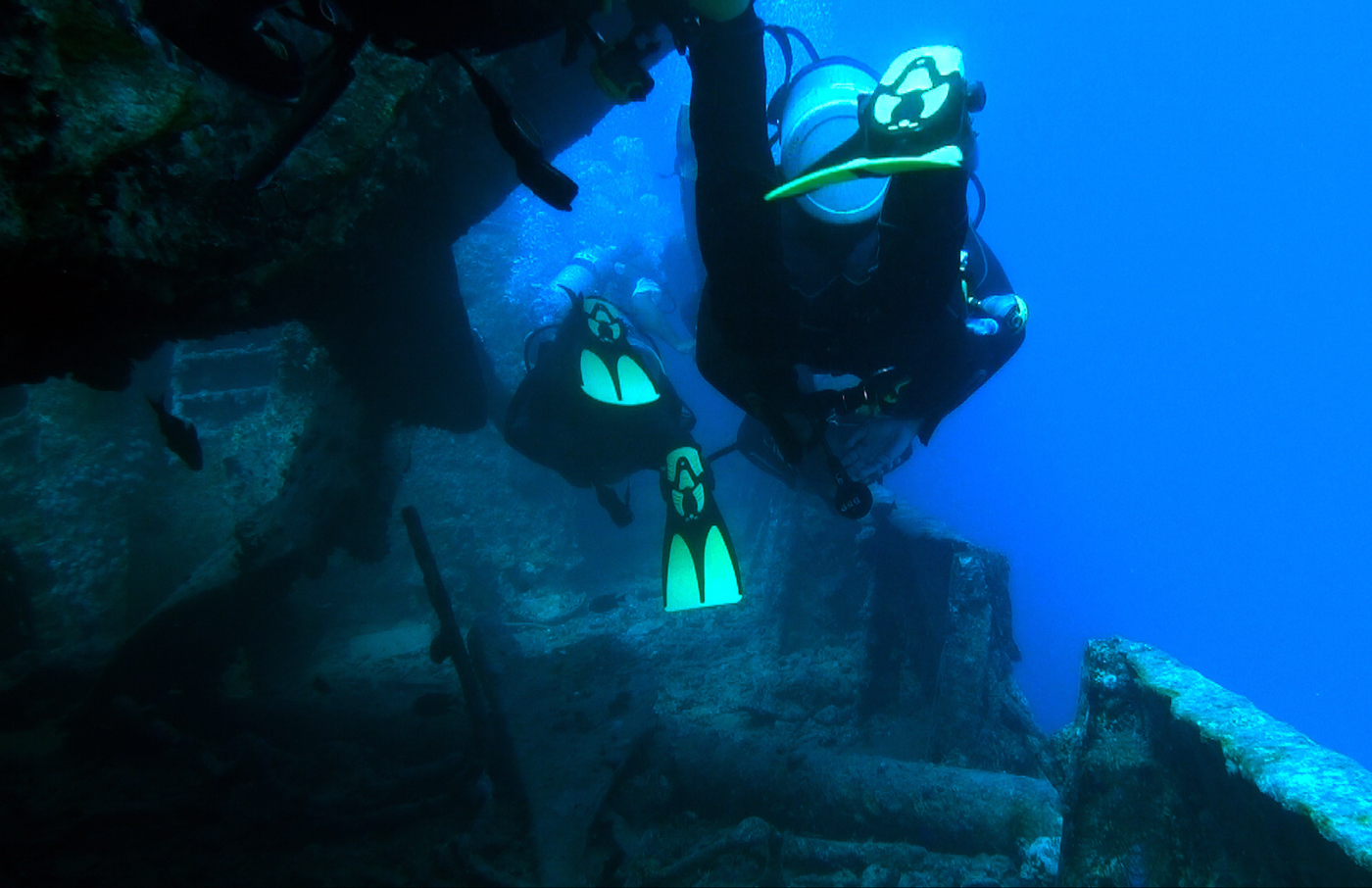
Divers touring a World War II shipwreck

Divers operate in an environment for which the human body is not well suited. They face special physical and health risks when they go underwater or use high pressure breathing gas. The consequences of diving incidents range from merely annoying to rapidly fatal, and the result often depends on the equipment, skill, response and fitness of the diver and diving team. The hazards include the aquatic environment, the use of breathing equipment in an underwater environment, exposure to a pressurised environment and pressure changes, particularly pressure changes during descent and ascent, and breathing gases at high ambient pressure. Diving equipment other than breathing apparatus is usually reliable, but has been known to fail, and loss of buoyancy control or thermal protection can be a major burden which may lead to more serious problems. There are also hazards of the specific diving environment, and hazards related to access to and egress from the water, which vary from place to place, and may also vary with time and tide. Hazards inherent in the diver include pre-existing physiological and psychological conditions and the personal behaviour and competence of the individual. For those pursuing other activities while diving, there are additional hazards of task loading, of the dive task and of special equipment associated with the task.

The presence of a combination of several hazards simultaneously is common in diving, and the effect is generally increased risk to the diver. Many diving fatalities are the result of a cascade of incidents overwhelming the diver, who should be able to manage any single reasonably foreseeable incident. Although there are many dangers in scuba diving, divers can decrease the risks through effective responses and appropriate equipment. The requisite skills are acquired by education and training, and honed by practice. Entry level certification programmes highlight diving physiology, safe diving practices, and diving hazards, but do not provide the diver with sufficient practice to become truly adept.

Scuba diving in relatively hazardous environments such as caves and wrecks, areas of strong water movement, relatively great depths, with decompression obligations, with equipment that has more complex failure modes, and with gases that are not safe to breathe at all depths of the dive requires specialised safety and emergency procedures tailored to the specific hazards, and often specialised equipment. These conditions are generally associated with technical diving.

=== Risk ===
The risk of dying during recreational, scientific or commercial diving is small, and on scuba, deaths are usually associated with poor gas management, poor buoyancy control, emergency ascent, equipment misuse or failure, entrapment and entanglement, rough water conditions and pre-existing health problems. Some fatalities are inevitable and caused by unforeseeable situations escalating out of control, but the majority of scuba diving fatalities can be attributed to human error on the part of the victim. Equipment failure is rare in well-maintained open-circuit scuba that has been set up and tested correctly before the dive. Fatality rates are comparable with jogging (13 deaths per 100,000 people per year) and are within the range where reduction is desirable by Health and Safety Executive (HSE) criteria, The most common injuries and causes of death were drowning or asphyxia due to inhalation of water, air embolism and cardiac events. The risk of cardiac arrest is greater for older divers, and greater for men than women, although the risks are equal by age 65.

According to death certificates, over 80% of the deaths were ultimately attributed to drowning, but other factors usually combined to incapacitate the diver in a sequence of events culminating in drowning, which is more a consequence of the medium in which the accidents occurred than the actual accident. Scuba divers should not drown unless there are other contributory factors as they carry a supply of breathing gas and equipment designed to provide the gas on demand. Drowning occurs as a consequence of preceding problems such as unmanageable stress, cardiac disease, pulmonary barotrauma, unconsciousness from any cause, water aspiration, trauma, environmental hazards, equipment difficulties, inappropriate response to an emergency or failure to manage the gas supply, and often obscures the real cause of death. Air embolism is also frequently cited as a cause of death, and it, too, is the consequence of other factors leading to an uncontrolled and badly managed ascent, possibly aggravated by pre-existing medical conditions. About a quarter of diving fatalities are associated with cardiac events, mostly in older divers. There is a fairly large body of data on diving fatalities, but in many cases the data is poor due to the standard of investigation and reporting, or withholding information for fear of litigation or privacy concerns. This hinders research that could improve diver safety. Plausible contributing factors that have been suggested but not yet empirically validated include inexperience, infrequent diving, inadequate supervision, insufficient pre-dive briefings, buddy separation and dive conditions beyond the diver's training, experience or physical capacity.

Decompression sickness and arterial gas embolism in recreational diving have been associated with specific demographic, environmental, and diving behavioural factors. A statistical study published in 2005 tested potential risk factors: age, asthma, body mass index, gender, smoking, cardiovascular disease, diabetes, previous decompression illness, years since certification, number of dives in the previous year, number of consecutive diving days, number of dives in a repetitive series, depth of the previous dive, use of nitrox as breathing gas, and use of a dry suit. No significant associations with risk of decompression sickness or arterial gas embolism were found for asthma, body mass index, cardiovascular disease, diabetes or smoking. Greater dive depth, previous decompression illness, number of consecutive days diving, and male sex were associated with higher risk for decompression sickness and arterial gas embolism. The use of dry suits and nitrox breathing gas, greater frequency of diving in the previous year, greater age, and more years since certification were associated with lower risk, possibly as indicators of more extensive training and experience.

Risk management has four major aspects besides equipment and training: Risk assessment, emergency planning, insurance cover, and constantly monitoring the progress of the dive and updating the perceived risk, and when appropriate, adapting the dive plan to suit. The risk assessment for a dive is primarily a planning activity, and may range in formality from a part of the pre-dive buddy check for recreational divers, to a safety file with professional risk assessment and detailed emergency plans for professional diving projects. Some form of pre-dive briefing is customary with organised recreational dives, and this generally includes a recitation by the divemaster of the known and predicted hazards, the risk associated with the significant ones, and the procedures to be followed in case of the reasonably foreseeable emergencies associated with them. Insurance cover for diving accidents may not be included in standard policies. There are a few organisations that focus specifically on diver safety and insurance cover, such as the international Divers Alert Network

=== Fitness to dive ===
Fitness to dive (more specifically medical fitness to dive) refers to the medical and physical suitability of a person to function safely in an underwater environment using diving equipment and related procedures. Depending on the circumstances, it may be established with a signed statement by the diver that they do not have any of the listed disqualifying conditions, or may involve a detailed medical examination by a physician registered as a medical examiner of divers following a procedural checklist. A legal document of fitness to dive issued by the medical examiner may be necessary. Psychological factors can also affect fitness to dive, particularly where they affect response to emergencies, or risk-taking behavior, and the use of medical and recreational drugs can influence fitness to dive, both for physiological and behavioral reasons. A person unfit to dive is considered to be at higher risk of injury or death in a diving accident.

==== Medications commonly used by scuba divers ====
There are no specific studies that give objective values for the effects and risks of most medications if used while diving, and their interactions with the physiological effects of diving. Any advice given by a medical practitioner is based on educated (to a greater or lesser extent), but unproven assumption, and each case is best evaluated by an expert. Medication types that are routinely used by many divers include:

- For prevention of motion sickness
- Decongestants for keeping the eustachian tubes and sinuses open
- Malaria prophylaxis (regional)
- Anti-inflammatories and analgesics
- Cardiovascular and hypertension medication
- Antacids and gastric acid suppression medication
- Contraceptives

=== Emergencies ===
A scuba diving emergency is an incident while scuba diving, in which there is a high probability of death or severe injury if the problem is not resolved quickly. A diving emergency may be related to life-support, decompression stress and barotraume, incapacitation or inability to cope, or an acute medical problem.

==== Life support ====
The most urgent scuba emergency is running out of breathing gas under water, often referred to as an out-of-air incident. It is a true emergency, as without access to breathing gas the diver will die within a few minutes. Other interruptions to the breathing gas supply, such as regulator malfunctions, dislodging of the regulator or full-face mask, rolling off of the cylinder valve, may become emergencies if not managed promptly and effectively, though for a competent diver most of these should be inconveniences rather than emergencies if there are no compounding factors. Various situations can occur which if not managed in time will become out of gas emergencies. Loss of the continuous guideline in an overhead environment when out of sight of the exit will eventually lead to an out of gas emergency, so it is always a real emergency, but the urgency depends on when it happens. The urgency of entanglement or entrapment emergencies depends on the specific circumstances. If the entrapment is not rectified soon enough, it will lead to an out of gas emergency or a decompression emergency. This is a class of emergency where a competent buddy may well be invaluable, as they may be able to disentangle or cut the diver free more easily due to better access to, and view of, the entangling materials.

Most scuba diving, particularly recreational scuba, uses a breathing gas supply mouthpiece that is gripped by the diver's teeth, and which can be dislodged relatively easily by impact. This is generally easily rectified unless the diver is incapacitated, and the associated skills are part of entry-level training. The problem becomes severe and immediately life-threatening if the diver loses both consciousness and the mouthpiece. Rebreather mouthpieces that are open when out of the mouth may let in water which can flood the loop, making them unable to deliver breathing gas, and will lose buoyancy as the gas escapes, thus putting the diver in a situation of two simultaneous life-threatening problems. Skills to manage this situation are a necessary part of training for the specific configuration. Full-face masks reduce these risks and are generally preferred for professional scuba diving, but can make emergency gas sharing difficult, and are less popular with recreational divers who often rely on gas sharing with a buddy as their breathing gas redundancy option.

==== Decompression stress and barotrauma ====
A decompression emergency occurs when the diver cannot safely complete necessary decompression while ascending. This could be due to insufficient breathing gas, inability to maintain depth at stops, or a more pressing need to surface. The urgency and severity of the emergency depends on the level of decompression stress and the risk of symptomatic decompression developing. Symptomatic decompression illness may develop during or after ascent. The urgency depends on the amount of compromised decompression, and on symptoms and when they occur. A decompression emergency is likely to develop into a medical emergency.

Irretrievable loss of buoyancy control can be an emergency depending on when it occurs, whether it is a loss of buoyancy (e.g., BC failure, catastrophic dry suit flood), or an excess of buoyancy (loss of weights, insufficient weighting at end of deco dive, dry suit inversion with complications), whether there is enough breathing gas in reserve, and whether there is a decompression obligation. Insufficient weighting at the end of a dive when no weights have been lost is usually an indication of inadequate training and failure of the diver to take responsibility for their own safety, and is usually caused by the diver not adequately checking that they are correctly weighted for the dive

==== Incapacitation ====
Any loss of consciousness underwater is an emergency that requires the immediate intervention of a rescuer to prevent drowning. Potential causes include: CNS oxygen toxicity, Hypoxia, a contaminated breathing gas supply, carbon dioxide toxicity due to rebreather scrubber breakthrough, or overwhelming work of breathing.

A dry suit flooding in frigid water presents combined risks from buoyancy loss and hypothermia. This is not as urgent as breathing emergencies, but can be a definite risk to life. Similarly, diver exhaustion may prevent a diver from taking necessary action to get to a place of safety, such as returning to the exit point, getting out of the water, or keeping their airway secure.

Panic or nitrogen narcosis may lead to inappropriate actions which may trigger another emergency condition, or cause inappropriate response to a contingency, causing it to deteriorate to an emergency.

==== Medical conditions ====
Diving specific medical emergencies include barotrauma, decompression sickness, immersion pulmonary edema, arterial gas embolism, carbon monoxide poisoning, carbon dioxide toxicity, oxygen toxicity and nitrogen narcosis. Cardiovascular emergency, major trauma, envenomation and other general medical emergencies are usually not practicable to treat in the water, so it is urgent for the diver to surface and get appropriate first aid as soon as possible without causing more serious injury through haste.

==== Buddy separation ====
Some organisations class buddy separation as an emergency, but for competent and adequately equipped divers it is more of an inconvenience, and for solo divers there is no buddy to be separated from. The urgency of buddy separation depends on circumstances, but is usually of low urgency provided both divers are competent and properly equipped, and neither is experiencing another emergency requiring the presence of a buddy. Buddy separation may represent a critical loss of equipment redundancy, but no immediate danger to life and health in most situations.

== Training and certification ==
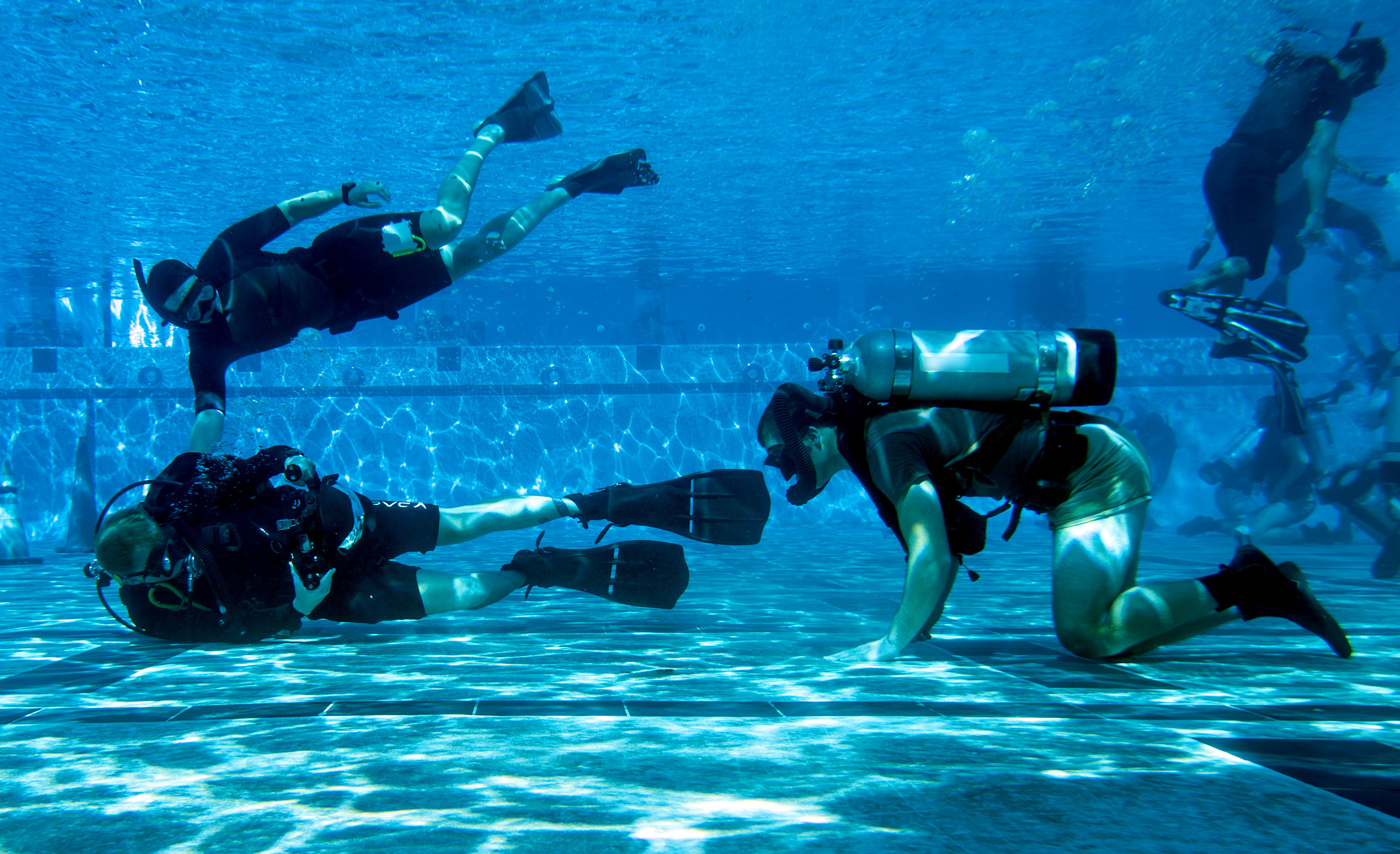
US Navy SEAL divers train in 2019

Scuba training is normally provided by a qualified diving instructor who is a member of one or more diver certification agencies or is registered with a government agency. Basic diver training entails the learning of knowledge and skills required for the safe conduct of activities in an underwater environment, and includes procedures and skills for the use of diving equipment, safety, emergency self-help and rescue procedures, dive planning, and use of dive tables or a personal dive computer.

Scuba skills which an entry-level diver will normally learn include:

- Preparing and dressing in the diving suit
- Assembly and pre-dive testing of the scuba set.
- Entries and exits between the water and the shore or boat.
- Breathing from the demand valve
- Recovering and clearing the demand valve.
- Clearing water from the mask, and replacing a dislodged mask.
- Buoyancy control using weights and buoyancy compensator, including achieving positive, negative and neutral buoyancy at the surface and in midwater. Selection of appropriate weights.
- Finning techniques, underwater mobility and manoeuvering.
- Making safe and controlled descents and ascents.
- Equalisation of the ears and other air spaces.
- Assisting another diver by providing air from one's own supply, and receiving air supplied by another diver.
- How to return to the surface without injury in the event of a breathing gas supply interruption.
- Use of emergency gas supply systems (professional divers).
- Diving hand signals used to communicate underwater. Professional divers will also learn other methods of communication.
- Dive management skills such as monitoring depth and time and the breathing gas supply.
- Buddy diving procedures, including response to buddy separation underwater.
- Basic dive planning regarding choice of entry and exit points, planned maximum depth and time to remain within no-decompression limits.
- Limited recognition of hazards, emergency procedures, and medical evacuation may be included. Professional divers will be trained in basic first aid.
- Swimming in currents and wave surge
- Remove and refit certain items of equipment while in or under the water

Some knowledge of physiology and the physics of diving is considered necessary by most diver certification agencies, as the diving environment is alien and relatively hostile to humans. The physics and physiology knowledge required is fairly basic, and helps the diver to understand the effects of the diving environment so that informed acceptance of the associated risks is possible. The physics mostly relates to gases under pressure, buoyancy, heat loss, and optics underwater. The physiology relates the physics to the effects on the human body, to provide a basic understanding of the causes and risks of barotrauma, decompression sickness, gas toxicity, hypothermia, drowning and sensory variations. More comprehensive training often involves first aid and rescue skills, skills related to a wider range of diving equipment, and underwater work skills.

=== Recreational ===
Scuba diving education levels as used by ISO, PADI, CMAS, SSI and NAUI

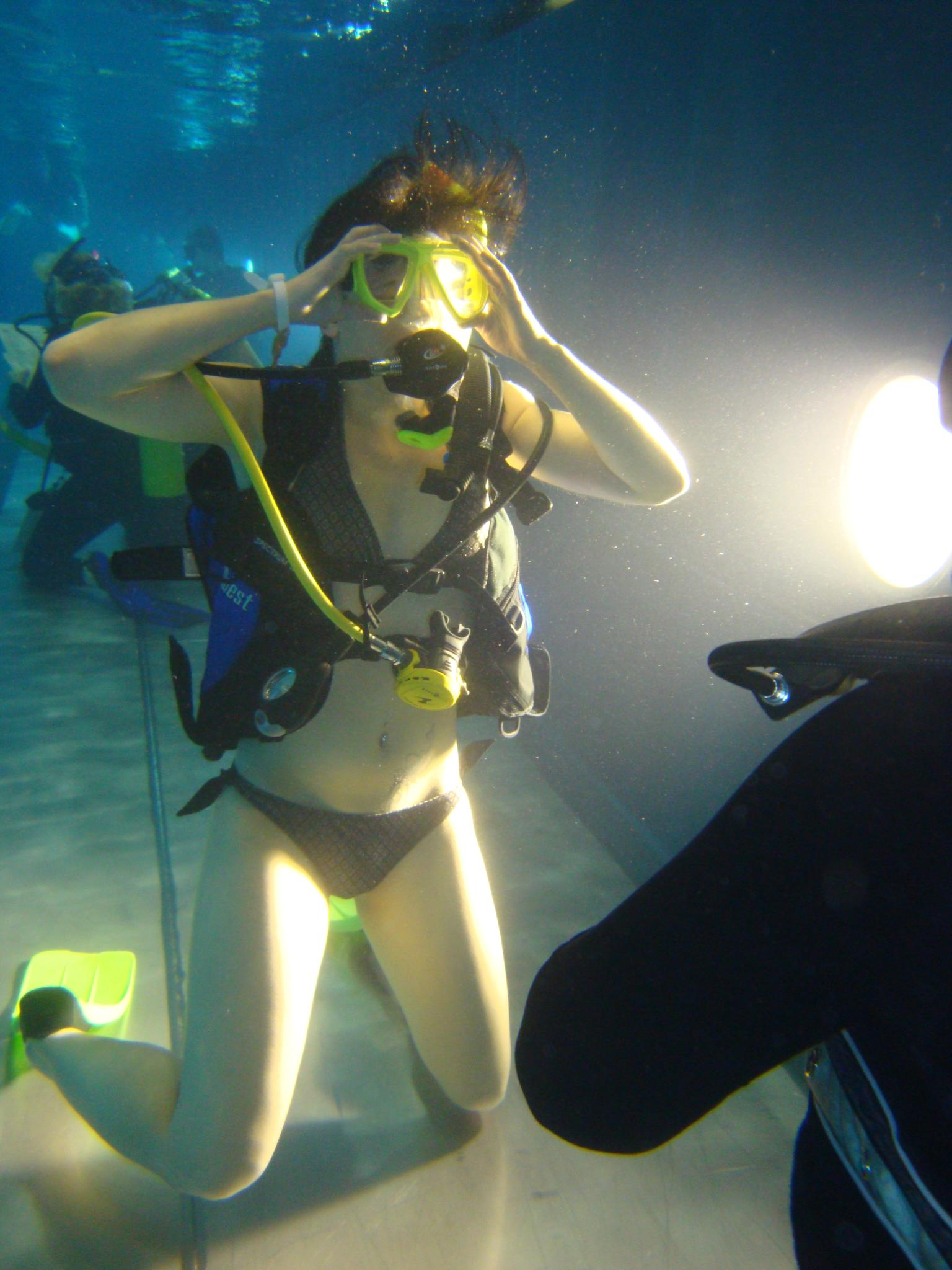
Basic diving skills training in a swimming pool. This diver is undergoing an exercise in purging water from her mask while submerged.

Recreational diver training is the process of developing knowledge and understanding of the basic principles, and the skills and procedures for the use of scuba equipment so that the diver is able to dive for recreational purposes with acceptable risk using the type of equipment and in similar conditions to those experienced during training. Recreational (including technical) scuba diving does not have a centralised certifying or regulatory agency and is mostly self-regulated. There are, however, several international organisations of varying size and market share that train and certify divers, dive leaders, and dive instructors, and many diving related sales and rental outlets require proof of diver certification from one of these organisations prior to selling or renting certain diving products or services.

Not only is the underwater environment hazardous but the diving equipment itself can be dangerous. There are problems that divers must learn to avoid and manage when they do occur. Divers need repeated practice and a gradual increase in the challenge to develop and internalise the skills needed to control the equipment, to respond effectively if they encounter difficulties, and to build confidence in their equipment and themselves. Diver practical training starts with simple but essential procedures and builds on them until complex procedures can be managed effectively. This may be broken up into several short training programmes, with certification issued for each stage, or combined into a few more substantial programmes with certification issued when all the skills have been mastered.

Many organizations exist, throughout the world, offering diver training leading to certification: the issuing of "diving certification cards", also known as a "C-cards", or qualification cards. This diving certification model originated at Scripps Institution of Oceanography in 1952 after two divers died while using university-owned equipment and the SIO instituted a system where a card was issued after training as evidence of competence. Diving instructors affiliated to a diving certification agency may work independently or through a university, a dive club, a dive school or a dive shop. They will offer courses that should meet, or exceed, the standards of the certification organization that will certify the divers attending the course. Certification of the diver is done by the certification organisation on application by the registered instructor.

The International Organization for Standardization (ISO) has approved several ISO recreational diving standards that may be implemented worldwide, and some of the standards developed by the World Recreational Scuba Training Council and Rebreather Training Council are consistent with the applicable ISO Standards, as are equivalent standards published by the Confédération Mondiale des Activités Subaquatiques and the European Underwater Federation

The initial open water training for a person who is medically fit to dive and a reasonably competent swimmer is relatively short. Many dive shops in popular holiday locations offer courses intended to teach a novice to dive in a few days, which can be combined with diving on the vacation. Other instructors and dive schools will provide more thorough training, which generally takes longer. Dive operators, dive shops, and cylinder filling stations may refuse to allow uncertified people to dive with them, hire diving equipment or have their diving cylinders filled. This may be an agency standard, company policy, or specified by legislation.

=== Professional ===
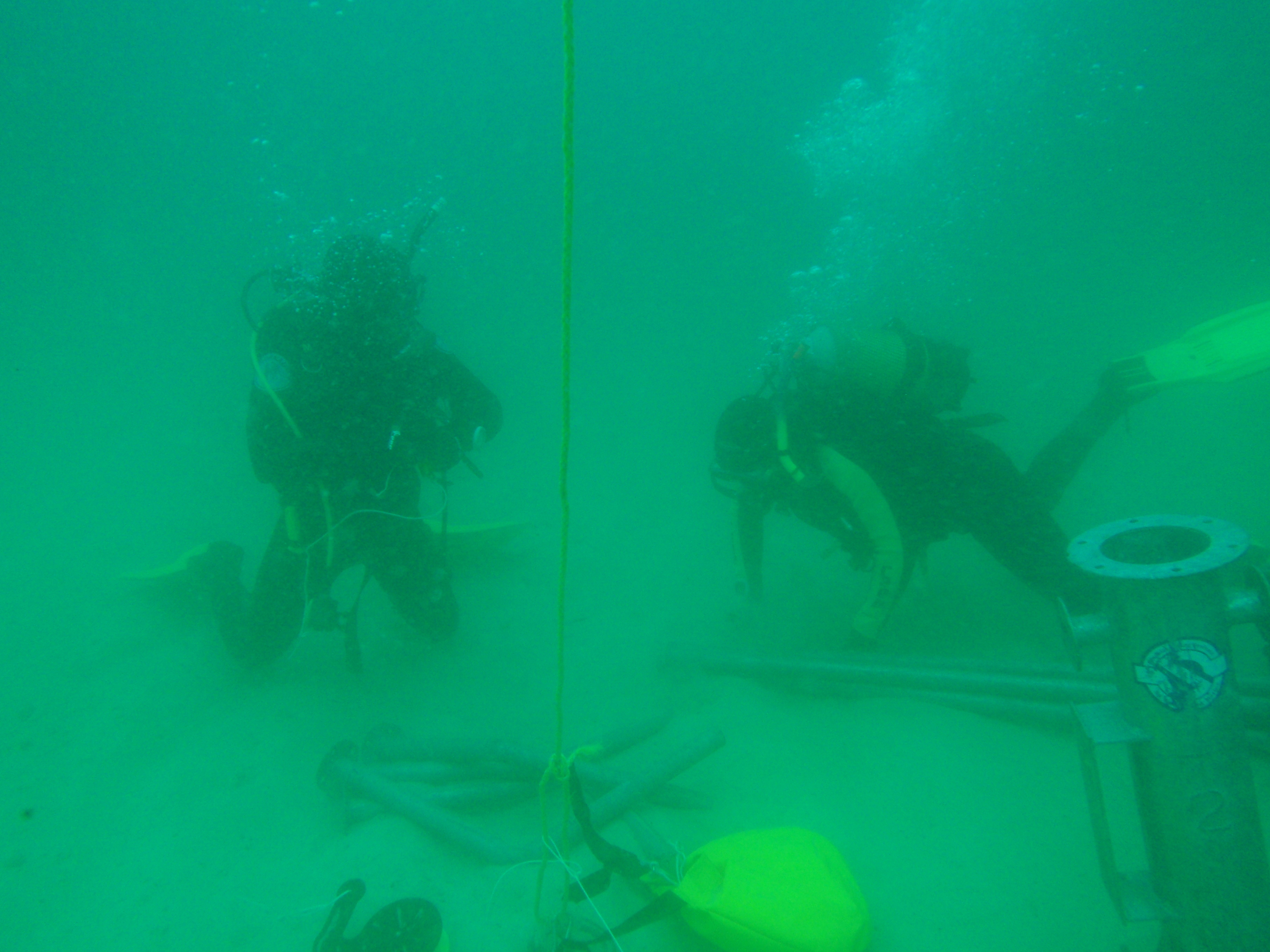
Class IV scientific divers assembling a structure during a training exercise

It is fairly common for a national standard for commercial diver training and registration to apply within a country. These standards may be set by national government departments and empowered by national legislation, for example, in the case of the United Kingdom, where the standards are set by the Health and Safety Executive, and South Africa where they are published by the Department of Employment and Labour. Many national training standards and the associated diver registrations are recognised internationally among the countries which are members of the International Diving Regulators and Certifiers Forum (IDRCF). A similar arrangement exists for state-legislated standards, as in the case of Canada and Australia. Registration of professional divers trained to these standards may be directly administered by government, as in the case of South Africa, where diver registration is done by the Department of Employment and Labour, or by an approved external agent, as in the case of the Australian Diver Accreditation Scheme (ADAS)

The European Diving Technology Committee eV. (EDTC) is an association registered in Kiel, Federal Republic of Germany for the purpose of making professional diving safer by creating international standards. Membership is open to all countries of the continent of Europe, with each country having one representative from the medical, industrial, government and trade union sectors. Some major diving industry associations are also involved. As of May 2016, 22 nations and 6 international non-governmental organisations were represented in the EDTC.

These standards include Commercial SCUBA Diver, which requires the professional scuba diver to be certified as medically fit to dive, and competent in skills covering the scope of:

- Administrative procedures relating to statutory requirements, employment conditions, health and safety at the workplace, and the basic theoretical grounding in physics, physiology and medicine that are relevant to their work as a diver.
- The skills required for routine diving operations, including working as part of the diving team, planning of diving operations, and diving in open water, exposed to the normal hazards of the diving environment, decompression procedures, serving as attendant to another diver, communications and the safe use of the tools appropriate to the work.
- The skills in emergency procedures for management of reasonably foreseeable emergencies, including standby diver skills for diver assistance and rescue, management of emergencies unaided where appropriate, and team procedures for handling emergencies.
- Preparation of diving and task-related equipment for use
- Provision of first aid and basic life support procedures in a diving emergency, and assistance, under supervision, in the treatment of diving disorders
- Competence to assist under supervision with chamber operations, including acting as inside attendant to an afflicted diver.

International Diving Schools Association (IDSA) provides a table of equivalence of various national commercial diver training standards.

Military scuba training is usually provided by the armed force's internal diver training facilities, to their specific requirements and standards, and generally involves basic scuba training, specific training related to the equipment used by the unit, and associated skills related to the particular unit. The general scope of requirements is similar to that for commercial divers, though standards of fitness and assessment may differ considerably.

Canadian Association for Underwater Science (CAUS), the CMAS Scientific Committee, and the American Academy of Underwater Sciences (AAUS), issue scientific scuba diving certifications. AAUS certifications can only be achieved by taking an AAUS course administered by a AAUS organizational member. Training for the AAUS scientific diving certification includes a relatively high level of training and proficiency in diving and the use of scientific practices and operations for research and education. In some countries scientific diving is legally considered commercial diving and the training, certification and registration are identical.

== Records ==
The current (2017) scuba depth record is held by Ahmed Gabr of Egypt who reached a depth of 332.35 metres (1,090.4 ft) in the Red Sea in 2014, however this record is under investigation due to evidence presented in 2020 suggesting it was faked. In which case the record would revert to 318 metres (1,043 ft) set by Nuno Gomes in 2005.

The record for cave penetration (horizontal distance from a known free surface) is held by Jon Bernot and Charlie Roberson of Gainesville, Florida, with a distance of 26,930 feet (8,210 m).

Jarrod Jablonski and Casey McKinlay completed a traverse from Turner Sink to Wakulla Springs, on 15 December 2007, covering a distance of nearly 36,000 feet (11 km). This traverse took approximately 7 hours, followed by 14 hours of decompression, and set the record as the longest cave diving traverse.

The current record for the longest continuous submergence using SCUBA gear was set by Mike Stevens of Birmingham, England at the National Exhibition Centre, Birmingham, during the annual National Boat, Caravan and Leisure Show between 14 February and 23 February 1986. He was continuously submerged for 212.5 hours. The record was ratified by the Guinness Book of Records.

== See also ==
Related historical topics:

- History of underwater diving – Developments over time in the human activity
- Timeline of diving technology – Chronological list of notable events in the history of underwater diving equipment
- Aqualung – Original name for open-circuit scuba equipment
- Frogman – Tactical scuba diver
- Vintage scuba – Early model scuba equipment and the ongoing activity of diving with it
- Standard diving dress – Copper helmet with rubberised canvas diving suit and weighted boots

Alternative modes of diving:

- Atmospheric suit diving – Diving in an articulated pressure resistant anthropomorphic housing
- Freediving – Underwater diving without breathing apparatus
- Hookah diving, also known as airline diving – Underwater diving using a basic air hose from the surface
- Saturation diving – Diving mode and decompression technique
- Snorkeling – Swimming while inhaling through a snorkel
- Surface-supplied diving – Underwater diving breathing gas supplied from the surface

Other:

- Artificial gills (human) – Hypothetical devices to extract oxygen from water
- Sea Hunt – American action adventure television series from 1958 to 1961
- U.S. Navy Diving Manual – Training and operations handbook
- Scuba diving therapy – Treatment using scuba diving activities
