= Recreational scuba certification levels =

Competence represented by recreational scuba certification

Recreational scuba certification levels are the levels of skill represented by recreational scuba certification. Each certification level is associated with a specific training standard published by the certification agency, and a training programme associated with the standard., though in some cases recognition of prior learning can apply. These levels of skill can be categorised in several ways:

- Core diving competence
- Dive leadership competence
- Specialist skills:
  - Special equipment skills
  - Special environment skills
  - Special activity skills
  - Safety and rescue skills
  - Diving support skills
  - Diver training skills

Certification indicates that a diver was assessed as meeting the minimum requirements in the prescribed range of skills for that certification by an instructor registered by the issuing agency at the time of assessment. Most certification is not limited by time, and does not require periodical reassessment, or even that the holder maintains the minimum level of specified skills, but there are exceptions, which may be indicated by an expiry date on the certification card. Certification requiring periodic update usually indicates a requirement to re-register with the agency and payment of membership fees, but may also be associated with a requirement to provide evidence of skill retention. This is common for dive leadership certification where the holder is in a position of trust or legal responsibility to clients, where the agency needs to maintain a level of due diligence.

== History ==
The history of recreational scuba certification is mostly the history of recreational scuba training, as the need for a method of identifying the competent diver was part of the reason for instituting formal training for recreational diving, following a number of fatal accidents involving untrained divers.

== Training standards ==
A diver training standard is a document issued by a certification, registration, regulation or quality assurance agency, that describes the prerequisites for participation, the aim of the training programme, the specific competences that a candidate must demonstrate to be assessed as competent, and the minimum required experience that must be recorded before the candidate can be registered or certified at a specific grade by the agency. Training standards allow objective comparison between the training provided by various agencies and the competence indicated by certification or registration to the specific standard, though in most cases, training and competence may exceed the minimum requirement much of the time, and variation between newly certified divers can be considerable, partly due to differences in the training, and partly due to qualities of the candidate. Training standards may narrowly prescribe the training, or may concentrate on assessment of exit level competence, and allow recognition of prior learning based on various forms of evidence. To be useful, a training standard must be sufficiently specific to allow agreement on the requirements by most readers reasonably competent in the field, including the instructors, assessors, and learners who must use it, and any quality assurance personnel who may need to enforce it. A training standard may be associated with a specific code of practice referring to how the training should be carried out and the facilities required.

== Core diving competence ==
Scuba diving education levels as used by ISO, PADI, CMAS, SSI and NAUI

This class of certification covers competence to dive within the scope of what is generally considered recreational open water diving, with no planned decompression obligations, a single air or nitrox breathing gas and relying on the buddy system or a dive leader for emergency management.

- Supervised diver specifies the training and certification for recreational scuba divers in international standard ISO 24801-1 and the equivalent European Standard EN 14153-1. Various diving organizations offer diving training that meets the requirements of the Supervised Diver. A diving certification which corresponds to the Supervised Diver allows for recreational diving under the direct supervision of a divemaster or recreational diving instructor in open water. Most diving organizations recommend not to exceed a diving depth of 10 to 12 metres. After the successful completion of training equivalent to the Supervised diver, training can be extended to the Autonomous diver certification level (according to ISO 24801-2). This level of certification is not universally accepted or available.
- Autonomous diver describes the minimum requirements for basic training and certification for recreational scuba divers in international standard ISO 24801-2 and the equivalent European Standard EN 14153-2. Various organizations offer training that meets the requirements of the Autonomous Diver standard. A certification which corresponds to Autonomous Diver allows for independent diving with a dive buddy in open water. Most training organizations do not recommend exceeding a depth of 18 or 20 meters at this level of certification. After completion this certification the training can be extended to a dive leader to ISO 24801-3 or an intermediate not defined by international standards. All recognised recreational diver training agencies issue at least one certification that meets or exceeds this standard, which has worldwide acceptance. Most infrequent divers never advance beyond this level of certification. These certificates are variously named by the issuing agencies, and include:
  - Open Water Diver (PADI, SSI)
  - CMAS* scuba diver
  - NAUI Scuba Diver

=== Certification exceeding Autonomous diver ===
Most certification agencies provide diving skills training and certification beyond the Autonomous diver standard:

- Advanced Open Water Diver (PADI, SSI)
- CMAS** scuba diver is a certification for recreational scuba diving issued by the Confédération Mondiale des Activités Subaquatiques (CMAS). which indicate that the diver has been found competent to dive in open water to a maximum depth of 40 meters, accompanied by another diver with equivalent or higher certification, with no dive leader required.
- Master Scuba Diver (NAUI)

== Dive leadership ==
- Rescue Diver is a certification level provided by several diver training agencies, such as PADI, and SDI, who refer to the certificate as "Rescue Diver", SSI, who call it "Diver Stress and Rescue", and NAUI, who call it "Scuba Rescue Diver" The training emphasises emergency response and diver rescue. The certification level is loosely equivalent the CMAS two star diver qualification and the BSAC Sports Diver, although the European courses tend to be longer and more intensive than their U.S. counterparts. Most organizations have a minimum age requirement of 15 to undertake the Rescue Diver training, although PADI does permit certification of "Junior" Rescue Divers. Rescue diver equivalent certification is generally a prerequisite for dive leadership training, as when working professionally, the dive leader may have a duty of care to the divers in the group, and the competence in rescue skills required for basic skills qualification is not generally considered sufficient in spite of the almost universal reliance on the buddy system for incident management in recreational diving.
- Dive leader describes the minimum requirements for dive leader training and certification for recreational scuba divers in international standard ISO 24801-3 and the equivalent European Standard EN 14153-3. Recreational dive leaders are considered competent to plan, organise and conduct dives and to lead other recreational divers on open water dives, and for specialised recreational scuba diving activities for which they have been trained. They are also considered competent to conduct emergency procedures associated with these activities and the relevant diving environment. They may require orientation for unfamiliar local environmental conditions. Additional specialised training and experience is required to lead divers on more demanding dives. The term is also used by BSAC for a specific certification. Various organizations offer training that meets the requirements of the dive leader standard. Some agencies use the title "Dive Leader" for their equivalent certification, but several other titles are also used, "Divemaster" may be the most widespread, but "Dive Supervisor" is also used, and should not be confused with the very different status and responsibilities of a professional diving supervisor. CMAS affiliates certifications which meet the requirements of CMAS three star diver should meet the standard by default.
- Diving instructor is the certification level for a person who trains and usually also assesses competence of divers. There are standards and programmes for training, competence and registration of diving instructors, as they have a duty of care to their clients, and operate in an environment with intrinsic hazards which may be unfamiliar to the lay person. Training and assessment of instructors will generally follow a diver training standard, but crossover training is often available for instructors who wish to register with a different agency to the one they originally were trained through. Crossover training may include recognition of prior learning for skills and knowledge requirements common to the relevant agencies. Recreational diving instructors are usually registered members of one or more recreational diver certification agencies, and are generally registered to train and assess divers against specified certification standards. Instructors are usually required to show that they are maintaining their skills and knowledge to the required level by training and registering at least a specified minimum number of divers per year, and are required to renew membership of the agency on an annual basis as a license to instruct.

== Specialist skills ==
Skills which are not directly required for open-water diving using standard recreational scuba equipment and the protocols taught for basic recreational diving may be taught and certification issued attesting to competence in those skills. There are a wide range of specialist skills, which may be categorised in the following basic groups. In many cases there is some overlap of category, as when a type of activity requires specific equipment, or when equipment is required for safety in a given environment, such as navigation and redundant gas supply in penetration dives.

=== Equipment related skills ===
Training programs with certification are available in:

- Rebreather diver – for semi-closed and closed circuit, with type endorsement for the model.
- Solo diver – The skills for self-reliant diving
- Sidemount diver – the skills for managing side-mounted scuba sets
- Dry suit diver – the safe use of a dry suit
- Diver navigation – underwater navigation for scuba divers, and to a lesser extent surface navigation while swimming.
- Technical diving – managing multiple breathing gases during a dive and obligatory staged decompression
  - Advanced nitrox diver – diving using more than one nitrogen based breathing gas or oxygen for decompression
  - Trimix diver (normoxic and hypoxic) – diving using breathing gases containing helium
  - Penetration diving – scuba diving under a hard overhead, and particularly the navigation skills to get back out.
    - Cavern diver – diving under a natural overhead where natural light is visible at all times
    - Cave diver – diving under a natural overhead out of the reach of natural light
    - Wreck diver – diving around and particularly inside the structure of sunken ships
- Underwater photographer

=== Environment related skills ===
- Altitude diver – Skills of modifying decompression schedules to compensate for surface atmospheric pressure at altitudes above 300m.
- Ice diver - Skills for diving under surface ice
- Wreck diver – Skills for diving in the close proximity to, and inside of, sunken shipwrecks.
- Deep diver – Skills for diving to depths greater than the maximum accepted by the training agency for divers without additional training.
- Cave diver – Skills for diving inside flooded caves and similar underground spaces under a hard overhead.
- Drift diver – Skills for diving in open water while transported by a natural current
- Night diver – Skills for diving during the hours of natural darkness between sunset and sunrise, when artificial light is necessary.
- Low visibility diving – Skills for diving in conditions where the turbidity of the water severely limits the range of vision
- Blue-water diving – Skills for diving in open water in good visibility where there is no natural visible reference for position or depth.

=== Activity related skills ===
- Search and recovery diver
- Underwater photographer

=== Diving support skills ===
These certifications do not necessarily license the holder to work on life support equipment to be used by another person. In some cases the certification aligns with legislation. In some cases the certification is the de facto industry standard for competence in a specific jurisdiction.

- Compressor operator – filling scuba cylinders with high pressure compressed breathing air
- Gas blender – filling high pressure cylinders with mixed breathing gases for scuba diving
- Equipment maintenance/DV servicing/Oxygen cleaning
- Diving first aid – skills for administering non-invasive first aid for the most common types of diving disorder
- Oxygen provider – extended first aid skill for diving disorders
- Diving endorsement for small boat skipper's operating licence
- Skipper's certificate

== International and inter-agency recognition ==
The International Organization for Standardization has approved recreational diving standards that may be implemented worldwide. There is generally an equivalent EN standard for each.

The listed standards developed by the (United States) RSTC are consistent with the applicable ISO Standards:

(USA) RSTC Standard	ISO Standard	Alternative ISO Title
Introductory Scuba Experience	No equivalent	
No equivalent	Level One Diver	Supervised Diver
Open Water Diver	Level Two Diver	Autonomous Diver
Dive Supervisor	Level Three Diver	Dive Leader
Assistant Instructor	Level 1 Instructor	
Scuba Instructor	Level 2 Instructor	
Instructor Trainer	No equivalent	
No equivalent	Service Provider	
