= Dive center =

Service organisation providing recreational diver training, equipment and dive outings

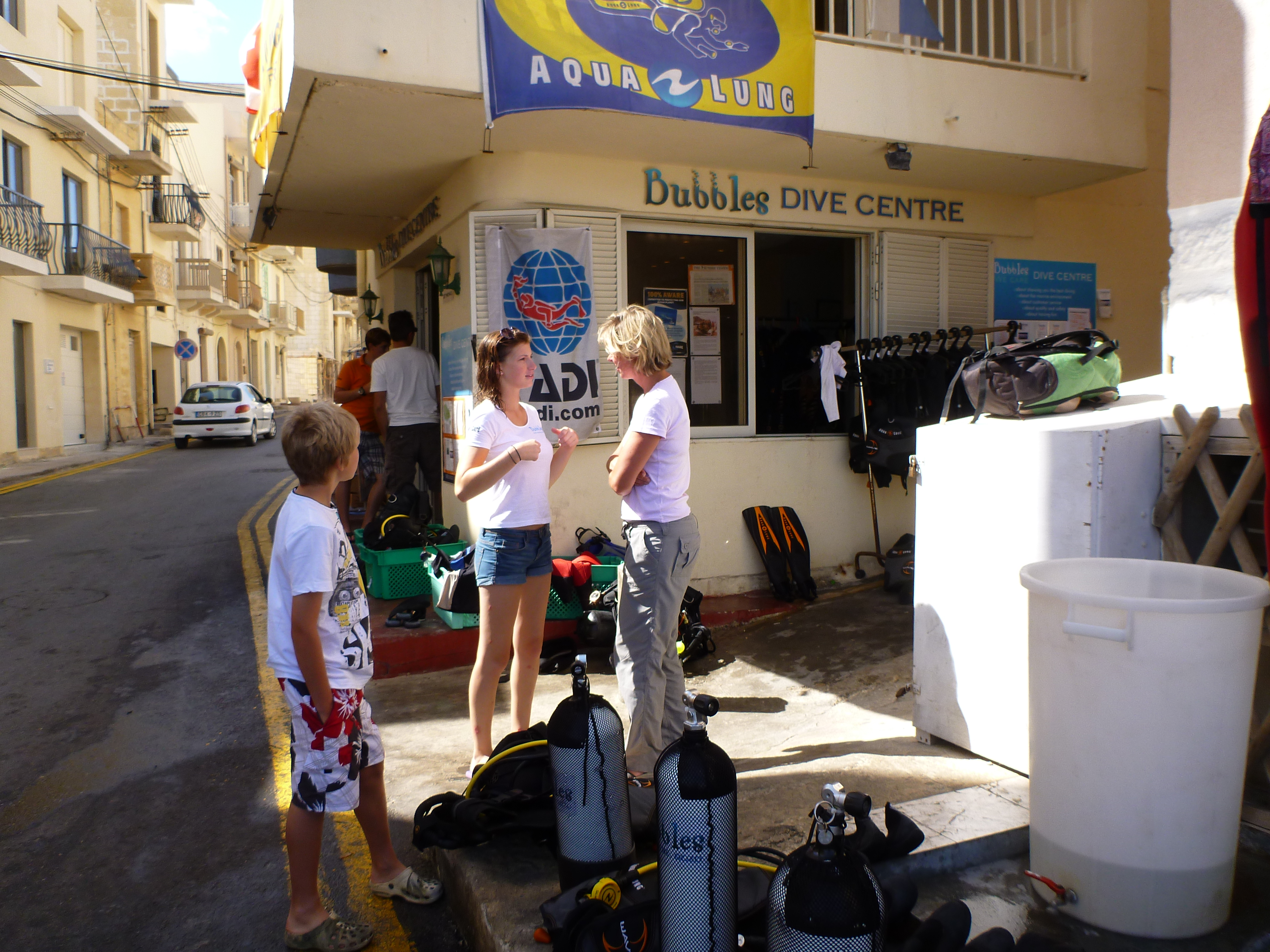
Dive center in Malta

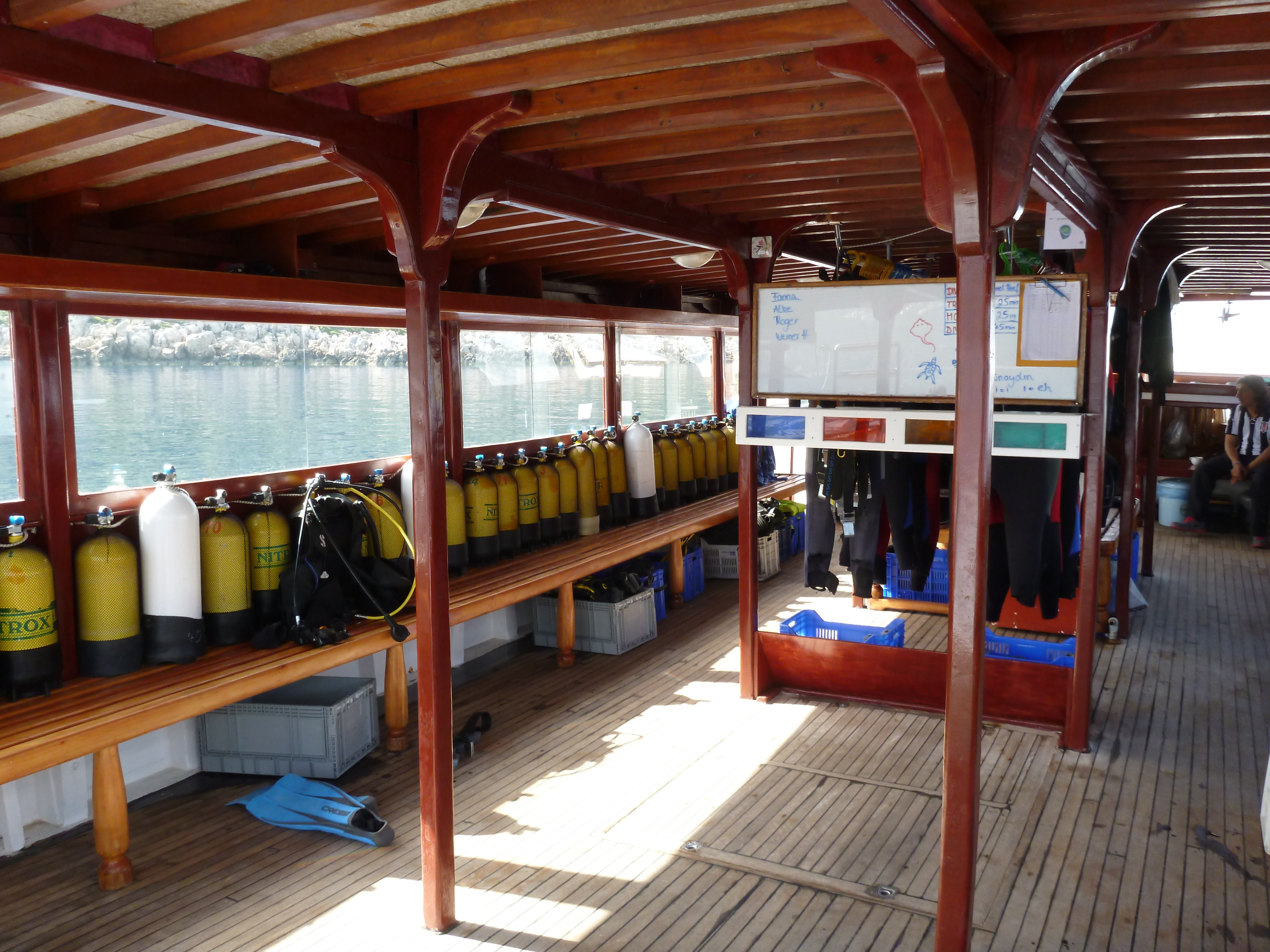
Scuba dive boat (mobile dive center) to organize dive trips on a daily basis

A dive center is the base location where recreational divers usually learn scuba diving or make guided dive trips at new locations. Many dive centers operate under the guidelines of ISO 24803, in which case the facilities must meet the ISO minimum standard for a service provider for recreational diving.

== Shop ==
Divers commonly refer to dive centers as dive shops. It is normally a shop selling diving equipment equipped with a diving air compressor to fill the cylinders. The dive center usually offers the facilities to repair and maintain scuba gear.

== Diver training and guided dives ==
Professional recreational diving instructors are often associated with, or employed by, a dive center. The center may be located near a swimming pool and open water, where training and guided dives can be conducted. Some operate boats or road transport and offer guided dives at recreational dive sites in the vicinity. Classrooms are often available for diver training which may include training according to ISO 24801-1 Supervised diver, ISO 24801-2 Autonomous diver and ISO 24801-3 Dive leader, and other courses according to the certification agency to which they are affiliated.

== Organization ==
Dive centers may be affiliated to one or more diver certification agencies to offer their beginner, advanced, professional or specialty courses.

== See also ==
- Pro shop, fulfilling similar functions in other sports
- Dive centers near eco hotels
