= Solo diving =

Recreational diving without a dive buddy

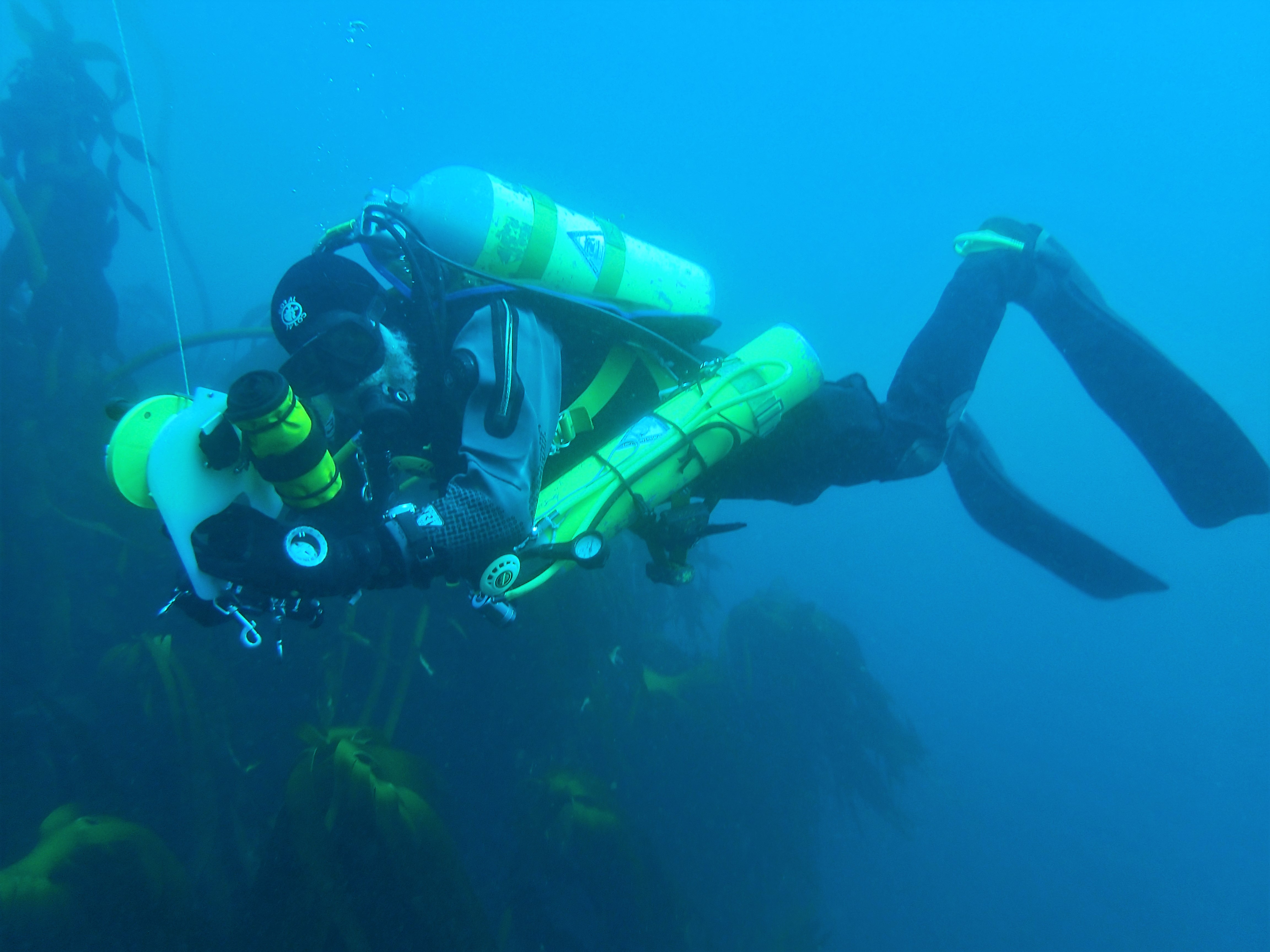
Solo diver surveying a dive site. The bailout cylinder can be seen slung at the diver's left side

Solo diving is the practice of self-sufficient underwater diving without a "dive buddy", particularly with reference to scuba diving, but the term is also applied to freediving. Professionally, solo diving has always been an option which depends on operational requirements and risk assessment. Surface supplied diving and atmospheric suit diving are commonly single diver underwater activities but are accompanied by an on-surface support team dedicated to the safety of the diver, including a stand-by diver, and are not considered solo diving in this sense.

Solo freediving has occurred for millennia as evidenced by artifacts dating back to the ancient people of Mesopotamia when people dived to gather food and to collect pearl oysters. It wasn't until the 1950s, with the development of formalised scuba diving training, that recreational solo diving was deemed to be dangerous, particularly for beginners. In an effort to mitigate associated risks, some scuba certification agencies incorporated the practice of buddy diving into their diver training programmes. The true risk of solo diving relative to buddy diving in the same environmental conditions has never been reliably established, and may have been significantly overstated by some organisations, though it is generally recognised that buddy and team diving, when performed as specified in the manuals, will enhance safety to some extent depending on circumstances.

Some divers, typically those with advanced underwater skills, prefer solo diving over buddy diving and acknowledge responsibility for their own safety. One of the more controversial reasons given being the uncertain competence of arbitrarily allocated dive buddies imposed on divers by service providers protected from liability by waivers. Others simply prefer solitude while communing with nature, or find the burden of continuously monitoring another person reduces their enjoyment of the activity, or engage in activities which are incompatible with effective buddy diving practices, and accept the possibility of slightly increased risk, just as others accept the increased risk associated with deeper dives, planned decompression, or penetration under an overhead.

The recreational solo diver uses enhanced procedures, skills and equipment to mitigate the risks associated with not having another competent diver immediately available to assist if something goes wrong. The skills and procedures may be learned through a variety of effective methods to achieve appropriate competence, including formal training programmes with associated assessment and certification. Recreational solo diving, once discouraged by most training agencies, has been accepted since the late 1990s by some agencies that will train and certify experienced divers skilled in self-sufficiency and the use of redundant backup scuba equipment. In most countries there is no legal impediment to solo recreational diving, with or without certification.

== Definition ==
Solo diving is defined as diving planned to be conducted entirely or partly without a buddy. The term may also be applied to dives that begin with a buddy but continue after separation, and to dives where other divers are nearby but are either not responsible for the safety of the solo diver, or known not to be competent to deal with the consequences of a foreseeable contingency. The term has also been used to describe dives where buddies are insufficiently attentive or close enough to function effectively as a buddy pair, a situation commonly referred to as "same ocean buddy diving". The term is not used for diving where at least one of the buddies consistently strives to remain together and assist the other in an emergency, but fails in one or both of these goals, or dives where a buddy pair is split by a developing emergency which they are unable to manage.

=== Self-sufficiency ===
To be acceptably safe, solo divers must be self-sufficient, well trained, prepared, practiced and prudent. They should have a completely redundant set of all life support equipment – a complete, self-contained backup breathing gas supply sufficient to return to the surface from any point of the planned dive profile. In addition, responsible solo divers adhere to a relatively conservative dive profile, both in depth and level of difficulty. Unlike the buddy system, which can encourage divers to rely on others in the event of an emergency, solo diving encourages divers to prepare themselves to overcome emergencies by their own efforts. The divers who engage in solo diving are typically those who are experienced, equipped and skilled enough to handle problems themselves. Solo divers must feel comfortable and relaxed in doing this sort of diving, and nobody should seriously consider diving solo if they are not both competent and comfortable in doing so.

== History ==
The history of solo diving stands in stark contrast to the relatively new concept of buddy diving that was developed for recreational diving in the early to mid-20th century. Artifacts dating back some 4,500 years provide evidence of solo diving for food and commerce by the ancient people of Mesopotamia. There are written accounts from the 2nd century BC that describe commercial sponge fishing, including notes about sponge divers, their lifestyle and fear of predatory sharks. In 350 BC, Aristotle wrote about "an 'elephant nose-like tube' that allowed sponge fishermen to breathe during diving", and in 8th–6th century BC, there are references to solo diving in the writings of Homer.

Freedivers traditionally dived alone or with an attendant on the surface to assist with the harvest, and many of the early diving bells were only large enough for a single occupant. When surface supplied diving was first developed, it was common to have only one diver unless the work required more. Those early traditions continue and customarily include a standby diver, and a working diver who is in constant communication with the surface control crew. The sport of scuba diving is rooted in a multitude of small enthusiastic snorkelling and spearfishing clubs that date back to the decades just before and after World War II. In the late 1940s, after the invention of the Aqua-lung by Cousteau and Gagnan, the first retail underwater breathing apparatus for sport was commercially marketed. As the sport expanded through the 1950s, several sporting organisations – notably the Young Men's Christian Association (YMCA) – began scuba training programmes for swimming enthusiasts, thus began the codification of what was believed to be proper practices for the expanding amateur sport of scuba diving. The buddy system was thought to be a useful corollary to the "never swim alone" edicts of the YMCA swimming and lifesaving programmes. Cousteau independently implemented a buddy system after a number of harrowing diving incidents that date back to the earliest days of exploratory scuba diving. The buddy system's useful aspects have long been established, including the cross-checking of equipment before dives, the facilitating of assistance for possible entanglement problems or equipment failures, and enhancement of the social nature of diving. The YMCA was a substantial influence in the development of diver certification during the first 50 years of the sport. As various scuba programmes were adopted by emerging scuba certification agencies, such as the National Association of Underwater Instructors (NAUI), Professional Association of Diving Instructors (PADI), and British Sub-Aqua Club (BSAC), the practise of buddy diving inspired one of the two main mantras of recreational scuba: "never hold your breath" and "never dive alone".

By the early to mid-1990s, solo divers became more visible and increasingly open about their alternative dive safety philosophy, despite the recreational industry's established adherence to the buddy system. It wasn't until 2001 that Scuba Diving International (SDI) initiated formal certification training specifically for solo diving. Several other agencies eventually followed suit with certificates titled Self-reliant Diver and variations of that theme; all with the intention of improving diver competence without necessarily going solo, and recognising that the buddy system does not always comply with the ideal. At the 2012 "Rebreather Forum 3", a significant minority of attendees were of the opinion that, in some circumstances, it would be acceptable to dive solo on rebreathers.

== Reasons for solo scuba diving ==
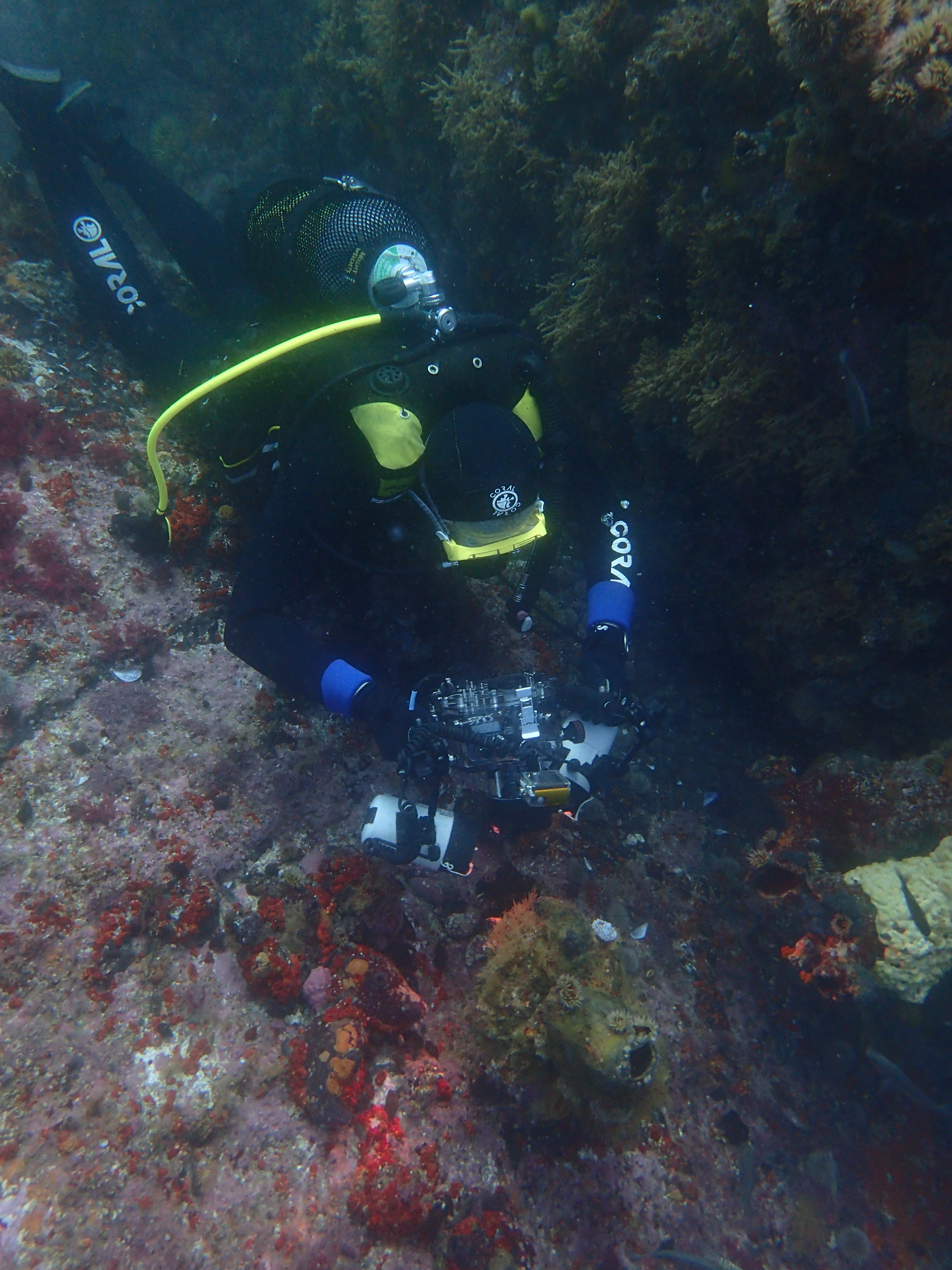
An underwater photographer intent on the composition of his next photograph

The intention of using the buddy system when scuba diving is to improve the chances of avoiding or surviving accidents in or underwater. Diving together in close groups of two or sometimes three divers, and co-operating with each other to help or perform a rescue in an emergency situation may save a life; however, it is most effective when each buddy is competent in all the relevant skills and remains consistently and sufficiently aware in order to respond in time.

Some divers, such as instructors, are effectively acting as self-sufficient divers because they dive with students who may not yet be trained in or capable of rescue. Others, such as underwater photographers and videographers, dive solo as it allows them to focus more on capturing selected images rather than relying on buddies to remain close at hand. Photographers or videographers who dive with buddies are often effectively "same ocean" buddies, implying they may be far enough apart physically, or sufficiently focused on their camera-related tasks, to be ineffective as a designated dive buddy. This practice has led to many highly experienced underwater photographers diving solo since they don't commit to provide timely support to a buddy nor expect such support from a buddy. Underwater hunters often elect to dive solo in order to focus on their prey.

Solo diving was considered technical diving by most recreational diver certification agencies and discouraged as more dangerous than buddy diving, but many experienced divers and some certification agencies consider it an acceptable practice for suitably trained, equipped, and competent recreational divers; some others consider it occasionally inevitable. In place of relying on the buddy diving safety system, solo divers try to be self-sufficient and are willing to take responsibility for their own safety while diving. The first training agency to offer a Solo diver certification was SDI in 1999. In 2011, the Professional Association of Diving Instructors (PADI) started offering a solo specialty called "Self-Reliant Diver", which in many respects (entry requirements, for example) is very similar to the course offered by SDI.

In professional diving, solo diving is normal procedure when one diver is sufficient to perform the required task, particularly on surface supplied equipment, to the extent that it is not even noted as an exception. However, a standby diver is required at the surface or at the bell, the working diver must be in communication with the supervisor at the surface, and the diver's airway is relatively secure in a helmet or full-face mask. Procedures for the dive are based on assessed risk.

In recreational diving, solo diving is an option chosen by the diver, for any combination of several reasons.

- Solo divers don't need to work around a buddy's diving schedule, and can dive when no trusted and familiar buddy is available.
- Some divers will dive in a buddy pair if diving with a known and trusted buddy but otherwise dive solo in preference to being paired up with a potentially unreliable, incompetent, or otherwise dangerous partner. In the United States, the added risk of becoming a respondent in litigation in the event of a diving accident with such a "dangerous buddy" can be a motivation to dive alone.
- The diver may simply prefer to dive alone. Diving professionals Wes Skiles and Ken Loyst, among others, take pleasure in the solitude of solo diving and in the feeling of self-sufficiency for this style of diving, that one is not dependent on others, but is relying solely on one's own skills and capabilities. Other experienced professionals, including Bret Gilliam and Darren Webb, enjoy the sense of freedom, of not being impeded by the need to look after anyone but oneself and therefore being able to achieve one's own goal in the dive without compromising.
- There are divers who enjoy specific underwater activities but are unable to find anyone who shares the specific interest sufficiently to dive with them, and where the activity is incompatible with a less than dedicated buddy. The option of simply not diving is not a practical solution, as the diver is then almost permanently prevented from pursuing the interest. Diving with buddies who get bored or tired quickly also does not lead to enhanced enjoyment for either party. When the underwater activity is of interest only to one person, diving solo is the only option that allows the activity to be undertaken.
- When photographing or shooting video of shy animals which are easily disturbed, it is more likely to be successful if there is only one diver potentially disturbing the subjects. The disturbance can also be reduced by buddy diving on rebreathers, which cuts down on bubble noise, but at the cost of increased risk due to the inherently higher number of failure modes characteristic of rebreathers. It is not clear which system has the lower overall risk.
- Most scuba depth records are set by solo divers. There is usually a substantial backup team on site and standing by, but for the record breaking part of the dive, the diver is almost always alone, and beyond the reasonable expectation of rescue.

== Comparison to alternative systems ==
Scuba diving is done in a hostile environment for which humans are not adapted, breathing from a portable and limited capacity life support system. Under these conditions fatality is always a possible outcome, as even simple equipment or procedural problems can be mishandled. In dealing with this reality a number of major concerns about potentially inherent flaws or negative impacts that can exist within the buddy system have been identified. Few, if any, of these problems are defects in the concept of the buddy system, they are problems with the application of the system.

=== Arguments in favour of solo diving ===
The amount of discipline, effort and attention needed from both divers in a buddy pair, and the even greater input required in a three diver team, is unattractive to a confident diver who has other things to do during a straightforward, low risk, recreational dive, and the system is undermined when any one of the divers fails to put in the effort, putting the burden on the remaining diver who takes the responsibilities more seriously. Familiarity with the environment, and the very low incidence of life-threatening accidents is likely to lead to a confidence that there will not be a problem on any given dive, so the divers may pay less attention to good buddy practices, and this may become habitual. This may be exacerbated by the divers being strangers thrown together by chance and the whims of the divemaster, who have no real interest in each other, and whose reasons to dive may be incompatible. Pairing an explorer with a macro photographer will annoy at least one, probably both, if they comply with recommended buddy diving practices. Many nominally buddy dives effectively become solo dives soon after entering the water, with the buddies occasionally checking for the presence of each other and often being beyond direct view of each other. In spite of this, very few of these divers die as a consequence.

Critics of the buddy system state that the proponents project the image of a "totally reliable buddy" that does not generally exist in reality. Some buddies lack skills or experience and some are unfit, and some personality types are outright dangers; these types have been described as "the untrained diver", "the high-flyer", "the falsely confident diver", "the angry diver", "the buddy from hell" and several others. The bad buddy problem is compounded by training that pressurises the diver to "stick with his buddy" at all times, leading to the situation that the bad buddy sets the criteria of how (badly) the dive is carried out. The solo diver avoids this problem altogether.

=== Advantages of buddy and team diving ===
There are disadvantages to solo diving that are not seriously disputed. Many of them occur in comparison with buddy diving when it is done according to the theoretically accepted standards, not necessarily when those standards are observed in name alone. In recreational scuba diving, the presence of a competent and attentive buddy can provide advantages to a diver who experiences any of a range of incidents which may be difficult or impossible to manage alone. These are all advantages to the diver in trouble, and at best, inconveniences to the buddy, as assisting another diver almost always increases risk to the rescuer.

Situations where a competent buddy can make a real difference include:

- Some types of medical emergency involving a reduced state of consciousness or major disorientation
- Situations where excessive exertion or a medical condition reduces the diver's capacity to cope.
- Some types of entrapment, particularly entanglement where the diver cannot see or reach the point of attachment to the snag
- Emergencies where the backup equipment also fails.
- Situations where the diver is physically or psychologically unable to cope alone.

Teamwork may also simplify and facilitate tasks and save time in specific circumstances such as penetration diving in caves and wrecks.

== Risks and their mitigation ==
The generic risks of recreational scuba diving include:

- running out of breathing gas
- equipment failure and inappropriate response
- loss of buoyancy control causing uncontrolled rapid ascent or inability to ascend
- unawareness of decompression status, causing missed decompression.
- inability to return to the surface – getting lost under an overhead, or physically trapped
- overestimating ability to successfully complete a dive – including environmental, physical fitness and medical concerns.
- medical emergencies in a hostile environment.

These risks can be reduced and the consequences mitigated by correct application of knowledge, skills, fitness and equipment. Where a single point of failure is likely to seriously compromise safety, redundant equipment can be carried, and the skills learned to effectively use the equipment without undue delay.

There has been much disagreement over the relative safety and merits of solo diving. Up to 2003, very few statistics existed regarding the impact of solo diving on safety, as the subject had not been specifically studied. A 2006 report from the British Sub-Aqua Club (BSAC) concluded that "BSAC currently takes the view that based on evidence from available statistics and risk assessment, the increased risk attendant to allowing planned solo diving is unacceptable". The data underlying the statistics which are used to point to the dangers of solo diving are questionable: for example, divers who end up dying alone but originally had started out as part of a buddy pair are often considered to be "diving solo" in such statistics, but whether the separation was a consequence of the triggering incident rather than a cause is not analyzed.

Studies have shown that with fatal buddy diving incidents, 57% of deaths happened after the buddy pair had separated from one another during the emergency. These cases could be attributed to failure of the buddy system rather than failure of any solo diving or self-sufficient diving system. A further complication in such statistics is that certain more dangerous diving activities such as cave diving, are frequently carried out solo, and, it is questionable whether a death in these circumstances should be attributed to solo diving, or to cave diving, or to a combination of these factors. Analysis of the figures used by BSAC to categorise solo diving as dangerous shows that during 2001–2008 all but one of these "solo diving deaths" were actually paired buddy divers who became separated during or before the fatal incident (75%), or else were divers diving far outside of the limits set by both SDI and PADI for the practice of solo diving (20%) (i.e. deep dives, rebreather dives, and/or cave dives, as well as being solo dives). Two further "solo-diving deaths" were not scuba divers at all, but snorkellers.

In almost all circumstances, two highly competent, totally self-sufficient divers diving a specific dive profile as a buddy pair are at lower risk than those same two divers diving exactly the same profile separately, but this raises the questions "how often do normal buddy divers both really fit into this particular description", "How much additional risk is incurred", and "Which option gives the diver the most advantage overall, considering both risk and reward"? When considering the risks in solo diving the alternative risks found predominantly in buddy diving should also be considered. The greatest risk factor in recreational diving is inexperience – 60% of all diving fatalities involve divers having less than 20 completed dives. The buddy system itself can be a source of risk – a 2006 survey showed that 52% of buddy divers were at some time actually endangered by a buddy's behavior or actions.

As part of mitigating risks in solo diving the following specific practices have been adopted by SDI for solo diving or are key recommendations by Robert von Maier—author of the 1991 book Solo Diving: The Art of Underwater Self-Sufficiency:

- All solo diving is to be done within recreational dive limits (no deep, decompression, penetration, or rebreather dives while solo).
- No dives which significantly exceed one's personal experience limits are to be undertaken while solo
- No solo dives are to be undertaken in areas where there are known hazards of entanglement/entrapment
- Solo dives will only be undertaken to depths at which the bailout system used carries an acceptable level of risk, the appropriate equipment is carried, and where the relevant bailout procedures have been practiced successfully by the diver.
- The solo diver's maximum distance to point of exit (shore, boat) will never exceed a distance that can be easily and comfortably swum at the surface in full scuba gear – and the diver will maintain and exercise his/her navigational practices in solo dives to ensure that this is the case.

A solo diver needs to be particularly aware of overall personal fitness and health and the limitations it may impose on their ability to manage an emergency. Finally, the solo diver may plan a more conservative dive than they might dive with an equally competent buddy diver.

=== Equipment ===
While there are hazards specifically associated with solo diving, most of these can be planned for and their consequences mitigated by the use of appropriate equipment. In technical diving, where redundancy of critical equipment is standard policy, self-sufficiency is emphasised and taught more extensively than in most recreational diving. This philosophy should also be followed by solo divers. Additional equipment carried may include a bailout gas supply, a backup dive computer, a backup dive light and a backup dive mask. The diver must be familiar with the equipment configuration used and be able to access the equipment easily if it is needed.

A solo diver operating beyond the range for acceptable risk for a controlled emergency swimming ascent needs to carry a second, independent source of suitable breathing gas, which includes a regulator and preferably a submersible pressure gauge. This emergency gas supply typically takes the form of a bailout cylinder, or a twin tank set with the capability of independent operation of each tank. Most of the equipment needed for solo diving is the same as that which would be used for buddy diving the same dive profile at the same place. The single most important item of additional equipment required is the redundant breathing gas supply, which must be sufficient to get the diver safely to the surface from any point of the planned dive. There is more than one way to achieve this, and they each have their advantages and disadvantages.

- Isolation-manifolded twin cylinders. The standard technical diving back mount configuration allows access to all the gas through either regulator, but the valves may be difficult to reach for the less supple diver, and it must be possible to reach the isolation valve to shut it off in case of a catastrophic leak. It is heavy and bulky, and requires a suitable harness and BCD.
- Back mounted Independent twin cylinders are also heavy and bulky, and require a suitable harness and BCD. Enough gas to surface safely must be left in each cylinder at all times.
- Sidemount with two cylinders. This arrangement is standard for sidemount diving. It requires a suitable harness and BCD. Enough gas to surface safely must be left in each cylinder at all times.
- Single back mounted primary cylinder with a cylinder mounted pony bailout set. This is convenient when in the water and keeps the bailout set out of the way, but makes the scuba set heavier than a single when out of the water, and may need trim weights for lateral balance. Accessibility of the pony cylinder valve must be appropriate. Enough gas to surface safely must be left in each cylinder until the ascent is started.
- Single back mounted primary cylinder with side-slung bailout set. Reasonably convenient, easily accessible demand valve, pressure gauge and valve knob, but the bailout can get in the way a bit and mounting the cylinder takes a bit of practice. The arrangement is very portable between dives, as the same bailout set can be used for a large number of dives without any modification, adjustment, or need to refill. Trim weight may be needed for lateral balance. Size can be whatever is available - as long as it is sufficient and is not too heavy. Even an aluminium 80 can be comfortably carried this way by a moderately large diver. An aluminium 40 is enough for almost any recreational dive, and is one of the more popular options for acceptable bulk and buoyancy, and remains useful for most recreational dive profiles even when partly used.
- Harness mounted "spare air" type miniature bailout set. These are light and compact but carry a very limited gas supply and are only suitable for fairly shallow dives. An advantage is that they can easily be refilled from a primary gas cylinder on site.

Other more complex arrangements of three or more cylinders are possible, but not usually of any advantage for recreational solo diving. Arrangements using H- and Y-valved back gas cylinders with two first stages may be useful if there is a significant risk of regulator freezing, but do not provide full redundancy. For solo diving an octopus regulator is not needed, as it is intended for supplying gas to another diver, though some consider a secondary regulator on the primary gas supply valuable as a backup in case of primary regulator malfunction.

An alternative ascent system may be required (as in Queensland, Australia), and is a useful safety adjunct in many situations both in solo and buddy diving, where better control of ascent rate is desirable. In Queensland law it is defined as "A highly visible buoyancy device such as a delayed surface marker buoy that provides a submerged diver with an ascent line that the diver may follow to the surface and use to complete any decompression requirements."

== Training ==
The core objective in training to be a solo diver is to become as self-sufficient and self-reliant as possible, to be able to deal with any reasonably foreseeable problems without assistance, and to have the competence, fitness, discipline, skills and equipment that will achieve this result. This requires competence at risk-assessment and the ability to plan dives and select equipment that limit the risks. An additional benefit of these disciplines is that they will improve the safety of buddy diving whenever the competent solo diver pairs up with another diver in a buddy team by reducing the risk of the second diver being exposed to an emergency which they may not be capable of managing. Agencies training solo divers also recommend the self-sufficiency training in their courses for all divers as their diving experience grows, so as to achieve greater safety in all diving – buddy and solo.

Solo divers are taught to extend their experience gradually, and to ensure that they remain within their personal comfort zone where possible. This reduces the risk of excessive task loading and possible panic reaction to an otherwise manageable contingency. This is not unique to solo diver training, it is a common training practice for any hazardous activity, but when exposing oneself to circumstances where there is no backup it is more important. This means that changes to environment, depth, or equipment are best made one at a time, and in reasonably small steps, so that the diver can become familiar with one small change in circumstances before adding another. Simulating emergencies for practice and ensuring that one's response is prompt, appropriate and effective will reduce the risk of inappropriate response if the real emergency occurs.

Formal solo diving training as provided by SDI emphasises the need for experience and maturity in diving. In particular the student prerequisites for the solo diving certification course are:

- a minimum age of 21 years
- a minimum certification of SDI Advanced Diver (or equivalent)
- proof of a minimum of 100 logged open-water dives
- depending on the country – a certificate of medical fitness to dive.

Another item which is very useful for the solo diver is the delayed surface marker buoy (DSMB) with a reel or spool suited to the depth of the planned dive. The primary function is to mark the position of the ascending diver, but it can also be used to control ascent rate, and to mitigate buoyancy loss malfunctions. A secondary use is to control ascent rate in case of a positive buoyancy event due to loss of ballast weights.

=== Self-reliance skills ===
Besides competence in the standard set of scuba skills, there are a few more advanced self-reliance and self-rescue skills required by some of the training agencies. The diver should be able to select and correctly use all equipment needed for the dive, including self-extrication gear for cutting loose from entanglement. A solo diver needs to be able to prepare, dress in and check all equipment used without buddy assistance.

The diver must have an acceptable alternative breathing gas configuration, redundant gauges and/or computers, DSMB and reel, compass, and depending on the certification agency and training centre, signalling device and line cutting device. During the course tests are conducted on swimming skills and swimming endurance, scuba skills associated with solo diving such as the use of redundant air and bailout to emergency gas supply, navigation skills and dive planning skills, and breathing gas management.

The CMAS Self-Rescue Diver training includes the deployment of colour-coded DSMBs – red for position indication, and yellow to indicate a problem, the use of a ratchet dive reel to control ascent rate in the event of unplanned positive buoyancy due to loss of weights – the end of the line is fastened to a heavy object on the bottom, and deployed under tension to control depth, and the use of a backup mask.

=== Certifications in solo and self-reliant diving ===
Several diver certification organisations offer training and certification in solo and self reliant diving skills, in some cases tailored for a particular type of diving environment:

- CDG – (Cave Diving Group) – the UK organisation prepares divers for solo cave diving in sub-optimum conditions as part of their cave diving skills requirement.
- CMAS – (Confédération Mondiale des Activités Subaquatiques) – Self-Rescue Diver: prerequisite – Two star diver.
- DIWA – (Diving Instructor World Association) – Self-reliant diver: prerequisite – Advanced open-water diver.
- SDI – (Scuba Diving International) – Solo diver: prerequisite – SDI Advanced Diver or equivalent, 21 years of age, 100 logged dives.
- IANTD – (International Association of Nitrox and Technical Divers) – Self-sufficient diver: prerequisite – IANTD Deep Diver or equivalent.
- PADI – (Professional Association of Diving Instructors) – Self Reliant Diver: prerequisites: Advanced Open Water Diver, at least 18 years old and 100 logged dives.
- ProTec – (Professional Technical and Recreational Diving) – Self Reliant Diver and Solo Diver: Prerequisites for both: 1* Diver, at least 18 years old, 100 logged dives, having "good diving fitness" (not defined).
- RAID – (Rebreather Association of International Divers) – Independent Diver: A recreational program for no-decompression open-circuit diving. Prerequisites: certified diver with at least 50 hours or 100 logged dives.
- SSI – (Scuba Schools International) – Independent Diving: prerequisites: Night & Limited Visibility, Navigation, Deep Diving and Stress & Rescue Certification.

== Legal status ==
In most countries there is no government regulation of recreational diving and solo diving is at the discretion of the diver in publicly accessible waters. There are some exceptions:

- In the Republic of Maldives, recreational solo diving is illegal under any circumstances, as is recreational diving to depths greater than 30 m and any recreational diving which requires decompression stops.
- In Israel, a person may not take part in a recreational scuba dive unless accompanied by at least one other qualified diver.
- In Queensland, Australia, solo diving is specifically recognised and provided for in the state legislation under the Recreational Diving, Recreational Technical Diving and Snorkelling Code of Practice, 2024 (previously 2011), for qualified and appropriately equipped divers.

== See also ==
- Buddy check – Pre-dive safety checks carried out by two-diver dive teams
- Buddy diving – Practice of mutual monitoring and assistance between two divers
- Dive leader – Recreational diving certification and role
- Dive planning – Process of planning an underwater diving operation
- Diving procedures – Standard underwater diving protocols
- Diving safety – Risk management of underwater diving activities
- Rescue Diver – Recreational scuba certification emphasising emergency response and diver rescue
- Scuba skills – Skills required to scuba-dive safely
