= Master Diver =

Master Diver usually refers to an experienced person in underwater diving or scuba diving. In more formal settings, this may refer to someone who has completed a qualification program to receive the designation.

== United States military ==
- Master diver (United States Navy)
- United States Army Master Diver, a qualification of United States Army engineer diver

== Recreational diving ==
- Master Scuba Diver, a non-professional certification
- Divemaster, a professional certification
