= Professional Technical and Recreational Diving =

Diver certification agency

Professional Technical and Recreational Diving (ProTec) is an international diver certification agency based in Munich, Germany.

ProTec was founded in 1997. ProTec offers diving education standards and training procedures for beginners through to advanced and diving professionals. These standards and procedures are used by diving instructors to conduct diver training courses. ProTec is accredited with authorities in Spain, Egypt and with the German DIN-EN-ISO Institute for the ProTec diver ISO levels and the ProTec instructor ISO ranks.

== Training and certification system ==
Dive training at ProTec consists of theoretical and practical units as with most other diving agencies. There is a division into 2 main areas: Freediving and Scuba diving. The scuba certifications are divided into recreational diving and technical diving, where recreational is further subdivided into introduction and core and specialties. Technical certifications are categorised similarly.

Unlike other agencies, ProTec has two systems of certification for a few main levels. The certifications Open Water Diver (OWD), Advanced Open Water Diver (AOWD) and Divemaster (DM) based on RSTC standards, and the European certification system according to CMAS guidelines (1,2,3 - star system).

=== Recreational scuba introduction and core competences ===
- Intro Scuba – an Introduction to Scuba Diving according to ISO 11121. At ProTec this is a preliminary step to the beginner certifications.
- Basic Scuba Diver - supervised diver (ISO 24801-1), entry level certification,
- Junior OWD - supervised diver (ISO 24801-1), simplified open water diver certification for children aged 10 years and over.
- OWD - autonomous diver (ISO 24801-2), open water diver certification,
- 1* Diver - autonomous diver (ISO 24801-2), according to CMAS 1 STAR program,
- AOWD - advanced open water diver certification,
- 2** Diver - according to CMAS 2 STAR program,
- Master Diver
- 3** Diver - according to CMAS 3 STAR program
- Dive Master - (ISO 24801-3), Divemaster, dive guide
- Dive Supervisor – from professional dive guide to dive director, non-teaching
- Assistant Instructor - (ISO 24802-1)
- Prime Scuba Instructor - (ISO 24802-2)
- Speciality or Technical Instructor according to speciality or technical diving course
- Master Scuba Instructor
- Assistant Instructor Trainer
- Instructor Trainer
- IC Inspector

=== Recreational scuba specialties ===
- Night Diver
- Advanced Navigation
- Search & Recovery
- MFA - Medical First Aid (non-diving course)
- O2P - Oxygen Provider (non-diving course)
- AED - Automated External Defibrillator (non-diving course)
- Rescue – MFA and O2P are included among the prerequisites, AED is an option
- Equipment Maintenance
- Nitrox 1 – diving with standard Nitrox mixtures 28-32-36-till 40% O2 (ISO 11107)
- Current / Drift
- Altitude diving
- Cavern - moderate (overhead environment)
- Wreck - recreational wreck diving means little to moderate overhead environment
- Ice - moderate overhead environment)
- Dry suit
- Deep – maximum depth is 40 m, no decompression dives
- Boat - how to dive from a boat (safe exit and entry procedures)
- Scooter – UW DPV
- UW Photo / Video
- Self Reliant / Solo
- Green Diver Program (various courses on how to protect the marine environment and dive without harming it)

=== Technical diving ===
- Nitrox 2 – Advanced Nitrox
- Gas Blender 1 – (ISO 13293) covers Nitrox,
- Gas Blender 2 – (ISO 13293) covers Nitrox and Trimix,
- Intro Trimix – Trimix 1, max. 45m, Normoxic TRX
- Normoxic Trimix – Trimix 2, max. 60m, Normoxic TRX
- Advanced Trimix – Trimix 3, max. 90m
- Advanced Deep – max. 45m on air or nitrox
- Extended Range - maximum 55m on air or nitrox
- Intro Wreck – technical wreck level 1 (max. 40m/130ft, 1/3 single tank rule, one main guideline, no restrictions)
- TEC Wreck – technical wreck level 2 (2 indep./double cylinder - 1/3 rule - plus stage/deco cyl, jump/gab reel use, moderate restrictions)
- Advanced Wreck – technical wreck level 3
- Intro Cave – technical cave level 1 (max. 40m/130ft, 1/3 single tank rule, one main guideline, no restrictions)
- Full Cave – technical cave level 2,
- Advanced Cave – technical cave level 3,
- Rebreather – with depth levels from 40m to 100m per class/type (manual/electronic/hybrid)

=== Freediving ===
- Discover Snorkel Diving, Introduction ABC
- Skin Diver
- Apnea 1
- Apnea 2
- Apnea 3
