= Supervised diver =

Class of recreational scuba diver

Supervised diver specifies the training and certification for recreational scuba divers in international standard ISO 24801-1 and the equivalent European Standard EN 14153-1. Various diving organizations offer diving training that meets the requirements of the Supervised Diver. A diving certification which corresponds to the Supervised Diver allows for recreational diving under the direct supervision of a divemaster or recreational diving instructor in open water. Most diving organizations recommend not to exceed a diving depth of 10 to 12 metres. After the successful completion of a training equivalent to the Supervised diver, training can be extended to the Autonomous diver certification level (according to ISO 24801-2).

Scuba diving education levels as used by ISO, PADI, CMAS, SSI and NAUI

Before initial diver training and thereafter at regular intervals, a diver should undergo a fitness to dive examination by a diving doctor. In some countries, such an examination is required by law and is a prerequisite for any training in many diving schools.

In some parts of the world there is minimum requirement which corresponds to the Autonomous Diver certification and an in-date medical certificate for hiring diving equipment and taking part in recreational diving. In these places a certificate which only corresponds to the Supervised Diver is regarded as insufficient.

== Scope of the standard ==
International standard ISO 24801-1 includes:

- Prerequisites for training, including age and health requirements, There is no minimum age specified in the ISO 24801-1 standard. Therefore, the decision here lies with the diving organizations. However, it can be assumed that the guidelines for diving with children apply. In the case of minors, the consent of the parents or legal guardian is required. The mental and physical requirements for scuba diving must first be met. As for the health requirements for diving, the standard requires a medical examination.
- Required theoretical knowledge regarding scuba and basic diving equipment, the basic physics of diving, medical problems related to diving, the diving environment, scuba diver separation procedure. The use of breathing gases other than air is not specifically prohibited, provided the associated limits are clear to the student.
- Required scuba skills in confined and open water,
- Practical training parameters,
- Evaluation of knowledge and practical skills. The theoretical and practical skills mentioned in the ISO 24801-1 standard are almost similar to those in the ISO 24801-2 standard in some areas, but the competencies of the divers are quite different. This is because the ISO standard contains only a rough description of the theory and practice points. Therefore, the detailed interpretation of the points listed in the ISO standards is up to the diving agency and the instructor. A major difference between ISO 24801-1 and ISO 24801-2 is not only the maximum diving depth, but also that the supervised diver (ISO 24801-1) must always be guided by a professional guide, i.e., a dive master or an instructor, while ISO 24801-2 may dive together with equally experienced divers. The professional who guides supervised divers, takes control of the dive route. That is, dive time, dive depth and the actions to be taken in case of possible negative parameters such as current, visibility, but also the behavior of the divers and the group. The knowledge required for this is therefore not checked in ISO 24801-1 diver evaluation, or only in a rudimentary way. In the medical field, this mainly concerns nitrogen narcosis, decompression sickness and oxygen toxicity. In contrast, the topics of gas compression and gas expansion are very important for all scuba divers, even if the dive depth is only a few meters. Equipment handling in the Supervised Diver evaluation also focuses on the essentials such as BCD & buoyancy handling, regulator exercises, all in as simple a form as possible.

== Training according to ISO 24801-1 ==
Every year around 1.7 million people are trained according to ISO 24801. Despite the standardization, the dive courses of individual diving organizations differ considerably in their content, expansion and philosophy. However, the minimum requirements defined in the ISO standard guarantee that a diver can easily convert between training organizations.

The following certifications meet the requirements for Supervised Diver:

=== CMAS ===
Confédération Mondiale des Activités Subaquatiques (CMAS) itself does not offer any training which corresponds to the Supervised Diver, but the content, regulations and designations of the individual CMAS member organizations can vary considerably, and there are some CMAS affiliates (e.g. VDST or IAC) that offer such training and certification independently of CMAS. The certificate is usually called Basic Diver or something similar.

=== NAUI Passport Diver ===
The NAUI Passport Diver (PD) is not a diving certification, it is only an entry-level experience opportunity for interested amateurs to try out recreational diving. In this course, all the contents required by the standard for the Supervised Diver are taught. The Passport Diver training includes two guided dives in limited open water, with a previous theoretical introduction. The Passport Diver experience does not include certification, but can be counted towards a NAUI Scuba Diver course (SD) within six months. The Passport Diver experience does not require prior experience of diving, but normal physical health and fitness are required. Persons who wish to participate in a Passport Diver offer must be at least 12 years old, but a NAUI Junior Passport Diver can be done at the age of eight. The experience for children differs only by a child-oriented presentation of the same contents.

=== PADI Scuba Diver ===
Overview of the PADI training system

PADI Scuba Diver (SD) is a basic diver training course where a diver can learn all the content required in the ISO standard for a Supervised Diver. PADI allows SD divers to dive to a depth of 12 meters, accompanied by a PADI Divemaster or Instructor.

The PADI Scuba Diver course includes the first three lessons of the five-part Open Water Diver course (OWD). Due to the modular design, Open Water Diver training can be divided into two courses, of which the first is PADI Scuba Diver. The SD course includes three theory and three swimming pool lessons, and at least two dives in open water with the scuba. PADI follows the "dive today" philosophy - after a theory lesson, dives usually take place on the same day. The pool dives - which can also take place in calm, current free, shallow open water, provide the training in the basic and emergency skills, including getting into the water, breathing under water using the regulator, use of fins, basic buoyancy control, mask clearing and regulator recovery. The same exercises are partly repeated in the open water dives.

PADI-SD training can be started without prior experience of diving. Normal physical health and fitness are required. Persons who wish to attend an SD course must be at least 15 years old, but a PADI Junior SD course (JSD) can be attended at the age of 10 years. The children's dive course differs only in a child-oriented mediation of the same contents.

=== SSI Scuba Diver ===
The SSI Scuba Diver (SD) is a basic diver certification equivalent to the Supervised Diver standard. The training shall include at least two open water dives, which may only be carried out after the successful completion of the theoretical training. SSI allows SD divers, accompanied by a dive guide or instructor, to dive to a maximum depth of 12 meters. After successful completion, training can be continued with Open Water Diver Training (OWD). The SSI SD course does not require previous experience of diving. Normal physical health and fitness are required and an SSI Medical Statement is issued. The learner must be able to swim 180 meters without an aid. Persons who wish to attend an SD course must be at least 15 years old, but SSI Junior SD training can be done at the age of 10 years. The children's dive course differs only in a child-oriented mediation of the same contents.

=== Other training agencies ===
Some diving organizations dispense with a training level corresponding to the Supervised Diver and define the contents of the Autonomous Diver according to (ISO 24801-2) as the lowest level of training and breeding. In addition to the above, the following training corresponds to the Supervised Diver according to ISO 24801-1:

Diver certification agency		Training and certification	
Disabled Divers International	DDI	Supervised Diver	SD
International Association for Handicapped Divers	IAHD	Tourist Diver	TD
International Scuba Diving Academy	ISDA	Scuba Diver	SD
National Academy of Scuba Educators	NASE	Scuba Diver	SD
National Diving League	NDL	Novice Diver	ND
Verband Deutscher Tauchlehrer	VDTL	Basic Diver	
Worldwide Academy of Scuba Educators	WASE	Scuba Diver	SD
World Organisation of Scuba Diving	WOSD	Supervised Diver	SD
Professional Technical and Recreational Diving	ProTec	Basic Scuba Diver	SD
International Scuba Certiification	ISC	Scuba Diver	SD
