= Pro shop =

Sporting-goods shop within a sporting facility

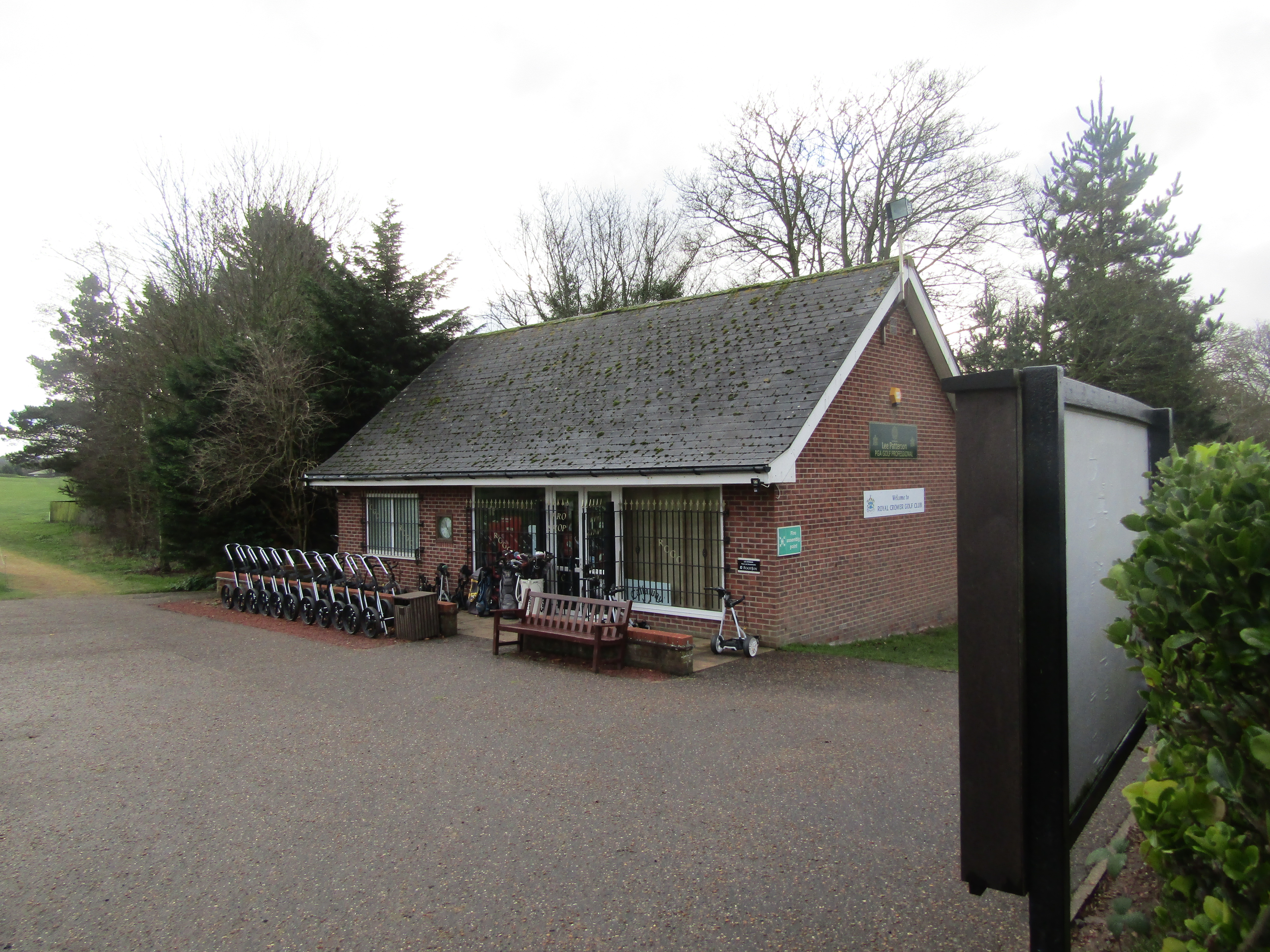
The pro club golf shop of Cromer Royal golf course located in the town of Cromer, Norfolk, England.

A pro shop is a sporting-goods retail outlet found at a sports facility, most commonly a golf course, where it is typically located in the country club building. Examples of businesses that might have a Pro shops are bowling alleys, pool and snooker halls, tennis and racquetball courts, race tracks, ice and roller hockey rinks, and football (soccer) facilities.

Pro shops specialize in selling sports equipment and branded items particular to the sport or venue. Pro shops at golf facilities usually provide equipment such as golf balls, clubs, shoes, and tees, as well as golf-themed gift items, and sometimes snacks or refreshments. Pro shops will usually have items on display to test and evaluate before purchase.

Pro shops are often managed by a professional player referred to as a house pro, and overseen by a general manager who is employed by or acts as a consultant contractor. Shops may also be run by a retail manager at larger venues (or those too small to attract a pro). House pros are often available to advise on game-related issues such as rules, and the proper equipment for particular needs and conditions; and sometimes for instruction, including group lessons and one-on-one training (usually for a fee). They also sometimes perform paid personal equipment maintenance, such as restringing tennis racquets, drilling and fitting bowling balls, re-tipping pool/snooker cues, and skate sharpening.

== Alternative retail outlets ==
Some American football teams, such as the Green Bay Packers, Philadelphia Eagles and New England Patriots, offer team merchandise and replica apparel for purchase through team stores branded as "pro shops", either at a store at the team's stadium, shops in other venues such as shopping malls, and online.

== See also ==
- Dive center, which fulfills pro shop functions for underwater diving
