= Autonomous diver =

International minimum standard for entry level recreational scuba diver certification

Autonomous diver is an international minimum standard for entry-level recreational scuba diver certification. It describes the minimum requirements for basic training and certification for recreational scuba divers in international standard ISO 24801-2 and the equivalent European Standard EN 14153-2. Various organizations offer training that meets the requirements of the Autonomous Diver standard. A certification which corresponds to Autonomous Diver allows for independent diving with a dive buddy in open water. Most training organizations do not recommend exceeding a depth of 18 or 20 meters at this level of certification. After completion of this certification, the training can be extended to a dive leader to ISO 24801-3 or an intermediate not defined by international standards.

Scuba diving education levels as used by ISO, PADI, CMAS, SSI and NAUI

Before initial diver training and thereafter at regular intervals, a diver should undergo a fitness to dive examination by a diving doctor. In some countries, such an examination is required by law and it is a prerequisite for any training in many diving schools. A diving certification which corresponds to Autonomous Diver and a medical certificate may be required for renting diving equipment and taking part in organised dives. In some countries (e.g. Australia) the law requires every diver to prove basic certification before unsupervised diving activity.

Some diver training organizations offer an intermediate Supervised diver certification which corresponds to ISO 24801-1, which usually only splits the contents of the Autonomous Diver training over two courses and does not qualify the holder to take part in independent dives.

== Scope of the standard ==
International standard ISO 24801-2 includes:

- Prerequisites for training, including age and health requirements,
- Required theoretical knowledge regarding scuba and basic diving equipment, the basic physics of diving, decompression management and dive planning, medical and psychological problems related to diving, the diving environment and the use of nitrox breathing gases,
- Required scuba skills in confined and open water,
- Practical training parameters,
- Evaluation of knowledge and practical skills.

== Training according to ISO 24801-2 ==
Every year around 1.7 million people are trained according to ISO 24801. Despite the standardization, the dive courses of individual diving organizations differ considerably in their content, expansion and philosophy. However, the minimum requirements defined in the ISO standard guarantee that a diver can easily convert between training organizations.

The following certifications meet the requirements for Autonomous Diver:

=== CMAS * ===
The CMAS certification system

The CMAS * (one-star) training goes beyond the requirements defined by the Autonomous Diver standard. CMAS requires the theory test before diving in open water. 6 theory lessons, which build the basic understanding of the learner diver and, after the successful completion of a theory test, at least 6 swimming pool or confined water training sessions, and 5 open water training and assessment dives. The course includes breathhold exercises. After successfully completing the course, training can continue with specialisation courses or the CMAS ** (two star). CMAS recommends maximum depth of 20 meters for one-star divers. For divers aged between 8 and 14 years, a maximum depth of 5 meters is recommended.

The CMAS * course can be started without prior knowledge of diving. Persons who wish to attend a CMAS * course must be at least 14 years old, and in normal physical health and fitness.

The basic training standards of the individual CMAS member organizations may differ from the training specified by CMAS.

=== NAUI Open Water Scuba Diver ===
The NAUI Open Water Scuba Diver course (OWSD) is a basic diving certification training which meets the requirements of the Autonomous Diver standard. The training includes 2 breath-hold and 4 scuba dives. NAUI allows student divers to dive to a maximum depth not exceeding 18 meters. After successful completion, the training can be continued with specialty certification or the Advanced Scuba Diver course. The NAUI OWSD course can be started without previous knowledge of diving. Normal physical health and fitness are required. Persons who wish to attend an SD course must be at least 15 years old. NAUI Junior Scuba Diver training can be attended at the age of 12 years. These children's diving courses differ only in a child-oriented mediation of the same contents.

=== PADI Open Water Diver ===
Overview of the PADI training system

The PADI Open Water Diver Course (OWD) is an entry-level diver training programme to the ISO standards for Autonomous Diver. PADI allows OWD divers to dive to a depth of 18 meters. After successful completion, training can be continued with specialties or the Advanced Open Water Diver course.

The course consists of five theory lessons, five swimming pool dives and at least four dives in open water on scuba. They also recommend an optional snorkeling dive and / or "adventure dive". PADI follows the concept of diving on the same day as attending the presentation. Therefore, after a theory lesson, the dives are usually held on the same day. The pool dives - which can also be done at calm, current-free, shallow places in open water, provide for learning the basic and emergency techniques. These include entering the water, breathing under water from the scuba regulator, using the fins, basic buoyancy control, clearing the mask, recovery of the demand valve and emergency ascent. In the open water dives, the same exercises are repeated in deeper water. There are also techniques for managing cramping, open water descent and ascent, buddy breathing and diver navigation.

OWD is an entry-level course. Normal physical health and fitness are required. Persons who wish to attend a PADI OWD course must be at least 15 years old, but a PADI Junior OWD course (JOWD) can be attended at the age of 10 years. These children's dive courses differ only in a child-oriented mediation of the same contents.

=== SSI Open Water Diver ===
Overview of the SSI training system

The Scuba Schools International (SSI) Open Water Diver Course (OWD) is a basic dive certification equivalent to the standard Autonomous Diver. The training includes at least 4 open water dives, which can only be carried out after the successful completion of the theoretical training. SSI allows OWD divers to dive to a maximum depth of 18 meters. After successful completion, training can be continued with specialties or the Advanced Adventurer Course. The SSI OWD is an entry-level course. Normal physical health and fitness are required and an SSI Medical Statement must be provided. The learner must be able to swim 180 meters without an aid. Persons who wish to attend an OWD course must be at least 15 years old. An SSI Junior OWD training can be completed at the age of 10 years. [11] These children's dive courses differ only in a child-oriented mediation of the same contents.

=== SDI Open Water Scuba Diver ===
The SDI (Scuba Diving International) Open Water Scuba Diver certification meets the requirements of the Autonomous Diver standard. This certification course is designed to give students the necessary skills to conduct open water dives in conditions similar to their training without the direct supervision of an instructor. Graduates are qualified to:

- Conduct open water dives in conditions similar to their training to a maximum depth of 18 metres/ 60 feet.
- Conduct dives with other certified divers at the same or higher level of certification.
- Conduct dives that do not require decompression stops.
- Enroll in the Advanced Adventure Diver program, individual SDI Specialties or the SDI Advanced Diver Development program.

The minimum age is 18; 10-17 with written parental consent.

=== Other training agencies ===
In addition to the above, the following certifications comply with the Autonomous Diver standard ISO 24801-2:

Diver training agency		Certification	
American Nitrox Divers International	ANDI	Open Sport Diver	OSD
British Sub-Aqua Club	BSAC	Ocean Diver	OD
Disabled Divers International	DDI	Autonomous Diver	AD
Global Underwater Explorers	GUE	Recreational Diver Level 1	Rec 1
International Association for Handicapped Divers	IAHD	One Star Diver	*
International Scuba Certification	ISC	Open Water Diver	OWD
International Scuba Diving Academy	ISDA	Open Water Diver	OWD
National Academy of Scuba Educators	NASE	Open Water Diver	OWD
National Diving League	NDL	Diver	
Professional Technical and Recreational Diving	ProTec	Open Water Diver	OWD
Verband Deutscher Tauchlehrer	VDTL	Bronze	
Worldwide Academy of Scuba Educators	WASE	Open Water Diver	OWD
World Organisation of Scuba Diving	WOSD	Autonomous Diver	AD
