= International Association for Handicapped Divers =

Non-profit organisation based in the Netherlands

- Abbreviation: IAHD
- Formation: 1993
- Type: Underwater diving training organization
- Headquarters: Middenmeer, Netherlands
- Parent organization: World Organisation of Scuba Diving (WOSD)
- Affiliations: European Underwater Federation
- Website: www.iahd.org

The International Association for Handicapped Divers (or "IAHD") is a non-profit organization with its headquarters in Middenmeer, the Netherlands. The organization was established in 1993, with the aim to promote, develop and conduct programs for the training in scuba diving of people with a disability. From 1993 to date (2008) IAHD have educated and certified over 5500 divers and dive professionals worldwide. As the IAHD is a non-profit foundation, all the people on the board are volunteers. There are also volunteers in regions around the world.

== Courses ==
The IAHD offers courses specifically designed for people with physical or (minor) mental disabilities, courses for already certified SCUBA diving instructors to give them the ability to teach the above-mentioned courses and also courses for people who intent assist people with physical or (minor) mental disabilities at the surface or dive with them. These courses are available as described below:

=== Diving courses ===
- Pirate Fish Diver - This program is developed for both children and adults with mental disabilities. Upon completion of the course, the certified Pirate Fish Diver is not a fully-fledged diver, but can proceed to the Open Water Diver or Confined Water Diver courses.
- Confined Water Diver - The IAHD Confined Water Diver course is developed for people with physical or minor mental disabilities, who want to learn to dive but cannot, or do not want to dive in open water. On completion of the course, the diver is certified to dive in a swimming pool or comparable confined water environment.
- Open Water Diver - The IAHD Open Water Diver course is designed to teach people with physical or minor mental disabilities, the theory and dive skills needed to dive safely in an open water environment.

=== Professional courses ===
- Instructor Assistant - An Instructor Assistant may assist an IAHD Instructor during courses and may also independently run 'Scuba Experience' sessions.
- Instructor - The IAHD Instructor course is designed to train diving instructors from recognised diver certification organisations in the knowledge and skills that are required to train and certify people with a physical or minor mental disability to dive, in a safe and enjoyable way. An IAHD Instructor is also authorised to run the IAHD Partner course and, when authorised by IAHD, any IAHD specialty courses in which he or she is certified at Instructor level by a recognised organisation.
- Instructor Trainer - An IAHD Instructor Trainer is responsible for training IAHD Instructors.

=== Partner courses ===
- Surface Support Specialist - For divers and non-divers who intend to assist divers with a physical or minor mental disability, at the waters edge.
- Dive Partner - An advanced course specifically developed to train certified Rescue divers to supervise divers with physical or minor mental disabilities.

== See also ==
- List of diver certification organizations – Agencies which issue certification for competence in diving skills
