= Open Water Diver =

Entry-level autonomous diver certification for recreational scuba diving

Open Water Diver (OWD) is an entry-level autonomous diver certification for recreational scuba diving. Although different agencies use different names, similar entry-level courses are offered by all recreational diving agencies and consist of a combination of knowledge development (theory), confined water dives (practical training) and open water dives (experience) suitable to allow the diver to dive on open circuit scuba, in open water to a limited depth and in conditions similar to those in which the diver has been trained or later gained appropriate experience, to an acceptable level of safety.

Scuba diving education levels as used by ISO, PADI, CMAS, SSI and NAUI

== Minimum training standard ==
The OWD training standard of most agencies complies with the minimum requirements of international Standard ISO 24801-2. Autonomous diver.

== Agencies issuing certification named Open Water Diver ==
The whole PADI training system.

The "Open Water Diver" certification name is used by the Professional Association of Diving Instructors (PADI), Scuba Schools International (SSI), the National Academy of Scuba Educators (NASE) Worldwide, Professional Technical and Recreational Diving (ProTec), International Scuba Certification (ISC), and the Sub-Aqua Association (SAA), which is recognised by the Confédération Mondiale des Activités Subaquatiques (CMAS) as a CMAS 1-star certification. Scuba Diving International calls its equivalent 'Open Water Scuba Diver'.

== Equivalent certification issued by other agencies ==
The National Association of Underwater Instructors (NAUI) entry-level course is called Scuba Diver. The British Sub-Aqua Club (BSAC) calls its equivalent qualification 'Ocean Diver'.

== See also ==
- Diver training – Processes to develop the skills and knowledge to dive safely underwater
- Advanced Open Water Diver – Recreational scuba diving certification slightly above minimum entry level
