= Dive leader =

Recreational diving certification and role

Dive leader is the title of an internationally recognised recreational diving certification. The training standard describes the minimum requirements for dive leader training and certification for recreational scuba divers in international standard ISO 24801-3 and the equivalent European Standard EN 14153-3. Various organizations offer training that meets the requirements of the dive leader standard. Some agencies use the title "Dive Leader" for their equivalent certification, but several other titles are also used, "Divemaster" may be the most widespread, but "Dive Supervisor" or "Dive supervisor are also used, and should not be confused with the very different status and responsibilities of a professional diving supervisor. A person designated as a dive supervisor or dive marshall is more likely to be a topside group organisor, while divemaster and dive leader are more likely to imply in-water diver group leadership. CMAS affiliates certifications which meet the requirements of CMAS 3-star diver should meet the standard by default. The occupation of a dive leader is also known as "dive guide", and is a specialist application of a "tour guide".

Scuba dive leaders are considered competent to plan, organise and conduct dives and to lead other recreational divers on open water dives, and for specialised recreational scuba diving activities for which they have been trained. They are also considered competent to conduct emergency procedures associated with these activities and the relevant diving environment. They may require orientation for unfamiliar local environmental conditions. Additional specialised training and experience is required to lead divers on more demanding dives.

The term is also used by BSAC for a specific certification.

== Scope of the standard ==
International standard ISO 24801-3 includes:

- Prerequisites for training, including age and health requirements:
  - Minimum age 18 years,
  - Minimum certification is to comply with all requirements for ISO 24801-2 level 2 Autonomous diver with logged experience in at least 60 logged dives, or 50 dives with at least 25 hours dive time, of which 40 must have been done after qualifying at level 2. Dives should include:
    - Night diving;
    - Diving in low visibility;
    - Deep diving;
    - Underwater navigation;
    - Diving in a current of at least 0.25 m/s;
    - Diving in cold water (<10°C).
- Required theoretical knowledge regarding scuba and basic diving equipment, the basic physics of diving, decompression management and dive planning, medical and psychological problems related to diving, the diving environment and the use of nitrox breathing gases, including sufficient theoretical knowledge of the following topics to plan dives in typical local environments, plan for and manage reasonably foreseeable emergencies for these environments:
  - Diving equipment;
  - Diving physics;
  - Diving medicine;
  - The use of dive tables and dive computers;
  - Environmental conditions and their influences;
  - Dive planning and management;
  - Communication underwater and at the surface;
  - Recommended safe diving practices for;
    - Boat diving;
    - Night diving;
    - Diving in low visibility conditions;
    - Deep diving;
    - Diving in tides and currents;
  - Restrictions on diving in waters without direct ascent to the surface;
  - Underwater navigation;
  - Accident management;
  - Procedures in the event that contact with the dive buddy is lost;
  - Knowledge of regionally applicable legislation relevant to recreational diving.
- Required scuba skills in confined and open water. These include deep diving and navigation skills, and leadership skills.
  - Diving skills must be sufficient to deal with the most demanding circumstances likely for the regional environment, taking into account;
    - Depths beyond those suitable for a Level 2 recreational scuba diver;
    - Visibility;
    - Size and experience of the guided group;
    - Equipment in use;
    - Currents;
    - Surface conditions;
    - Water temperature.
  - A high degree of mastery is required in;
    - Use of mask, fins and snorkel;
    - Assembly and disassembly of diving equipment in preparation for the dive, and for user maintenance;
    - Pre-dive inspection of the equipment and buddy checks on land and in the water;
    - Water entries and exits;
    - Establishing correct weighting and trim;
    - Clearing the snorkel and the regulator;
    - Change between regulator and snorkel on the surface;
    - Controlled descent and ascent with pressure equalization of the ears and mask;
    - Efficient underwater swimming, with appropriate buoyancy and depth control;
    - Recover and replace mask;
    - Buddy system procedures, including hand signals, and staying together.
    - Buoyancy control underwater and at the surface;
    - Managing routine contingencies like regulator recovery;
    - Monitoring the dive profile on the instruments;
    - Use of the quick release for the weighting system at the surface;
    - Removal and refitting of the weighting system in the water;
    - Fitting the diving equipment at the surface;
    - Emergency ascent procedures as a recipient and as a donor, including emergency ascents and use of an alternative breathing gas supply;
    - Use of surface marker buoys
  - The diver must be competent to plan and lead dives beyond the usual recreational depth range, taking into account;
    - Nitrogen narcosis;
    - Breathing gas consumption and respiration rates;
    - Decompression limits;
    - Safe ascent procedures including decompression stops;
    - Changes in buoyancy;
    - Use of special equipment such as an emergency breathing gas supply;
    - Emergency equipment and procedures.
  - The diver must demonstrate mastery of underwater navigation.
    - Skills in planning, organizing and conducting their dives, and leading other recreational scuba divers using both instruments and natural navigation methods.
- Diver rescue skills:
  - Recognition of an emergency
  - Underwater search
  - Controlled recovery from underwater
  - Effective management at the surface
  - Recovery from the water
  - Management of the emergency and coordination of rescue services
  - First Aid certification
  - Oxygen administration for diving accidents
- Practical training parameters,
- Evaluation of knowledge and practical skills, and a minimum standard for experience as a number of open water dives.

== Equivalent certification to ISO 24801-3 ==
Lowest recreational diver qualifications from various agencies which comply with ISO 24801-3 Diver level 3, Autonomous Dive Leader. The standards for these certifications may exceed Diver level 3 by a variable and unspecified amount - the equivalency is not reciprocal.

- ACUC: Divemaster
- ADS: Divemaster
- ANDI: Divemaster
- BSAC: Dive Leader
- CMAS: 3-star
- DMT NASE UK: Advanced Rescue Diver
- ESA: Divemaster, Diveleader
- FEDAS: Buceador 2 Estrellas
- GUE: Recreational Diver 2
- IAC: Dive Leader Professional
- IADS: Advanced Certification
- IDA: Dive Guide
- IANTD: Rescue Diver Divemaster / Cavern Divemaster
- IDEA: Divemaster
- IDIC: Dive Supervisor
- ITDA: Rescue Diver, Pro Guide
- LA Co UW: Advanced Certification
- NADD: Divemaster
- NASE: Master Diver, Divemaster
- NASDS: Dive Supervisor, Divemaster
- NAUI: Divemaster, Assistant Instructor
- PADI: Divemaster
- PDA: Divemaster
- PSAI: Advanced Deep Air Level 1, Divemaster-Assistant Instructors
- PDIC Dive Supervisor
- PSS: Divemaster
- PTRD: 3 star diver
- RAID: Divemaster
- SAA: Dive Leader
- SDI: Divemaster
- SNSI: Divemaster, Dive Guide
- SSAC: Master Diver
- SSI: Dive Guide
- TSA: Recreational DIVER 3, Divemaster
- UTD: Master diver, Divemaster
- WRSTC: Recreational Dive Supervisor Certification

== Medical fitness to dive ==
Before initial diver training and thereafter at regular intervals, a diver should undergo a fitness to dive examination by a diving doctor. This may be considered more important for a dive leader who has a duty of care to their clients. In some countries, such an examination is required by law and it is a prerequisite for any training in many diving schools.
