= Divemaster =

Recreational dive leader certification and role

A divemaster (DM) is a role that includes organising and leading recreational dives, particularly in a professional capacity, and is a qualification used in many parts of the world in recreational scuba diving for a diver who has supervisory responsibility for a group of divers and as a dive guide. As well as being a generic term, 'Divemaster' is the title of the first professional rating of many training agencies, such as PADI, SSI, SDI, NASE, except NAUI, which rates a NAUI Divemaster under a NAUI Instructor but above a NAUI Assistant Instructor. The divemaster certification is generally equivalent to the requirements of ISO 24801-3 Dive Leader.

The British Sub-Aqua Club (BSAC) recognizes several agencies' divemaster certificates as equivalent to BSAC Dive Leader, but not to BSAC Advanced Diver. The converse may not be true.

The certification is a prerequisite for training as an instructor in recreational diving with the professional agencies except NAUI, where it is an optional step, because of the different position of the NAUI Divemaster in the NAUI hierarchy.

== Role ==
Scuba diving education levels as used by ISO, PADI, CMAS, SSI and NAUI

The role of a divemaster may vary, but will generally include the following roles:

- Organizing, conducting and supervising recreational diving activities (but not training), both shore and boat based.
- Assisting instructors in conducting training programs and activities for certified divers.
- Generally supervising non-training related diving activities by planning, organizing and directing dives.
  - assessing the hazards of a dive site and informing the divers of the hazards,
  - briefing divers on the layout and points of interest of a dive site,
  - suggesting routes for a dive at a specific site for autonomous divers,
  - checking divers into and out of the water from a boat or shore entry point,
  - leading a group of divers in the water as a tour guide.
- Within the limits of some agencies, divemasters may:
  - act as instructional assistants to instructors.
  - supervise participants in experience programs for uncertified divers, if also certified as a "Discovery Dive Leader".
  - teach and certify skin divers and snorkellers.
  - conduct scuba review programs for certified divers.

== Responsibility and legal position ==
The legal duty of care of a divemaster to a client varies according to the legislation of the country, where it is often poorly defined. The use of waivers and/or assumption of risk forms that are intended to minimize legal accountability of divemasters is a common practice, but the validity of such waivers will vary with the legislation. If a divemaster provides safety information to a group of divers or professionally advises them regarding a dive site they may incur a duty of care to those divers.

== Equivalence of certification ==
The following certifications are recognised as meeting or exceeding the requirements of EN/ISO 24801-3:2014:

- ACUC Divemaster
- ANDI Divemaster
- BSAC Dive Leader
- CMAS 3-star Diver
- DMT NASE Divemaster
- IANTD Divemaster
- NASDS Divemaster
- NAUI Divemaster
- PADI Divemaster
- ProTec Dive Master
- PSAI Divemaster
- SAA Dive Leader(?), Dive Supervisor
- SDI Divemaster
- SNSI Divemaster
- SSI Dive Guide

== Equivalence in other fields of diving ==
=== Technical diving ===
In technical diving, divers are assumed to be competent and responsible for their own safety or the safety of the team of which they are members to the extent that is agreed by that team. It is not unusual for a technical team or expedition group to appoint one of their number as a team leader or surface dive marshall, but the surface marshall is often more of an administrative position, who will check divers into and out of the water, and the dive team leader is more the navigator, or the person in front of the group than someone making safety decisions for other divers. Most technical divers follow the principle that any diver may call an end to a dive at any time for any reason, and that the team will comply, following the previously agreed termination procedure.

NAUI has a Technical Support Leader course that is designed to train NAUI Divemasters and Assistant Instructors who are also technical divers in this role.

=== Professional diving ===
Professional divers generally work in teams which have one or more divers in the water and a supervisor on the surface, with one or more assistants for handling lifelines, umbilicals, communications, gas panels and other support equipment, and a stand-by diver who is responsible for assisting or rescuing the in-water divers in an emergency. In these circumstances the supervisor has a high and legally defined level of responsibility for the safety of the dive team and anyone else on site.

== Employment opportunities and conditions ==
Divemasters have the ability to work in holiday destinations in many parts of the world. They may work in diving resorts, private yachts, cruise ships and dive centres – anywhere where there is a demand for organised recreational diving.

Many divemasters also work in retail dive facilities and assist the instructor with training and supervision.

== Training ==
During Divemaster training, candidates learn dive leadership skills through classroom, independent study and practical training exercises. Some Divemaster programs require an internship program too. They complete water skills and stamina exercises, training exercises that improve their ability to organize and solve problems and help others to improve their abilities.

Candidates put this knowledge into action through a structured internship or a series of practical training exercises, including the candidate assisting in actual diving programs with real diving students.

Divers can develop to divemaster level through two different methods. Either through progressing along the recreational levels of diving, or through divemaster internships that fast-track the candidate to divemaster level by having them become involved in the training facility where they are training. Divemaster internships are offered by many different dive shops under their respective organizations( PADI, NAUI, SSI, etc.)The internship program allows the divemaster candidate to not only complete the minimum learning requirements, but to also "intern" and practice what has been learned.

=== Prerequisites for training ===
The whole PADI training system.

PADI and SDI Divemaster candidates must have reached the following minimum requirements prior to their divemaster training:

- Advanced Open Water Diver certification (or qualifying certification from another training organization)
- Rescue Diver certification (or qualifying certification from another training organization)
- First Aid & CPR training (preferably with automated external defibrillator (AED) training)
- 40 logged dives
- Submit a medical statement signed by a physician within the last 12 months.

NASE requires divemaster candidates to also have demonstrated competency in physics, physiology, skills and environment, dive planning and equipment prior to entering a program.

PADI Divemaster candidates must have completed 60 logged dives prior to certification.

==== NAUI ====
Divemaster is a NAUI leadership-level certification between Assistant Instructor and Instructor, in contrast to agencies such as PADI that rate divemaster as the lowest level of leadership qualification. A NAUI Divemaster may organize and conduct dives for certified divers and is qualified to assist active-status NAUI Instructors on diver training courses.

NAUI provides a core of leadership-level skills and knowledge in the NAUI Master Scuba Diver and NAUI Scuba Rescue Diver courses, which are necessary prerequisites for all NAUI leadership programs. Divemaster candidates who offer equivalent certification must still pass the NAUI Master Scuba Diver written examination. Divemaster candidates must either hold a NAUI Assistant Instructor qualification, or have a minimum of 60 logged open water dives demonstrating varied environment, depth and activities, as well as water skills equal to those expected of an Assistant Instructor.

Holding a NAUI Divemaster certificate is one of three ways in which the diver certification requirements for a NAUI Instructor Training Course may be met.
