= Open-water diving =

Diving with access to breathable air of the atmosphere

Open-water diving is underwater diving in an open water environment, where the diver has unrestricted access by way of a direct vertical ascent to the breathable air of the atmosphere. Other environmental hazards may exist which do not affect the classification. Open water diving mode implies that if a problem arises, the diver can directly ascend vertically to the atmosphere to breathe air, so it is also understood that, with this restriction, a staged decompression obligation is incompatible with the open water diving mode, though it does not affect classification of the environment. This meaning is implied in the certifications titled Open Water Diver and variations thereof.

== Open water environment ==
In underwater diving, open water is unrestricted water such as a sea, lake, river, or flooded quarry. It is a contradistinction to an overhead environment, where there is a physical barrier to direct vertical ascent to the surface, and to a flooded confined space where there may not be enough room to maneuver freely. In open water the diver has direct vertical access to the surface of the water in contact with the Earth's atmosphere.

Environments which by definition are not open water include overhead environments, and diving in these is called Penetration diving. This may involve entering caves or wrecks, or diving under ice or the hull of a large ship. In some contexts the lack of a decompression obligation is considered a necessary condition for classification of a dive as an open water dive, as a decompression obligation is a procedural and safety restriction on immediate ascent to the surface, but this does not affect the classification of the venue as open water.

Swim-throughs – the recreational diving term for arches and short, clear, tunnels where the natural light can be seen at the far end, and there is enough clearance that it is theoretically possible for the diver to pass through the narrowest point without contact with the sides, bottom or ceiling, are technically an overhead environment, but this is often overlooked by divers as there is no risk of getting lost inside, and the risk of entrapment is generally low.

Divers progress from learning diving skills in confined or benign water such as a swimming pool to practicing skills in open water in which the environment is not restricted to a small, controlled locality and depth, with conditions more typical of a natural body of water which might be used by divers, and the range of hazards and associated risk is significantly expanded. In this context confined water and benign water are special cases of open water, as they comply with the more general condition of unobstructed access to the surface.

Some recreational diver certification agencies use a variation on this term in the title of their entry level diver certification. Open Water Diver certification implies that the diver is competent to dive in unrestricted water, with various constraints regarding the conditions, and particularly that their competence is limited to diving in open water with free access to the surface.

There are a few variations of open water environments with more specific names. There are also a number of named diving environments which are usually also open water environments.

=== Open ocean ===
The extreme case of open water is the deep open ocean, where the bottom is at a depth which is irrelevant to the diver as there would be no chance of surviving long enough to reach it. Open oceanic water is often remarkably clear, but this is not always the case. There is no natural visual reference for depth in the open ocean, and depth monitoring and control is critically important to diver safety.

=== Blue-water diving ===
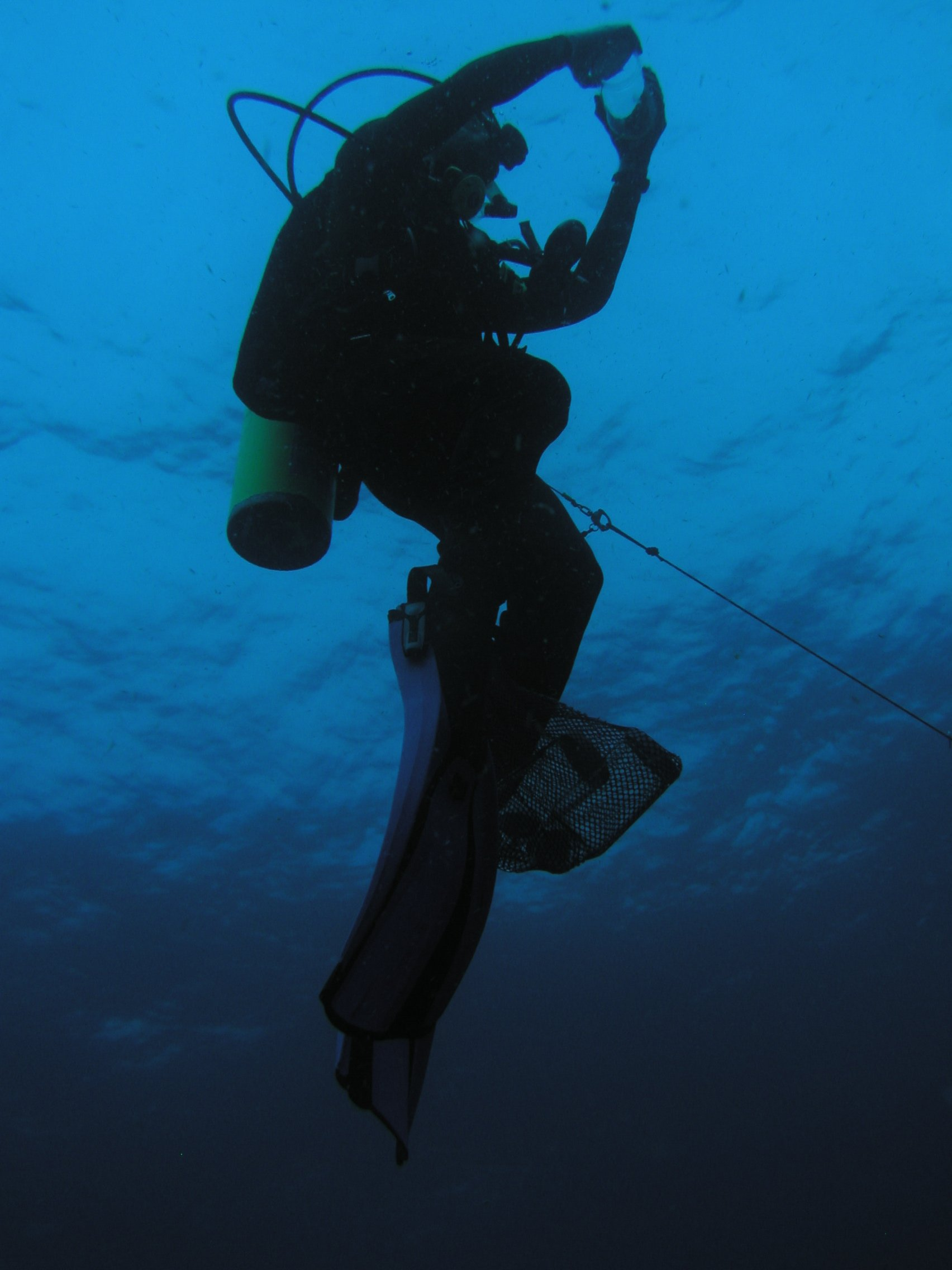
Tethered diver in blue water dive observing fauna in the water column

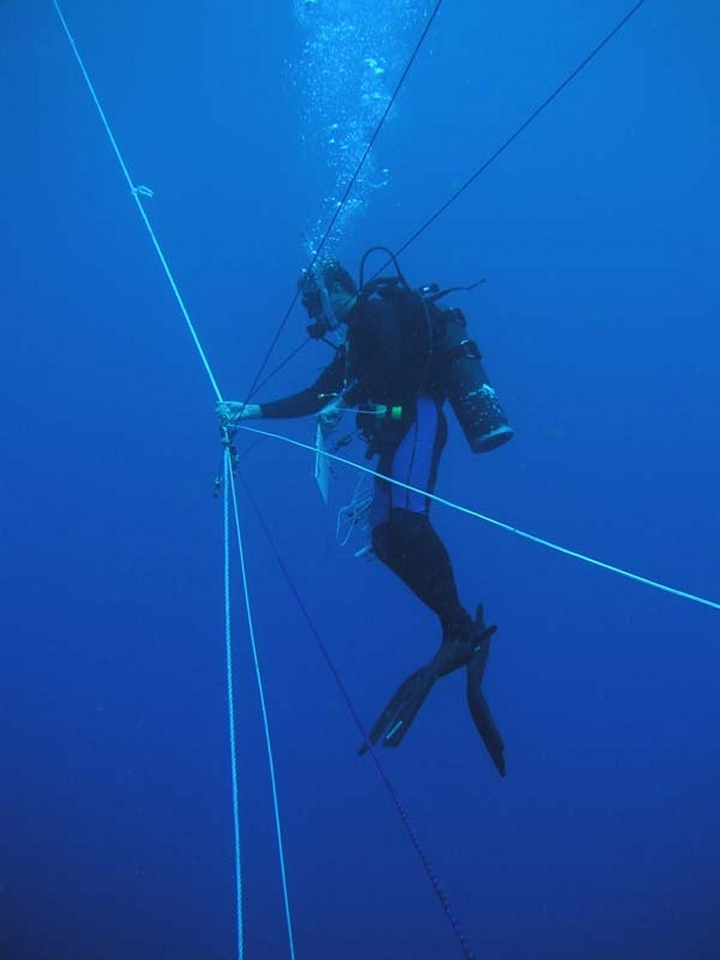
Marine scientist coordinates a blue water dive for 4 companions - each at the end of a rope tether and each rope kept taut by a weight and pulley system

Blue-water diving is done in mid-water where the bottom is out of sight of the diver and there may be no fixed visual reference. It is done by scientific divers for direct observation and sampling of pelagic organisms and particulate matter, particularly the gelatinous zoo-plankton that are fragile and transparent, making them relatively inaccessible by other methods, and by recreational divers for observation and photography of a range of organisms not easily seen in inshore waters.

The techniques of blue-water diving have been developed over the years to suit the conditions and address the hazards of an environment which is functionally bottomless, and has no fixed visible positional references. The diver who is focused on small organisms or instruments at close range is likely to have diminished awareness of depth, buoyancy, current, surge, other divers, large organisms, and even the direction to the surface.

An accepted procedure for scientific blue-water collection diving with several working divers, is to tether the working divers to a central hub connected to a surface platform, and to have an in-water safety diver attend the hub. The tethers pass through fairleads at the hub and are tensioned by a weight at the end, which keeps slack out of the line and thereby reduces the risk of entanglement, and prevents the end of the line from passing through the fairlead. The tether serves to limit the distance a diver can move away from the hub, which is typically fastened to a substantial downline supported by a large buoy at the surface, and kept vertical by a weight. The float at the surface allows the divers to move freely in the water column within the constraint of the tether, and drift with the current. The tethers also allow rope signals between the safety diver and the working divers. The surface platform, generally a small boat, may be tethered to the buoy, and if there is sufficient wind to make this a problem a parachute sea anchor can be deployed to minimise drift. Windage will generally position the buoy and boat downwind of the parachute. The other end of the tether is clipped to the diver's harness or buoyancy compensator by some form of quick-release shackle. These procedures and equipment can also be used at night.

If a sea anchor is deployed to limit drift, it must be kept clear of the divers to minimise the risk of entanglement, and it should be buoyed to prevent sinking in a calm. The sea anchor cable should be buoyant line for the same reason. Blue-water diving operations are constrained by water and weather conditions, including wind, sea state, current strength, visibility, and the presence of aggressive predators.

=== Black-water diving ===
Black-water diving is mid-water diving at night, particularly on a moonless night. The environment is referred to as black-water. The term black-water may also be used to refer to diving in zero visibility, or in sewage. Christopher Newbert, author of Within a Rainbow Sea, (1984) is credited as an early black-water diver. In his book, he describes solo offshore night dives to depths of up to 150 feet (46 m). Black-water diving is often done as a photographic opportunity for recreational divers as there can be a wide range of plankton that would not often be seen by day or closer inshore. This is known as blackwater photography.

Weighted downlines are commonly used to provide a stable vertical reference. These may be tied to the boat or supported by a buoy. Each diver may be attached to a downline using a shorter tether to ensure that divers do not go too far from the boat or too deep. The downline may be marked with lights to indicate depth and to attract mobile organisms. A wide range of animal life may be seen, including many species that spend the daylight hours at depths below those accessible to ambient pressure divers, and migrate vertically through the water column on a diurnal cycle. Many of these are bioluminescent or translucent or both.

The boat moves differently from the divers and the divers move differently from the plankton, making it necessary to work to get a position from which there will be enough time to frame and take photos of the drifting subjects. The boat will drift under the influence of current and wind, while the divers and plankton will drift with the current. If there is wind the boat will drag the downlines, and if tethered to the buoy, it will drag the buoy and divers attached. If divers swim ahead of the towing action, they will have a short time to drift with the plankton and take photos until the slack in the line has been taken up, at which point the plankton will be left behind. This drift problem can be reduced by setting a parachute anchor, which will reduce wind drift to a negligible amount. The divers should stay clear of the entanglement hazard of the parachute suspension lines.

=== Confined water ===
At the other extreme from the open ocean, confined water is open water where it is not possible to inadvertently stray outside the designated area due to physical barriers. Usually this also refers to an area of known low risk and minimal hazard – benign water.

The term is often used to refer to a swimming pool or tank where initial skills training of divers takes place, which is both confined and benign. The Queensland government defines confined water for recreational diving purposes as "Water which offers pool-like conditions, good visibility, and water which is shallow enough so that all divers can stand up with their heads well clear of the water". Other definitions do not require such shallow depth, but may have a depth restriction.

Confined water has some of the characteristics of benign water, in that it is not possible to accidentally stray from the environment, but although some usages of the term confined water imply benign conditions, that meaning is not inherent in the term, as water in a confined space may logically be referred to as confined water, and such confined water may contain significant hazards.

=== Benign water ===
Benign water is open water in the sense of a directly accessible free surface, with very low risk and no unknown hazards, where it is unlikely or impossible for a diver to accidentally stray to an area of higher risk. Some definitions add a depth limit and that the water must also be confined.

Benign conditions are environments of low risk, where it is extremely unlikely or impossible for the diver to get lost or entrapped, or be exposed to hazards other than the basic underwater environment. These conditions are suitable for initial training in the critical survival skills, and include swimming pools, training tanks, aquarium tanks and some shallow and protected shoreline areas.
