= Master Scuba Diver =

Scuba diver certification

Master Scuba Diver (MSD) is a scuba diving certification or recognition level offered by several North American diver training agencies, such as the National Association of Underwater Instructors (NAUI), the Professional Association of Diving Instructors (PADI), Scuba Diving International (SDI), and Scuba Schools International (SSI). Other agencies (e.g., The International Association of Nitrox and Technical Divers) offer similar programs under other names, such as "Elite Diver". Each of these (and other) agencies touts their program at this level as the highest, non-leadership program.

Most organizations have a minimum age requirement of 15 to undertake the Master Scuba Diver course, although some organizations do permit certification of "Junior" Master Scuba Divers.

== Methodology ==
Different agencies take different approaches to this program creating both a disparate level of indicated diver competence both within most agencies as well as from agency to agency. The specific methodologies of the main agencies are as follows:

=== IANTD ===
IANTD awards their Elite Diver Recognition to a diver who completes:

- IANTD Advanced Open Water Diver.
- Three IANTD specialties: Deep, EANx, Rescue and Navigation.
- Any two other IANTD specialties.

=== NAUI ===
The NAUI Master Scuba Diver course is one of such courses that has both skill based and academic component. The course was designed by Paul Heinmiller (NAUI 5141L) and Phil Sharkey (NAUI 4505L), to meet a specific need that had been identified by the NAUI membership: a clearly defined course that provides, assesses, and certifies for all the academic and skills training required of a NAUI Instructor, excepting topics covering teaching and supervision of students and certified divers, topics that are part of NAUI's Divemaster and Instructor Training Courses. The NAUI Master Scuba Diver course involves training in the theory and practice of:

- Emergency procedures and rescue
- Deep/simulated decompression diving
- Limited visibility or night diving
- Underwater navigation
- Search and recovery – light salvage

=== PADI ===
The whole PADI training system.

PADI awards their Master Scuba Diver Recognition to a diver who completes:

- PADI Advanced Open Water Diver course or equivalent
- PADI Rescue Diver course
- EFR Emergency First Response course
- any Five different PADI specialty diving courses (not counting the Rescue Diver or EFR course)
- Logs 50 dives

=== SDI ===
SDI awards their Master Scuba Diver Recognition rating to a diver who completes:

- SDI Advanced Open Water Diver course
- SDI Rescue Diver course
- Completion of 4 SDI, TDI, or ERDI Specialty Courses or equivalent; only 1 course without dives, may be credited towards the master diver development program, with the exception of nitrox
- Logs 50 dives

=== SSI ===
SSI awards their Master Diver Recognition to any diver who completes:

- any four different SSI Specialty Diving courses
- SSI Diver Stress & Rescue course
- Logs 50 dives
