= National Academy of Scuba Educators =

Recreational scuba training and certification agency

- Abbreviation: NASE
- Formation: 1982
- Headquarters: Ocala, Florida, USA
- Location: 9487 NW 115th Ave, Ocala, Florida 34482
- Parent organization: CDA Technical Institute (CDA), formerly Commercial Diving Academy
- Website: www.naseworldwide.org

The National Academy of Scuba Educators, also known as NASE Worldwide, is a recreational scuba training organization which was founded in Texas during 1982. In February 2011 NASE re-launched its image and developed new standards and practices. NASE's training program consists of three streams - recreational scuba diving, technical and professional diving in the recreational field (instructors and divemasters). NASE operates in Colombia, Chile, South Korea, Russia and the United States of America. It has a program of resort and dive center recognition with businesses recognised in the following countries - Barbados, Canada, Fiji, Honduras, Malaysia, and the Turks and Caicos Islands.

== EUF Certification ==
NASE Worldwide Inc. obtained CEN certification from the EUF certification body in 2008 and was re-certified in February 2016.
