= Diving instructor =

Person who trains and assesses underwater divers

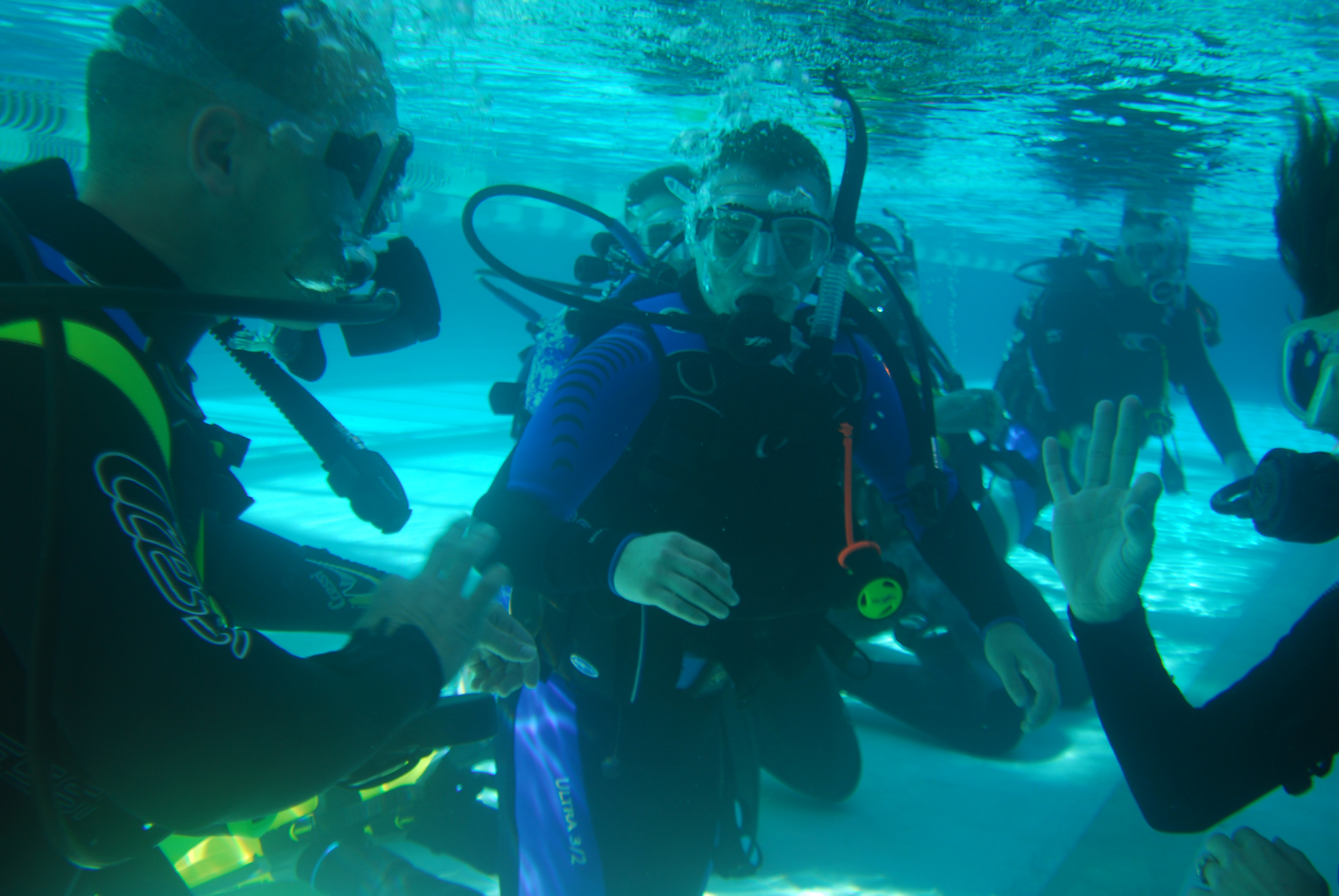
Instructor and learner divers practicing scuba skills in confined water

A diving instructor is a person who trains, and usually also assesses competence, of underwater divers. This includes freedivers, recreational divers including the subcategory technical divers, and professional divers which includes military, commercial, public safety and scientific divers.

Depending on the jurisdiction, there will generally be specific published codes of practice and guidelines for training, competence and registration of diving instructors, as they have a duty of care to their clients, and operate in an environment with intrinsic hazards which may be unfamiliar to the lay person. Training and assessment will generally follow a diver training standard, and may use a diver training manual as source material.

Recreational diving instructors are usually registered members of one or more recreational diver certification agencies, and are generally registered to train and assess divers against specified certification standards. Originally these standards were at the discretion of each training and certification agency, but inter-agency and international standards now exist to ensure that the basic skills required for acceptable safety are included as a minimum standard for both instructors and recreational divers. Military diving instructors are generally members of the armed force for which they train personnel. Commercial diving instructors may be required to register with national government appointed organisations, and comply with specific training and assessment standards, but there may be other requirements in some parts of the world.

== Function ==
Scuba diving education levels as used by ISO, PADI, CMAS, SSI and NAUI

A diving instructor trains and assesses the competence of persons who intend to become underwater divers. The recreational diving instructor may use training standards and materials provided by the certifying organisation, or may develop their own suitable training materials, depending on the training system and authority involved. Most recreational training and certification agencies provide suitable training materials and require their registered instructors to train and assess using the materials provided.

Commercial diving schools may have a broader scope of options, and may be expected to develop and maintain their own training materials, which may be required to comply with a published training standard.

== History ==
=== Commercial ===
The earliest known diving manual was written by the Deane brothers in 1836. This described the use of the Deane helmet, which was not attached to the suit, and was open to the water at the bottom, and would flood if the diver bent over or fell, but could not cause helmet squeeze. Siebe Gorman produced diving manuals in the 19th century. By 1883 the Siebe Gorman manual was available in Spanish: Siebe y Gorman (1883). Manual Del Buzo E Instrucciones Para Operaciones Submarinas. Madrid: Imprenta De Fortanet. pp. 64 pages and 16 plates.

=== Recreational ===
In 1953, Jack Atkinson, the first National Diving Officer of the British Sub-Aqua Club, and Colin McLeod started a system of training and accreditation for Third Class, Second Class and First Class Divers, which was based on the three-tier system with which they were familiar, as used for divers in the UK armed forces. This programme was developed over the next six years culminating in the first BSAC Diving Manual, published in 1959. Oscar Gugen, one of BSAC's founders, and George Brookes travelled the UK helping to set up branches of BSAC, all of which used amateur instructors to deliver the BSAC training programme within the club setting.

In 1955, Dottie Frazier became the world's first female scuba diving instructor. Dottie Frazier is also recognized as the first female hard-hat diver, first female instructor and the first female to own and operate her own dive shop. Along with diving, Frazier also worked with the United States Navy to design wet suits and dry suits for military and recreational divers.

In 1959, The YMCA developed the first nationally organised scuba diving course and certified their first skin and scuba diving instructors in the United States.

=== Scientific ===
When a scientific diving operation is part of the duties of the diver as an employee, the operation may be considered a professional diving operation subject to regulation as such. In these cases the training and registration may follow the same requirements as for other professional divers, or may include training standards specifically intended for scientific diving. In other cases, where the divers are in full control of their own diving operation, including planning and safety, diving as volunteers, the occupational health and safety regulations may not apply.

Where scientific diving is exempt from commercial diving regulation, training requirements may differ considerably, and in some cases basic scientific diver training and certification may not differ much from entry level recreational diver training.

Technological advances have made it possible for scientific divers to accomplish more on a dive, but they have also increased the complexity and the task loading of both the diving equipment and the work done, and consequently require higher levels of training and preparation to safely and effectively use this technology. It is preferable for effective learning and safety that such specialisation training is done systematically and under controlled conditions, rather than on site and on the job. Environmental conditions for training should include exercises in conditions as close as reasonably practicable to field conditions.

- Scripps certification cards, AAUS exemption.

== Training and registration ==
A diving instructor is as a rule required to be qualified as a diver to at least the same level as the divers to be trained. Additional requirements vary.

=== Professional ===
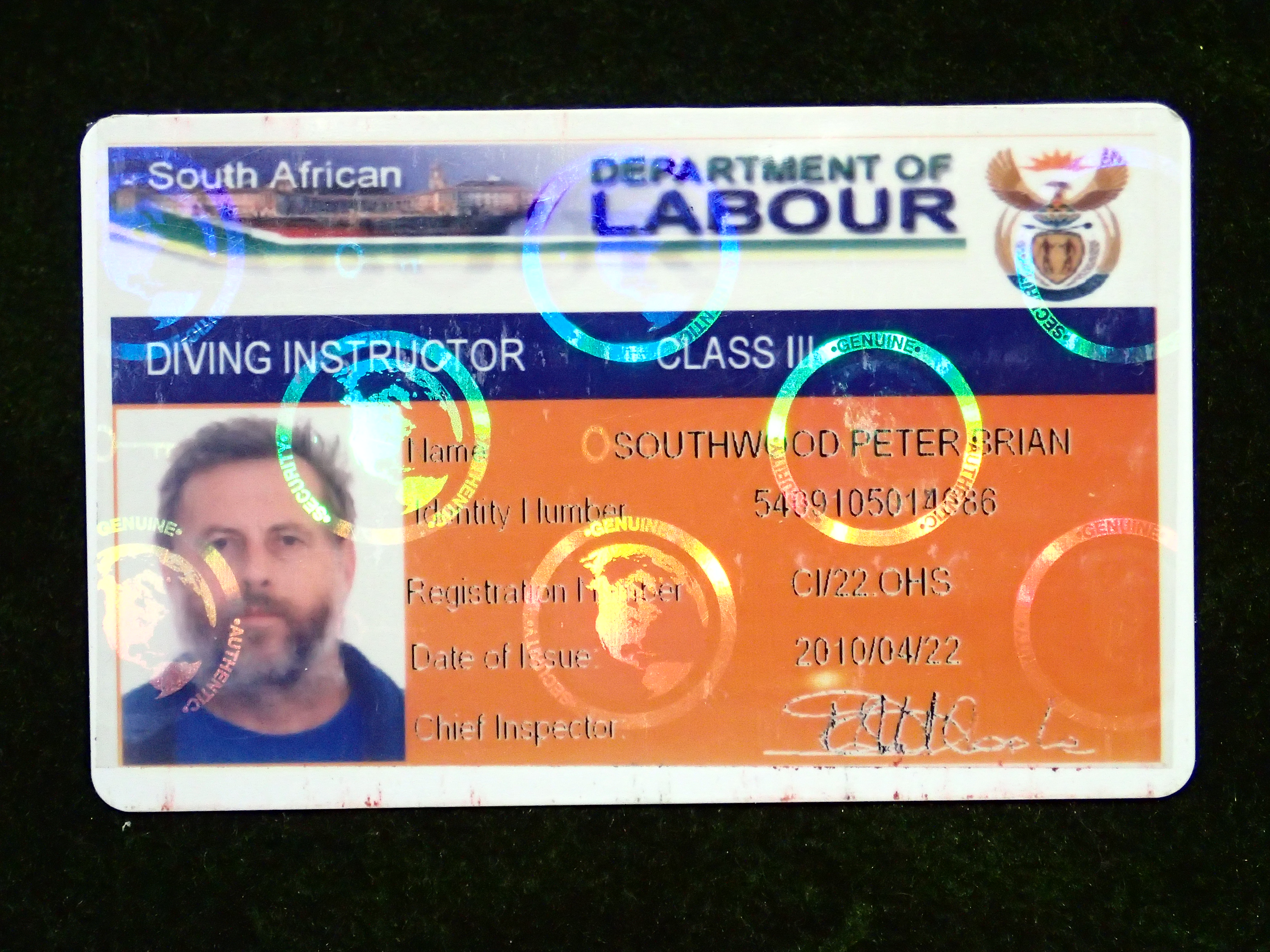
South African Department of Labour Class III Diving Instructor registration card

Instructors of professional divers are generally required to be qualified as supervisors for the level of diver they can train, and may also be required to have some qualification in adult education as facilitators, assessors or moderators, and to be registered with a governing body. There is usually also a requirement for some experience in the industry before a diver can be trained as a supervisor, and similarly before a supervisor can become an instructor. The detail requirements vary depending on the jurisdiction.

In South Africa a commercial diving instructor is registered by the Department of Employment and Labour for the class of diving they are considered competent to instruct, and can only instruct learner commercial divers through a commercial diving school, also registered with the Department of Labour. The minimum requirement for registration as a commercial diving instructor include registration and practical experience as a Diving Supervisor of the same class and certification or equivalent work experience as a training facilitator in adult education.

For example, the minimum requirement for registration as a Class IV Commercial Scuba Instructor would be:

- Pass the practical and theory assessments and other requirements for Class IV Commercial Scuba Diver, including a minimum of 30 dives with a minimum logged time of 15 hours and apply for registration. This is usually a full-time course for about 20 working days.
- Have held Class IV Commercial Scuba Diver registration for a minimum of 1 year and 50 logged commercial dives after qualification to qualify for Supervisor training.
- Hold in date Level 2 First Aid certification. This is usually a three-day full-time course including assessment.
- Hold in date topside or commercial diving certificate of medical fitness issued by a registered Diving Medical Practitioner and registered on the Southern African Undersea and Hyperbaric Medical Association (SAUHMA) national database.
- Attend and pass the requirements of a Class IV Commercial Scuba Supervisor training programme, which includes about 5 days of theory classwork. The practical requirement of a minimum of 100 hours supervisory experience under the direct supervision of a registered supervisor usually takes several months to complete, but it is possible to do it in a month. After this the school will apply for registration of the applicant as a class IV supervisor.
- Have held a Class IV Commercial Scuba Supervisor registration for a minimum of 3 years.
- Hold a certification as an adult education training facilitator to a recognised national standard, or equivalent qualification or experience. Minimum 2 days full-time.
- Recommendation from the registered commercial diving school at which they are employed.

The total time required is more than 4 years, including training and work experience.

Similar requirements apply to registration as surface supplied air, mixed gas, and saturation diving instructors. In each case the applicant must first be qualified and have appropriate work experience as a diver, then supervisor in the class of diving before being eligible for application for registration as an instructor for that class of diving.

=== Recreational ===
Recreational diving instructors may be subject to significantly less stringent requirements. These are set by the certification agencies to which they are affiliated, and may also be specifically or generally regulated by health and safety legislation. In the UK the Diving at Work Regulations specifically include training of recreational divers, while in the US and South Africa, the professional diving regulations specifically exclude recreational diving instruction, but in South Africa the work is covered by the general constraints of the Occupational Health and Safety Act, 1993.

==== Recreational diving instructors ====
Minimum requirements to attend a recreational diving instructor training programme vary between certification agencies. The requirements for PADI Instructor Development Course (IDC) are 6 months as a certified diver, registration as a PADI Divemaster, with 60 logged dives, a medical statement that the applicant does not suffer from a disqualifying medical condition and recent participation in PADI Emergency First Response training. The IDC takes five to seven days, and comprises two parts, Assistant Instructor training, and Open Water Scuba Instructor training. During the IDC the candidate will learn PADI Standards and Procedures, the PADI system of instruction, diver safety and risk management, the role of the diving instructor in the recreational diving industry, and marketing and sales counseling for recreational diving business. 100 logged dives are required before the applicant can take the two-day Instructor Examination. The basic PADI Open Water Instructor is limited in which specialties they can instruct, and there are a relatively large number of further courses that must be taken to teach other specialties.

CMAS has a tiered system of instructor qualifications, from 1-star to 3-star. The prerequisites for 1-star instructor are a minimum age of 18 years, a certificate of medical fitness to dive, having held a CMAS 3-star diver certificate for at least a year, basic first aid and CPR certification, and emergency oxygen administration from CMAS or a recognised equivalent. Diving experience must include at least one hundred logged open water dives, including night dives, low visibility dives, deeper dives to depths between forty and fifty-six meters, drift dives, dives in cold water and navigation dives. The candidate must complete all the assessments, which include thorough knowledge of all diving theory and skills prescribed in the diver training standards, confined water skills and teaching them, open water skills, demonstrate competence in all the water skills required for 3-star diver certification at an exemplary level, perform risk assessment for in-water training, teaching and lesson preparation and delivery skills, and emergency procedure skills of diver rescue, rescue management and oxygen administration to the published standards.

ISO publishes standards for recreational diving instructors, specifying minimum required experience and competency of scuba instructors, and relevant requirements for safety practices for recreational scuba diving service providers. ISO 24802-1:2014 Recreational diving services – Requirements for the training of scuba instructors – Part 1: Level 1, and ISO 24802-2:2014 Recreational diving services – Requirements for the training of scuba instructors – Part 2: Level 2 refer to the competence required of a recreational scuba instructor and specify the associated evaluation criteria. The ISO standards recognise two levels of instructor. Individual training agencies may list as many as 20 levels and specialties of instructor, each requiring further training and certification, which provides employment for instructor trainers and revenue for the agency.

Most training agencies will only issue certificates through instructors who are currently registered with that agency, which is subject to payment of an annual fee. In some parts of the world a diving instructor is required to pass an annual fitness to dive medical examination by a registered diving medical examiner, as they ma be required to assist or rescue a learner in their care.

==== Master Instructor ====
A Master Instructor is a certificate given in recognition of a minimum level of experience in training divers after certification as a Diving Instructor, issued by PADI and SSI.

PADI requires a minimum level of experience in a range of instruction activities, attendance at three or more instructor development seminars, a record of adherence to the official PADI training systems, support of the PADI organisation, and a quality assurance record which has been clean for at least six months. It is a prerequisite for application for course director.

The SSI rating of Master Instructor is issued in recognition of meeting the required level of experience in training and assessment of recreational scuba divers to SSI standards. No additional training is required. It is a required milestone before application for membership of the SSI Product Review Committee and for admission to an Instructor Trainer program.

=== Technical diving instructors ===
Technical diving instructors are recreational diving instructors rated to train recreational divers in technical diving programmes. Exactly which specialties are considered technical diving is at the discretion of the training agency, as there is no legal distinction from recreational diving. Standards vary between certification organisations, but, like recreational specialties, the minimum requirement includes holding the certification for the specialties which they are licensed to teach. Required levels of experience may vary significantly.

As an example, the minimum standard for a CMAS Normoxic Trimix Instructor is to hold a normoxic trimix diver qualification and teaching status as a CMAS Three Star Instructor, complete the CMAS Normoxic Trimix Instructor course and at least 12 normoxic trimix dives.

==== Rebreather instructors ====
There are internationally recognised standards for diving rebreather instructors. These have been published by the International Organization for Standardization (ISO) and were developed in conjunction with the Rebreather Training Council and the Rebreather Education and Safety Association.

EUF Certification International is an independent body for global verification of rebreather training agencies based in Europe and associated with the Austrian Standards organisation. Agencies are certified for five years between renewals. EUF ensures that the agencies comply with the ISO standards and have suitable quality assurance systems to monitor quality of rebreather training by members of each agency.

=== Insurance ===
Insurance can be a significant cost for a diving instructor. This may include:

- Public liability insurance.
- Insurance through the certification agency.
- Medical insurance.
  - Instructor and staff.
  - Learner divers.
- Unemployment insurance.
- Compensation for occupational injury and illness.

Insurance premiums can be high for some specialties and in some countries. Rebreather instructors have been mentioned as paying unusually high insurance rates.

== Employment ==
Professional diving schools generally employ instructors specifically as members of the teaching staff. Recreational instructors may be employed as teaching staff, general staff at a dive shop, with teaching duties, or part-time teaching staff. They may also be self-employed, or train club members on a volunteer basis, for which they may be fully or partly remunerated.

=== Job satisfaction in the recreational diver training industry ===
In 1995, a study conducted on Queensland, Australia diving instructors showed that positive job satisfaction correlated with intention to remain in the dive industry and still active in their present job for the next 12 months. The same study also showed that wages were still a primary concern since it was first noted by Kessler in 1976.

There are a few things not generally mentioned in the advertising for dive instructor training. The training is quite expensive, and requires significant work to recoup costs, The hours are longer than one might think, as there is a lot of paperwork required by some agencies for quality assurance and liability avoidance. Diving certification is normally performance based, if the person cannot learn and perform the skills to the required standard, and there are people who cannot reach the required standard in a reasonable time, it will be necessary to fail them for their own safety and the safety on others who may dive with them. Diving instructor knowledge and skills are not usually recognised as of much value in other occupations.

== See also ==
- Recreational diver training – Training process for people who do not dive at work
- Diver training – Processes to develop the skills and knowledge to dive safely underwater
