= Diving physics =

Aspects of physics which affect the underwater diver

Diving physics, or the physics of underwater diving, is the basic aspects of physics which describe the effects of the underwater environment on the underwater diver and their equipment, and the effects of blending, compressing, and storing breathing gas mixtures, and supplying them for use at ambient pressure. These effects are mostly consequences of immersion in water, the hydrostatic pressure of depth and the effects of pressure and temperature on breathing gases. An understanding of the physics behind is useful when considering the physiological effects of diving, breathing gas planning and management, diver buoyancy control and trim, and the hazards and risks of diving.

Changes in density of breathing gas affect the ability of the diver to breathe effectively, and variations in partial pressure of breathing gas constituents have profound effects on the health and ability to function underwater of the diver.

== Aspects of physics with particular relevance to diving ==

The main laws of physics that describe the influence of the underwater diving environment on the diver and diving equipment include:

=== Buoyancy ===
Archimedes' principle (Buoyancy) - Ignoring the minor effect of surface tension, an object, wholly or partially immersed in a fluid, is buoyed up by a force equal to the weight of the fluid displaced by the object. Thus, when in water, the weight of the volume of water displaced as compared to the weight of the diver's body and the diver's equipment, determine whether the diver floats or sinks. Buoyancy control, and being able to maintain neutral buoyancy in particular, is an important safety skill. The diver needs to understand buoyancy to effectively and safely operate drysuits, buoyancy compensators, diving weighting systems and lifting bags.

=== Pressure ===
The concept of pressure as force distributed over area, the transmission of pressure through hard and soft tissues and physiological gas spaces, and the variation of pressure with immersed depth are central to the understanding of the physiology of diving, particularly the physiology of decompression and of barotrauma.

There are several regions of the body which have a characteristic pressure range relative to the external ambient pressure. (Note: These include blood pressure, intraocular pressure, and intrapulmonary pressure changes during breathing) These are usually measured relative to the atmospheric gas environment, where variation with vertical position is insignificant due to low density of the surrounding gas having a negligible effect on external pressure variation. The pressure distribution therefore varies significantly with height in the body due to hydrostatic pressure variations in the body tissues, which are similar in density to water. Consequently the internal pressures in the body will vary with changes in posture, and with immersion depth in a denser fluid, such as water, following Pascal's law. In air, the hydrostatic pressure of body fluids is supported by the tensile strength and elasticity of the containing tissues. Fully immersed in water the hydrostatic pressure is almost completely balanced by the hydtostatic pressure of the water, and in partial immersion, the hydrostatic support imbalance is a function of the height of the emersed portion. Pressure needed to circulate blood through the vascular system is additional to static pressure.

The absolute pressure on an ambient pressure diver is the sum of the local atmospheric pressure and hydrostatic pressure. Hydrostatic pressure is the component of ambient pressure due to the weight of the water column above the depth, and is commonly described in terms of metres or feet of sea water.

The ambient pressure of the water is transmitted to the diver by direct contact with the skin and indirect contact through the divers suit and soft equipment. The soft tissues are incompressible and the pressure is transferred through them to any gas spaces. Since gases are compressible they will be compressed until the pressure is balanced. In the case of a breath-hold diver the lungs and upper airways must reduce in volume to compress their gaseous contents to balance the pressure in the walls of the gas spaces. If the spaces are not sufficiently compliant, fluids will accumulate in the adjacent tissues, which may be damaged, resulting in oedema and possibly internal haemorrhage. When the diver has an ambient pressure breathing gas supply, ambient pressure gas can flow in to fill the gas space without a forced volume reduction. This inflow of ambient pressure gas is known a pressure equalisation. A similar effect occurs in external gas spaces in contact with the skin or isolated from the body.

The partial pressures of the component gases in a breathing gas mixture control the rate of diffusion into and out of the blood in the lungs, and their concentration in the arterial blood, and the concentration of blood gases affects their physiological effects in the body tissues. Partial pressure calculations are used in breathing gas blending and analysis

A class of diving hazards commonly referred to as delta-P hazards are caused by a pressure difference other than variation of ambient pressure with depth. This pressure difference causes flow that may entrain the diver and carry them to places where injury could occur, such as the intake to a marine thruster or a sluice gate.

=== Gas property changes ===
Gas equations of state, which may be expressed in combination as the Combined gas law, or the Ideal gas law within the range of pressures normally encountered by divers, or as the traditionally expressed gas laws relating the relationships between two properties when the others are held constant, are used to calculate variations of pressure, volume and temperature, such as: Boyle's law, which describes the change in volume with a change in pressure at a constant temperature. For example, the volume of gas in a non-rigid container (such as a diver's lungs or buoyancy compensation device), decreases as external pressure increases while the diver descends in the water. Likewise, the volume of gas in such non-rigid containers increases on the ascent. Changes in the volume of gases in the diver and the diver's equipment affect buoyancy. This creates a positive feedback loop on both ascent and descent. The quantity of open circuit gas breathed by a diver increases with pressure and depth. Charles's law, which describes the change in volume with a change in temperature at a fixed pressure, Gay-Lussac's second law, which describes the change of pressure with a change of temperature for a fixed volume, (originally described by Guillaume Amontons, and sometimes called Amontons's law). This explains why a diver who enters cold water with a warm diving cylinder, for instance after a recent quick fill, finds the gas pressure of the cylinder drops by an unexpectedly large amount during the early part of the dive as the gas in the cylinder cools.

In mixtures of breathing gases the concentration of the individual components of the gas mix is proportional to their partial pressures and volumetric gas fraction. Gas fraction is constant for the components of a mixture, but partial pressure changes in proportion to changes in the total pressure. Partial pressure is a useful measure for expressing limits for avoiding nitrogen narcosis and oxygen toxicity. Dalton's law describes the combination of partial pressures to form the total pressure of the mixture.

Gases are highly compressible but liquids are almost incompressible. Gas spaces in the diver's body and gas held in flexible equipment contract as the diver descends and expand as the diver ascends. When constrained from free expansion and contraction, gases will exert unbalanced pressure on the walls of their containment, which can cause damage or injury known as barotrauma if excessive.

=== Solubility of gases and diffusion ===
Henry's law describes how as pressure increases the quantity of gas that can be dissolved in the tissues of the body increases. This effect is involved in nitrogen narcosis, oxygen toxicity and decompression sickness.

Concentration of gases dissolved in the body tissues affects a number of physiological processed and is influenced by diffusion rates, solubility of the components of the breathing gas in the tissues of the body and pressure. Given sufficient time under a specific pressure, tissues will saturate with the gases, and no more will be absorbed until the pressure increases. When the pressure decreases faster than the dissolved gas can be eliminated, the concentration rises and supersaturation occurs, and pre-existing bubble nuclei may grow. Bubble formation and growth in decompression sickness is affected by surface tension of the bubbles, as well as pressure changes and supersaturation.

=== Density effects ===
The density of the breathing gas is proportional to absolute pressure, and affects the breathing performance of regulators and the work of breathing, which affect the capacity of the diver to work, and in extreme cases, to breathe. Density of the water, the diver's body, and equipment, determines the diver's apparent weight in water, and therefore their buoyancy, and influences the use of buoyant equipment. Density and the force of gravity are the factors in the generation of hydrostatic pressure. Divers use high density materials such as lead for diving weighting systems and low density materials such as air in buoyancy compensators and lifting bags.

=== Viscosity effects ===
The absolute (dynamic) viscosity of water is higher (order of 100 times) than that of air. This increases the drag on an object moving through water, and more effort is required for propulsion in water than air relative to the speed of movement. Viscosity also affects the work of breathing.

=== Surface tension ===
Surface tension is a factor in the formation, growth, and elimination of gas bubbles in a liquid, and as such, relevant to bubble mechanics aspects of decompression theory.

=== Heat balance ===
Thermal conductivity of water is higher than that of air. As water conducts heat 20 times more than air, and has a much higher thermal capacity, heat transfer from a diver's body to water is faster than to air, and to avoid excessive heat loss leading to hypothermia, thermal insulation in the form of diving suits, or active heating is used. Gases used in diving have very different thermal conductivities; Heliox, and to a lesser extent, trimix, conducts heat faster than air because of the helium content, and argon conducts heat slower than air, so technical divers breathing gases containing helium may inflate their dry suits with argon. Some thermal conductivity values at 25 °C and sea level atmospheric pressure: argon: 16 mW/m/K; air: 26 mW/m/K; neoprene: 50 mW/m/K; wool felt: 70 mW/m/K; helium: 142 mW/m/K; water: 600 mW/m/K. Furthermore, thermal variations affect diving equipment; for example, a scuba cylinder's internal pressure drops when submerged in colder water.

=== Underwater vision ===
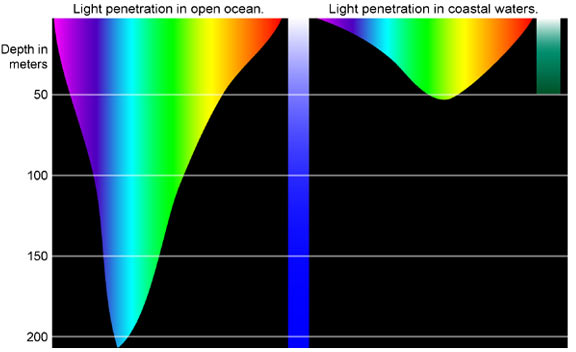
Comparison of penetration of light of different wavelengths in the open ocean and coastal waters

Underwater vision is affected by the refractive index of water, which is similar to that of the cornea of the eye, and which is about 30% greater than air. Snell's law describes the angle of refraction relative to the angle of incidence. This similarity in refractive index is the reason a diver cannot see clearly underwater without a diving mask with an internal airspace. Absorption of light depends on wavelength, this causes loss of colour underwater. The red end of the spectrum of light is absorbed over a short distance, and is lost even in shallow water. Divers use artificial light underwater to reveal these absorbed colours. In deeper water no light from the surface penetrates, and artificial lighting is necessary to see at all. Underwater vision is also affected by turbidity, which causes scattering, and dissolved materials which absorb light.

=== Underwater acoustics ===
Underwater acoustics affect the ability of the diver to hear through the hood of the diving suit or the helmet, and the ability to judge the direction of a source of sound.

== Environmental physical phenomena of interest to divers ==
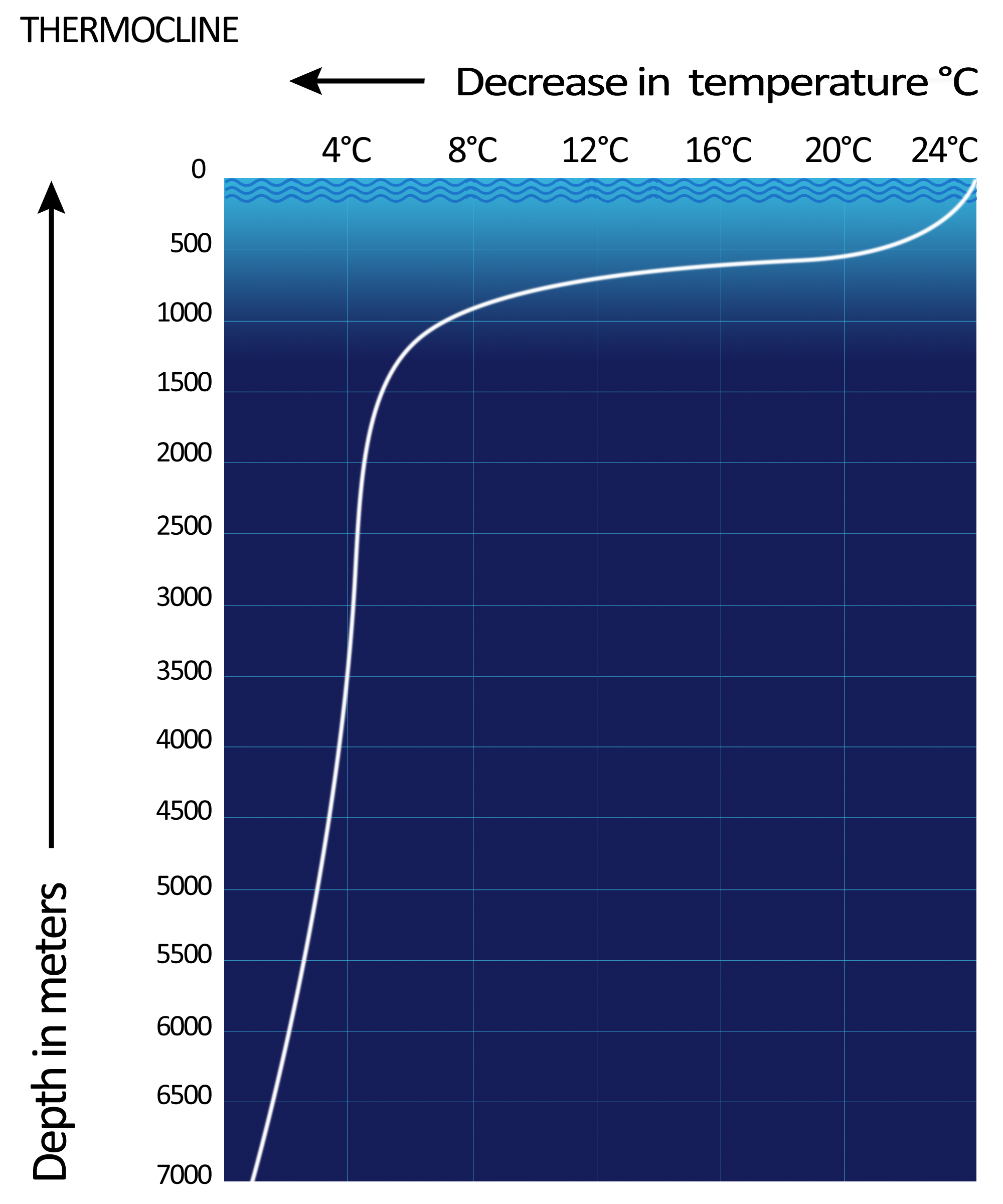
Graph showing a tropical ocean thermocline (depth vs. temperature)

The physical phenomena found in large bodies of water that may have a practical influence on divers include:

- Effects of weather such as wind, which causes waves, and changes of temperature and atmospheric pressure on and in the water. Even moderately high winds can prevent diving because of the increased risk of becoming lost at sea or injured. Low water temperatures make it necessary for divers to wear diving suits and can cause problems such as freezing of diving regulators.
- Haloclines, or strong, vertical salinity gradients. For instance, where fresh water enters the sea, the fresh water floats over the denser saline water and may not mix immediately. Sometimes visual effects, such as shimmering and reflection, occur at the boundary between the layers, because the refractive indices differ.
- Ocean currents can transport water over thousands of kilometres, and may bring water with different temperature and salinity into a region. Some ocean currents have a huge effect on local climate, for instance the warm water of the North Atlantic drift moderates the climate of the north west coast of Europe. The speed of water movement can affect dive planning and safety.
- Thermoclines, or sudden changes in temperature. Where the air temperature is higher than the water temperature, shallow water may be warmed by the air and the sunlight but deeper water remains cold resulting in a lowering of temperature as the diver descends. This temperature change may be concentrated over a small vertical interval, when it is called a thermocline.
- Where cold, fresh water enters a warmer sea the fresh water may float over the denser saline water, so the temperature rises as the diver descends.
- In lakes exposed to geothermal activity, the temperature of the deeper water may be warmer than the surface water. This will usually lead to convection currents.
- Water at near-freezing temperatures is less dense than slightly warmer water - maximum density of water is at about 4 °C - so when near freezing, water may be slightly warmer at depth than at the surface.
- Tidal currents and changes in sea level caused by gravitational forces and the Earth's rotation. Some dive sites can only be dived safely at slack water when the tidal cycle reverses and the current slows. Strong currents can cause problems for divers. Buoyancy control can be difficult when a strong current meets a vertical surface. Divers consume more breathing gas when swimming against currents. Divers on the surface can be separated from their boat cover by currents. On the other hand, drift diving is only possible when there is a reasonable current.

== See also ==
- Ambient pressure – Pressure of the surrounding medium
- Atmospheric pressure – Static pressure exerted by the weight of the Earth's atmosphere
- Buoyancy – Upward force that opposes the weight of an object immersed in fluid
- Pressure – Force distributed over an area
