= Buoyancy control =

Buoyancy control may refer to:

- Buoyancy control of scuba divers
- Buoyancy control of surface supplied divers
- The scuba diving skill of buoyancy control
- Buoyancy control of submarines
- Buoyancy control of submersibles
- Buoyancy control of airships
