= Scuba skills =

Skills required to scuba-dive safely

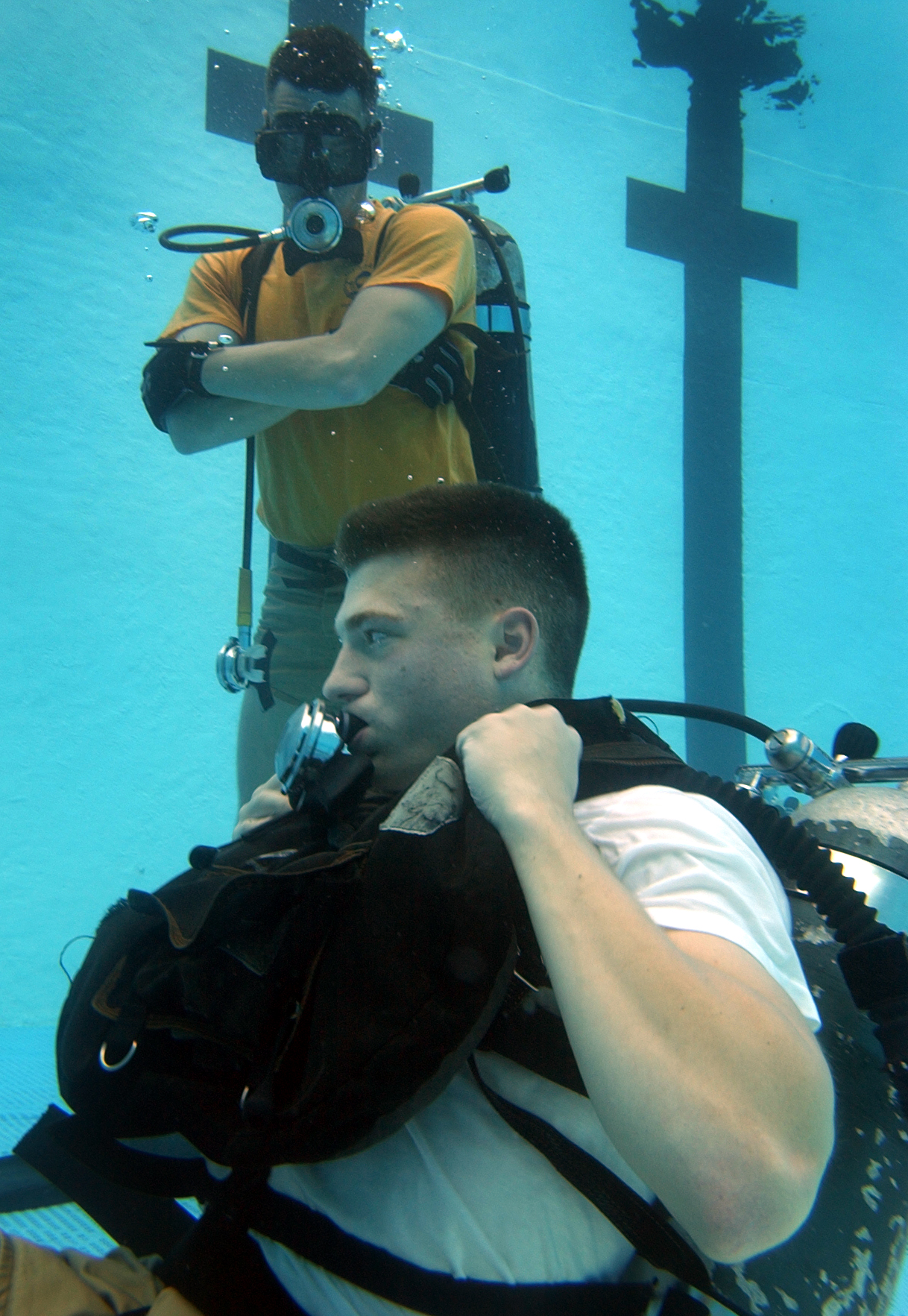
The instructor monitors a trainee practicing diving skills.

Scuba skills are skills required to dive safely using self-contained underwater breathing apparatus, known as a scuba set. Most of these skills are relevant to both open-circuit scuba and rebreather scuba, and many also apply to surface-supplied diving. Some scuba skills, which are critical to divers' safety, may require more practice than standard recreational training provides to achieve reliable competence.

Some skills are generally accepted by recreational diver certification agencies as basic and necessary in order to dive without direct supervision. Others are more advanced, although some diver certification and accreditation organizations may require these to endorse entry-level competence. Instructors assess divers on these skills during basic and advanced training. Divers are expected to remain competent at their level of certification, either by practice or through refresher courses. Some certification organizations recommend refresher training if a diver has a lapse of more than six to twelve months without a dive.

Skill categories include selection, functional testing, preparation and transport of scuba equipment, dive planning, preparation for a dive, kitting up for the dive, water entry, descent, breathing underwater, monitoring the dive profile (depth, time, and decompression status) and progress of the dive, personal breathing gas management, situational awareness, communicating with the dive team, buoyancy and trim control, mobility in the water, ascent, emergency and rescue procedures, exit from the water, removal of equipment after the dive, cleaning and preparation of equipment for storage and recording the dive, within the scope of the diver's certification.

== Basic open circuit equipment ==
=== Preparing and dressing in the diving suit ===
A scuba diver should be able to assess what type of diving exposure suit is preferable for the planned dive, to confirm that it is in safe, usable condition and the right size, and to put it on correctly. Entry-level skills usually include the use of wet suits, but in countries where the water and/or weather conditions are cold, beginners may need dry suit training. Recreational divers trained in warm tropical waters may not initially need to learn any diving suit skills. Using a dry suit safely requires special skills, including buoyancy control, inversion recovery, emergency venting, and blowup recovery.

=== Preparing the equipment ===
Divers are individually responsible for the function of their personal equipment. When diving as buddies with other divers, they are expected to familiarize themselves with the functional aspects of the buddy's equipment as well, to be able to operate it in an emergency.

==== Scuba assembly ====
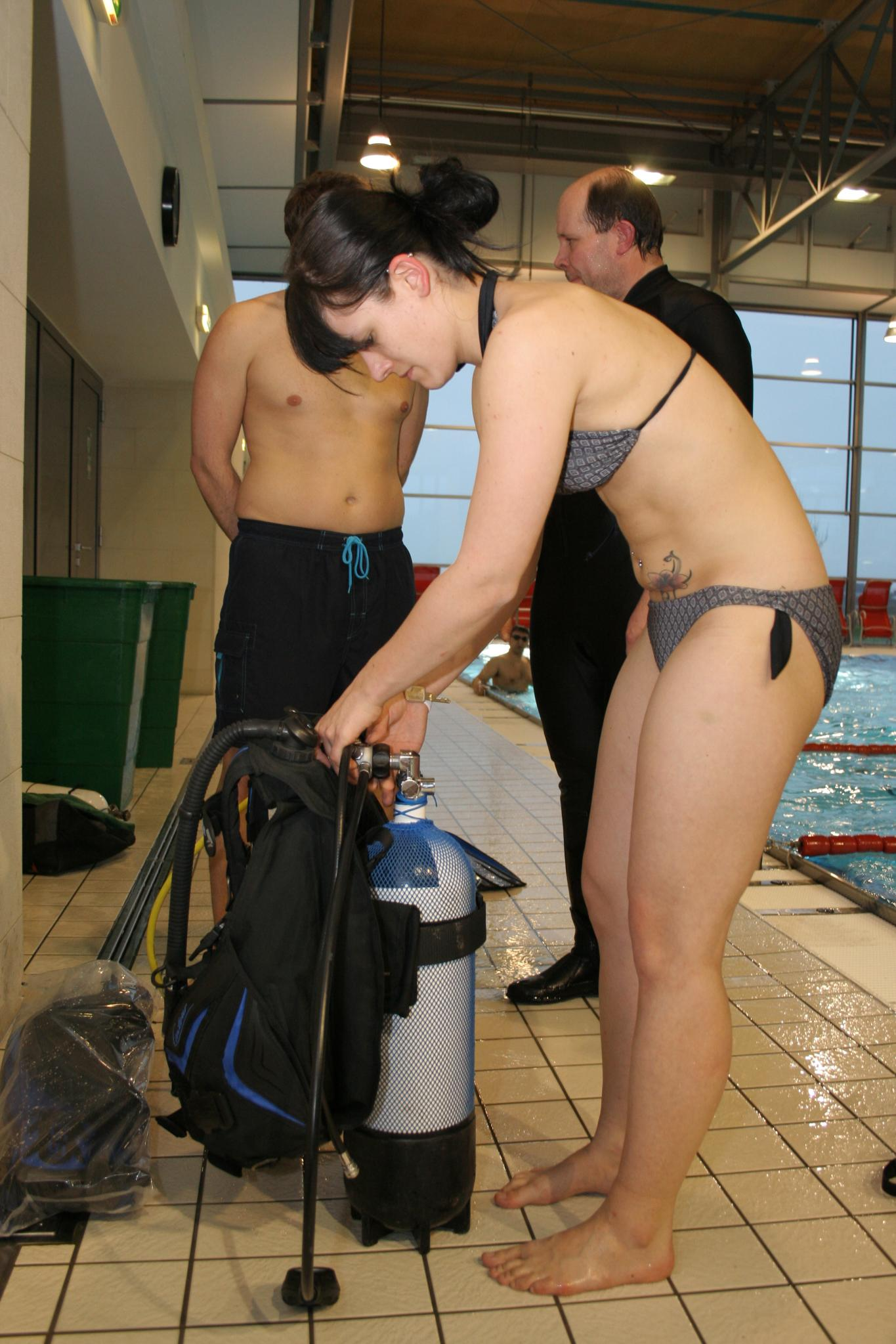
Assembly of the scuba set – connection of the regulator to the cylinder valve

The set is usually stored and transported as separate major components: harness and buoyancy compensator, cylinder(s) and regulator(s), and assembled for each use. Correct assembly and function are critical for safety and in some cases for survival. All certification agencies require all autonomous divers to be competent to assemble and test functionality of their own sets.

Scuba assembly generally entails mounting the cylinder(s) on the harness, connecting the regulator(s) to the cylinder valves, ensuring an uncontaminated and pressure-tight seal, and connecting the low-pressure hose to the buoyancy compensator inflation valve. Validating the function of the regulator and inflation valve is essential to proper scuba assembly, and always reviewed during pre-dive checks. Because there may be a significant interval between assembly and use, this check is commonly repeated just before putting the set on, and may be repeated just before descent.

==== Pre-dive checks ====
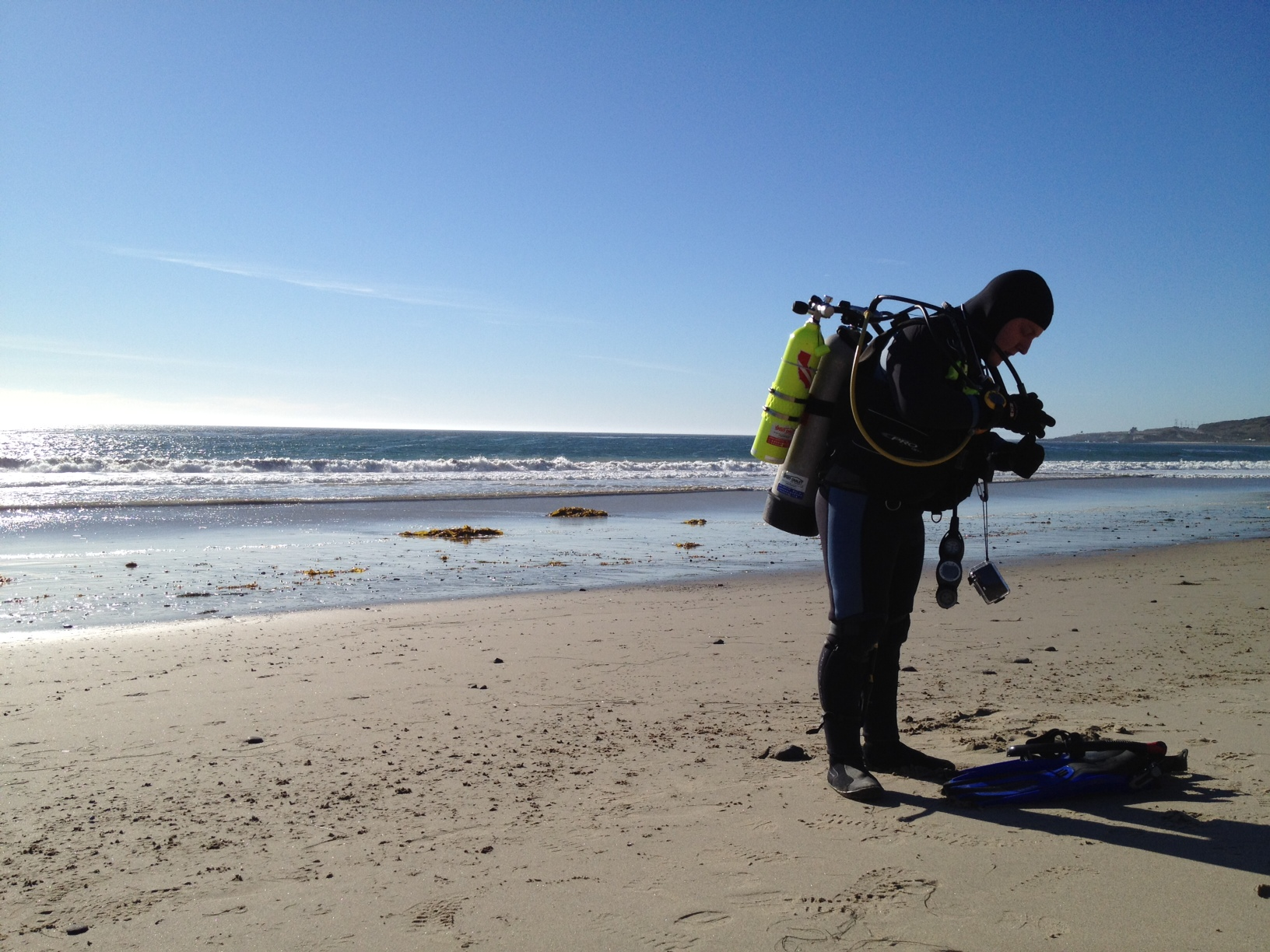
Pre-dive check before a surf entry

Pre-dive checks include equipment inspection and function testing, and review of the dive plan with the team. Such checks can reveal problems that could make it necessary to abort the dive, including some which could potentially be fatal.

Some pre-dive checks are done while donning the dive equipment. Establishing a routine for the order of donning and checking can help avoid skipping critical checks; a written checklist may be more reliable. The risk of skipping a check is increased if the process is disrupted, and it is good practice never to distract a diver unnecessarily during a check. The value of a written checklist increases with the complexity of the equipment used, and even more so if there are distractions.

For a shore entry, kitting up may be broken up into stages, with the suit, scuba set, and weights fitted at a convenient place, and the mask and fins added when entering the water. In this case, some of the equipment may be checked both when it is donned and again just before committing to the water. If a long surface swim is necessary, the scuba set function and pressure should be checked again just before descent. A swim through heavy kelp can roll the cylinder valve closed or partially closed.

Responsibility for pre-dive checks for professional divers is more complex, based on the concept of the duty of care. It is usually defined in an organizational operations manual, which may stipulate recorded checklists for the equipment in use, and norms for the participation of other diving team members.

== Entry and exit ==
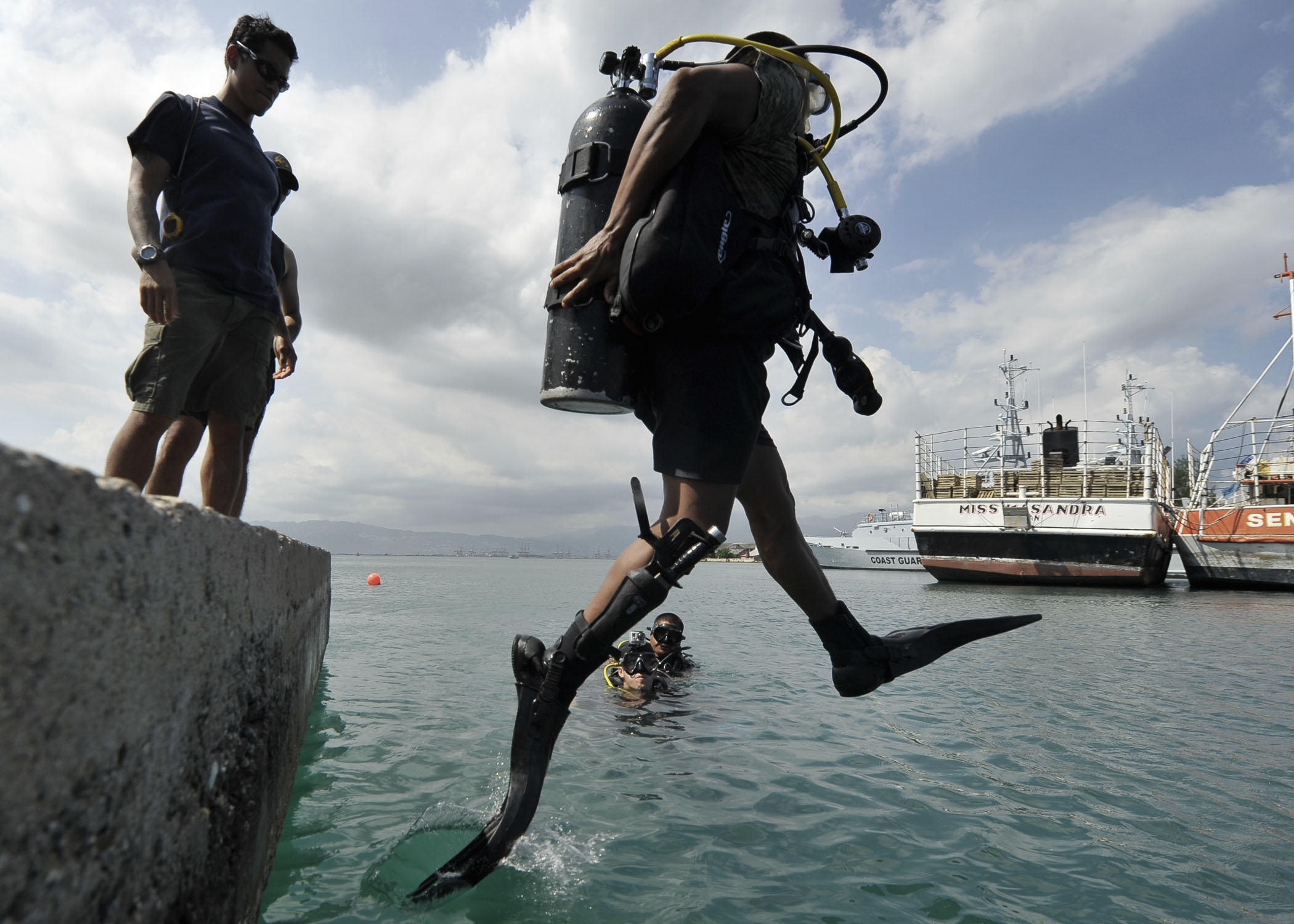
Stride entry or front step entry from a low dockside

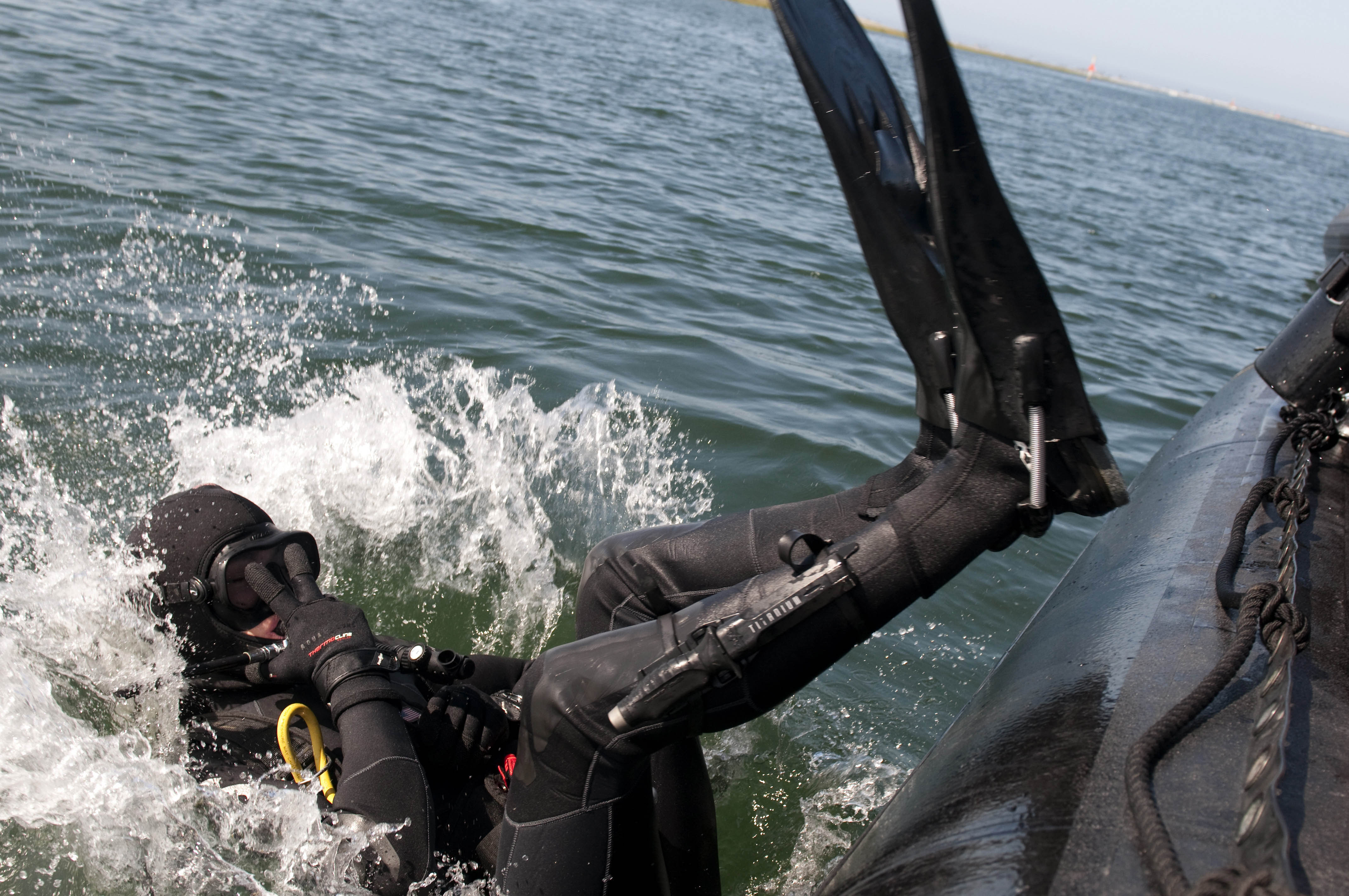
Backward roll entry from a small boat

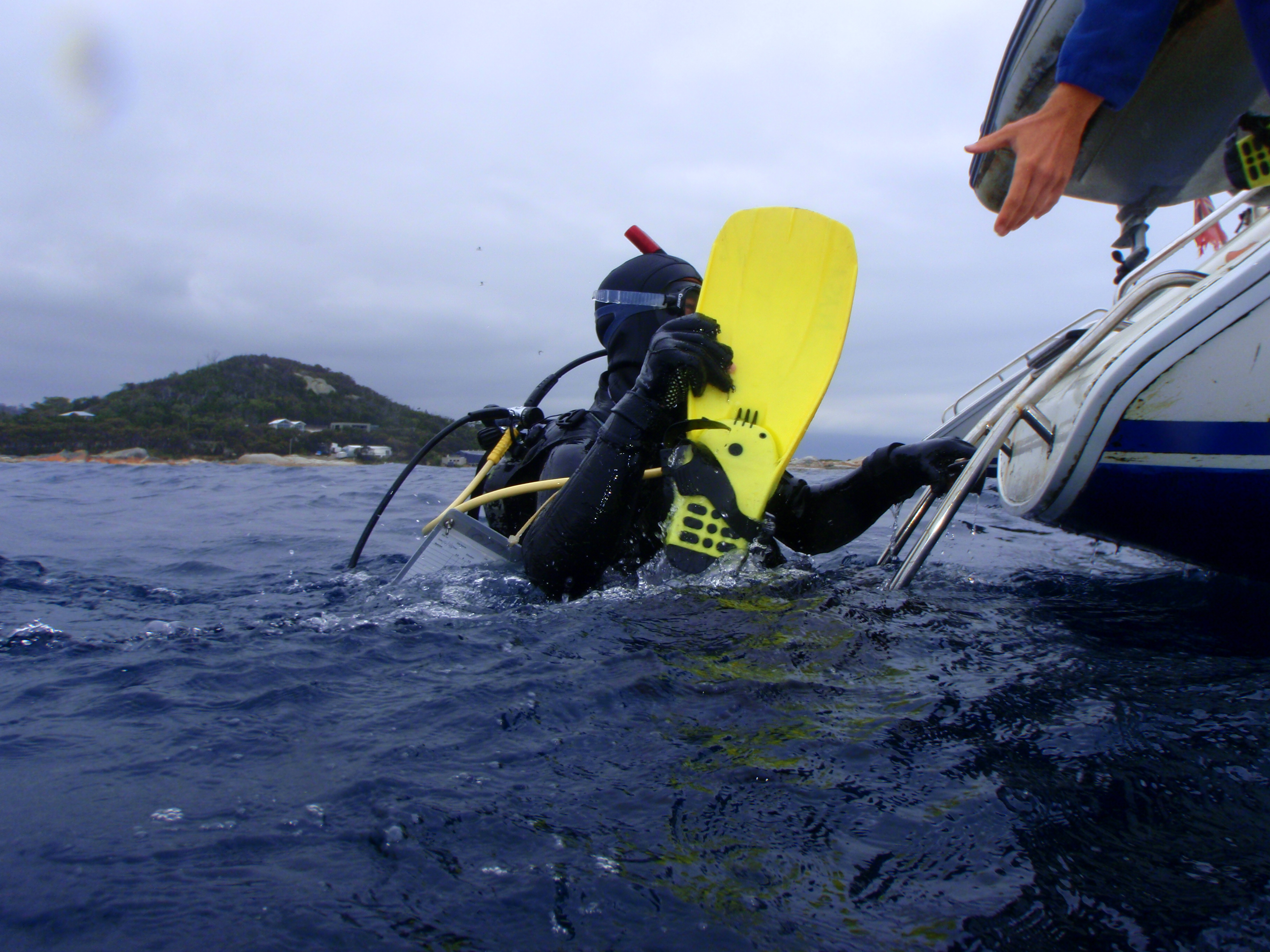
Scuba diver exiting water by stern platform ladder on a sailing catamaran

Certification standards often require a diver to be able to get in and out of the water under a range of circumstances. Divers with disabilities or who are otherwise physically unable to make a safe entry or exit are expected to be able to identify the conditions under which they need help. Then they are either to arrange for assistance, or to refrain from diving in those conditions.

Common entry and exit points include:

- Poolside.
- Small/large boat.
- Beach or rocky shoreline.
- Jetty or dockside.
- Into/out of deep water.
- Into/out of shallow water.
- Through a surf line.

=== Positive and negative entry ===
The default condition for water entry is positive buoyancy, which allows divers to pair up and make final checks before descent, and to descend together, but negative buoyancy entry is appropriate in some circumstances, for example when there is a strong surface current and a small descent target.

In negative entries the diver establishes negative buoyancy before entering the water, allowing immediate descent. Negative buoyancy is generally considered a higher-risk procedure. It requires the buoyancy compensator and dry suit to be deflated before entry, more precise control of weighting to prevent rapid uncontrolled descent, confidence in the ability to equalize the ears and sinuses during rapid descent, and the ability to control the descent rate and achieve neutral buoyancy without delay. This procedure requires all pre-dive checks to be done before entering the water, and the consequences of getting buoyancy settings wrong or neglecting a breathing gas setup check can be serious. Failing to connect inflator hoses, to zip up a dry suit, or to open the cylinder valve sufficiently can quickly lead to an emergency. Other problems can arise if the diver is too negatively buoyant and has trouble equalizing, or sinks so fast that the inflator valves cannot fill the dry suit or BCD fast enough to compensate for the compression of descent. In poor visibility, buddy pairs may lose contact right at the start of the dive.

An acceptably safe negative entry requires pre-dive checks on the regulator and BC inflation function, and a sufficiently accurate balance of BC and/or suit inflation to ballast dive weights. This becomes more complex when the diver carries large amounts of breathing gas, because the weighting must allow neutral buoyancy at the shallowest decompression stop when the gas is expended, and the diver is therefore relatively more heavily weighted at the start of the dive. The diver should be certain that the cylinder valve is fully open and the inflator hose connected. This requires testing the regulator flow, the work of breathing, and the inflation valve function immediately before entering the water. This all must be done while observing the pressure gauge, particularly if there is any possibility that anyone else has handled the valve after the set is on the diver's back. Extra care is required here because the diver may have inadvertently closed or partially closed the valve. Any movement of the gauge needle while inhaling is a warning of a partially closed valve.

=== Entries ===
Standard water entries that are generally taught to entry-level divers include:

- Stride entry: this is the standard method of entry from a standing position at a moderately low height above sufficiently deep water. The diver simply steps forward and remains upright during the short drop into the water. The fins strike the water first and reduce impact. Depth of immersion can be limited by performing a scissor kick immediately after striking the water. If an unexpected obstacle is present or the water is shallower than expected, the feet will hit it first. Because the regulator and mask are vulnerable to water impact in this entry technique, they are held in place with one hand. If the buoyancy compensator is inflated, the buoyancy and drag will limit the depth of penetration. The diver may need to quickly clear the area below the entry point so that other divers can follow when there is a large group or a current.
- Seated entry: sometimes also known as a controlled seated entry or silent entry. This technique is suitable from a platform where the diver can sit facing the water with the legs hanging into the water, such as the side of a swimming pool, a floating jetty, or the swim platform of a large boat. Seated entry requires sufficient upper-body strength to support the diver's weight on the arms while rotating to face the platform, then lowering oneself into the water in a controlled manner. Divers sit at the waterside in full equipment with both feet over the side in the water, place both hands palm down on the deck on the same side of the body, and take the body weight on straight arms as they rotate their bodies to face the platform before lowering themselves into the water.
- Backward roll: this entry is used from small boats where divers complete preparations while seated on the side of the boat with their feet on the deck and the water behind them. It is particularly suited to inflatable boats and other small, open vessels with gunwale freeboards of about half a meter or less. Falling backward into the water from this position is relatively safe and easy, and can be done simultaneously by all divers seated along the gunwale. The backward roll is suitable when the distance to the water is short, when it is safe and comfortable to sit on the side deck, tube or gunwale, and when the diver will not rotate more than about 120° during the roll. It eliminates the need to stand up and walk to an alternative entry point on a moving platform while encumbered by equipment, and it can be done with back-mount or side-mount equipment. The back-mounted diving cylinder makes first contact with the water surface, and the more sensitive mask and demand valve, and any other delicate equipment, are shielded from the initial impact by the diver's body. Care must be taken not to fall on any divers already in the water. A multiple diver backward-roll entry is usually coordinated by a crew member who voices a countdown so all divers go at the same time. All delicate and loosely fitted equipment should be held securely in place while rolling. In the case of sling- or side-mount cylinders, these should be held in place by the arms to prevent them from hitting the diver in the face. The boat should be stationary relative to the water for a multiple diver simultaneous entry. If anchored in a current, divers nearest the stern should enter before divers further forward.
- Forward roll: this is an alternate entry that can be used from a low- to moderate-height standing position. It is seldom used, however, as the risk of injury, damage, or loss of equipment is greater than for the stride entry, and it rarely offers advantages. The technique is to stand at the edge of the deck, fully kitted, with the fins beyond the foot pocket overhanging the edge. The diver holds the mask and DV with one hand and bends forward at the hips, keeping the legs straight, curls in the head, and falls forward, rotating so that the top of the back-mounted cylinder strikes the water first.
- Ladder descent entry: this is a relatively controlled and low-impact entry method. Few ladders are suitable for descending while wearing fins, so fins are usually carried over an arm or clipped to the diver, and put on once in the water. Putting fins on in the water can be tricky in a seaway or current.
- Surf and beach entries: these are often complicated by breaking waves. A small break is not usually a problem, but a wave with sufficient energy to knock a diver over is usually best avoided, or managed by going under it if it cannot be avoided. The safe limit differs from diver to diver, and it depends on the equipment used. Going under the break requires wearing the mask and fins while the diver breathes through the regulator. It is easier to walk backward through a broken wave while wearing fins, and the type and height of the break will influence the difficulty. A plunging breaker is much more difficult and dangerous than a spilling breaker for both entries and exits.
- Entry from a steep rocky shore: proper approach depends on the details of the shoreline topography, water depth, and wave action. The diver may be able to jump in fully kitted, or sit at the water's edge to fit mask and fins, and then slide or step in. In some circumstances a diver may have to climb down into the water and fit the fins in the water. It is important both to know how to time the entry to minimize the effects of waves, and to know when entry is simply unacceptably risky. Risk is related to both the skill and fitness of the diver, and the equipment being used.
- Jump entries: some agencies teach jumps from heights of 3 meters or more. Relatively high jumps require the diver to strike the water upright with overlapped fins to reduce the risk of knocking them off, while simultaneously holding loose equipment in place, particularly the mask and demand valve. Demand valves should be desensitized where possible to reduce the risk of inducing a free-flow. High-jump entries may be unsuitable for rebreathers, sidemount configurations, or those configurations where a cylinder or other equipment is mounted in a way that may allow it to swing and strike the diver when it hits the water, or where the impact may damage equipment.

=== Exits ===
Standard exit procedures include:

- Poolside exit by push up; heavy equipment is removed and placed on the poolside where possible. The scuba set is usually removed with the BC inflated and held so it does not float away. The diver places both hands on the edge of the paving, fins upwards and uses the arms to boost themself upward as far as possible before swinging round to sit, or swinging up a knee. If this is not possible, subsiding the upper torso onto the pool deck, swinging up a knee to roll over and sit or scramble up on hands and knees. Elegance of the maneuver much depends on arm strength. This is the same method used by ordinary swimmers, but the fins help with the initial boost.
- Pool exit by ladder. Heavy equipment may be removed or left on as the diver prefers. Fins must be removed to use the ladder rungs. If the weight is kept close to the ladder the load on the arms from leaning backwards is reduced.
- Small boat (over the side): heavy equipment is usually removed first and pulled onto the boat by a person onboard. Fins are commonly left on to help boost the diver out of the water. Depending on the height and shape of the boat topsides, the presence and type of handholds, and the skill and strength of the diver, it may be possible to climb out unaided, but one or more people on the boat may need to help haul the diver in over the side.
- Large boat or jetty (ladder): this may require divers to remove their fins first. Fins may then be passed up to someone on the boat, clipped off to each diver, carried hanging over the wrists by the straps, lifted on board in a net or basket, or clipped to a rope with other gear. Depending on the circumstances, such as climb height and equipment weight, divers may remove other equipment and pass or send it up, or climb the ladder while wearing it. The procedure may be complicated by motion of the boat, waves, or current, as divers may have difficulty getting back to the ladder if they drift away after removing their fins.
- Jetty steps. The fins are removed, the diver stands up and walks up the stairs.
- Beach exit. The method must be adapted to the conditions. Surf size and power, slope of beach and material of the beach influence the choice of method.
- Rocky shore exits. The exit point mus be chosen carefully, and the exit timed to suit the wave sets. In all cases it is desirable to clear the swash zone as quickly as possible to avoid being hit by a large following wave while half immersed, and either cast up in the rocks, or dragged back in by the backwash.

== Breathing from the demand valve ==
This must be done correctly to make effective use of limited air supply, and to avoid drowning. Most recreational scuba diving is done with a half mask, so the demand valve is held in the mouth, gripped by the teeth, and sealed by the lips. Over a long dive this can induce jaw fatigue, and for some people a gag reflex. Various mouthpiece styles are available off the shelf or as customized items, and one of them may work better if either of these problems occurs. The diver inhales and exhales through the mouth, and must be able to seal off the nasal passages from the pharynx so that breathing remains possible with a flooded or dislodged mask. Under most circumstances, scuba breathing differs little from surface breathing. A full-face mask may allow the diver to breathe through the nose or mouth as preferred.

The demand valve adds a little respiratory dead space to the airway. The work of breathing is greater due to hydrostatic pressure differences between the depth of the demand valve and the lungs, and due to cracking pressure and flow resistance in the demand valve. These factors make a slow and deep breathing cycle more energy efficient and more effective at carbon dioxide elimination. Part of the skill of diving is learning to relax under water and breathe more slowly and deeply, while minimizing exertion, by learning good buoyancy, trim, maneuvering, and propulsion skills. Breathing too slowly or too shallowly does not ventilate the lungs sufficiently, and risks hypercapnia (carbon dioxide buildup). Breathing effort increases with depth, as density and friction increase in proportion to the increase in pressure. In the extreme case, all of a diver's available energy may be spent on breathing, leaving none for other purposes. This may cause carbon dioxide buildup. If this cycle is not broken, panic and drowning may follow. The use of a low-density inert gas, typically helium, in the breathing mixture can reduce this problem, while diluting the narcotic effects of the other gases.

Scuba divers are typically taught not to hold their breath underwater, as in some circumstances this can result in lung overpressure injury. This is a risk only during ascent, when air expands in the lungs. During ascent the airways must remain open. Holding the breath at a constant depth for short periods with a normal lung volume is generally harmless, as long as there is sufficient ventilation on average to prevent carbon dioxide buildup. In fact, this is a standard practice among underwater photographers using open circuit scuba, to avoid startling fish or other subjects with regulator noise. Breath-holding during descent can eventually cause lung squeeze, and it may also allow the diver to miss warning signs of a breathing-gas supply malfunction until it is too late to correct it.

Skilled open-circuit divers make small adjustments to buoyancy by adjusting their average lung volume during their breathing cycles. This adjustment is generally in the order of a litre of gas, and can be maintained for a moderate period, although it is more comfortable to adjust the volume of the buoyancy compensator over longer periods.

The practice of shallow breathing or skip breathing should be avoided, as it may cause carbon dioxide buildup, which can result in headaches and a reduced capacity to recover from a breathing gas supply emergency. It is not an efficient method to conserve breathing gas.

The skills appropriate to single- and twin-hose scuba regulators differ enough that they require relearning for a change from one to the other, but twin-hose open circuit is obsolete, and single-hose skills are portable between models.

=== Demand-valve clearing and recovery ===
Divers may remove their demand valves from their mouths under water for several reasons, both intentionally and unintentionally. In all cases, the casing may fill with water that must be removed before the diver can breathe again. This is known as clearing or purging the demand valve. The two clearing techniques for single hose regulators are:

- Exhaling through the demand valve with the exhaust valve at the low point displaces the water with exhaled gas. Normal exhalation clears the demand valve with each exhalation, provided that no parts of the internal volume are below the exhaust valve.
- Blocking the mouthpiece (usually with the tongue) and pressing the purge button displaces the water with gas from the cylinder. If the exhaust valve is at the low point, the water will flow out through the valve. This method is more appropriate if the diver does not have sufficient breath left to clear by exhalation, as it consumes significant breathing gas, particularly when done frequently.

Divers may become nauseous and vomit underwater. Vomit left inside the DV must be cleared before breathing can resume. In this case it is usual to remove the DV from the mouth, flood it to rinse, and clear using the purge button. The process may be repeated as necessary. If the DV breathes wet after purging, something may be stuck in the exhaust valve. Flooding the DV and clearing again with the mouthpiece blocked usually clears the exhaust valve.

If the DV is dislodged from the diver's mouth unintentionally, it may end up in a place out of view of the diver. Three or more methods aid recovery:

- The reach method, (or hose trace method), works in all cases where the DV is not snagged. The diver reaches back over the right shoulder to the hose feeding the DV, loops thumb and fingers round the hose, then slides the hand along the hose, pulling it forward and over the shoulder until the DV arrives in the right hand, after which it can be placed in the mouth.
- The sweep method is quick and works in the common scenario in which the DV drops down on the diver's right side, while still draped over the right shoulder. In this situation the diver is usually between face down and upright, and sweeps the right hand across the waist from left to right, and around to the back, remaining in contact with the body or scuba set. Reaching as far back as possible, the diver then straightens the arm backwards and swings it around outwards and forwards in an arc until it is pointing forwards. This captures the hose, moving it where the left hand can find it by sweeping along the arm from the right hand to the neck. This method fails if the DV is on the left side of the cylinder.
- The inversion method works best when the DV has swung over to the left side of the cylinder behind the diver's back. The diver simply rolls forward into a head-down position, with the body near vertical, and relies on gravity to bring the DV down to where it can be captured.

If the diver has difficulty locating the demand valve by these methods, the octopus DV or bailout set can be used in the interim. Occasionally the DV gets snagged in such a way that it cannot be easily recovered. In some cases it may be prudent to abort the dive and surface, but this may not be practicable and it may be necessary to remove the harness partially or completely to recover the primary, after which the harness can be readjusted. A dive buddy can usually find the DV easily. If the DV cannot be reached, it is prudent to terminate the dive, as a free-flow could empty the cylinder in minutes.

== Mask clearing ==
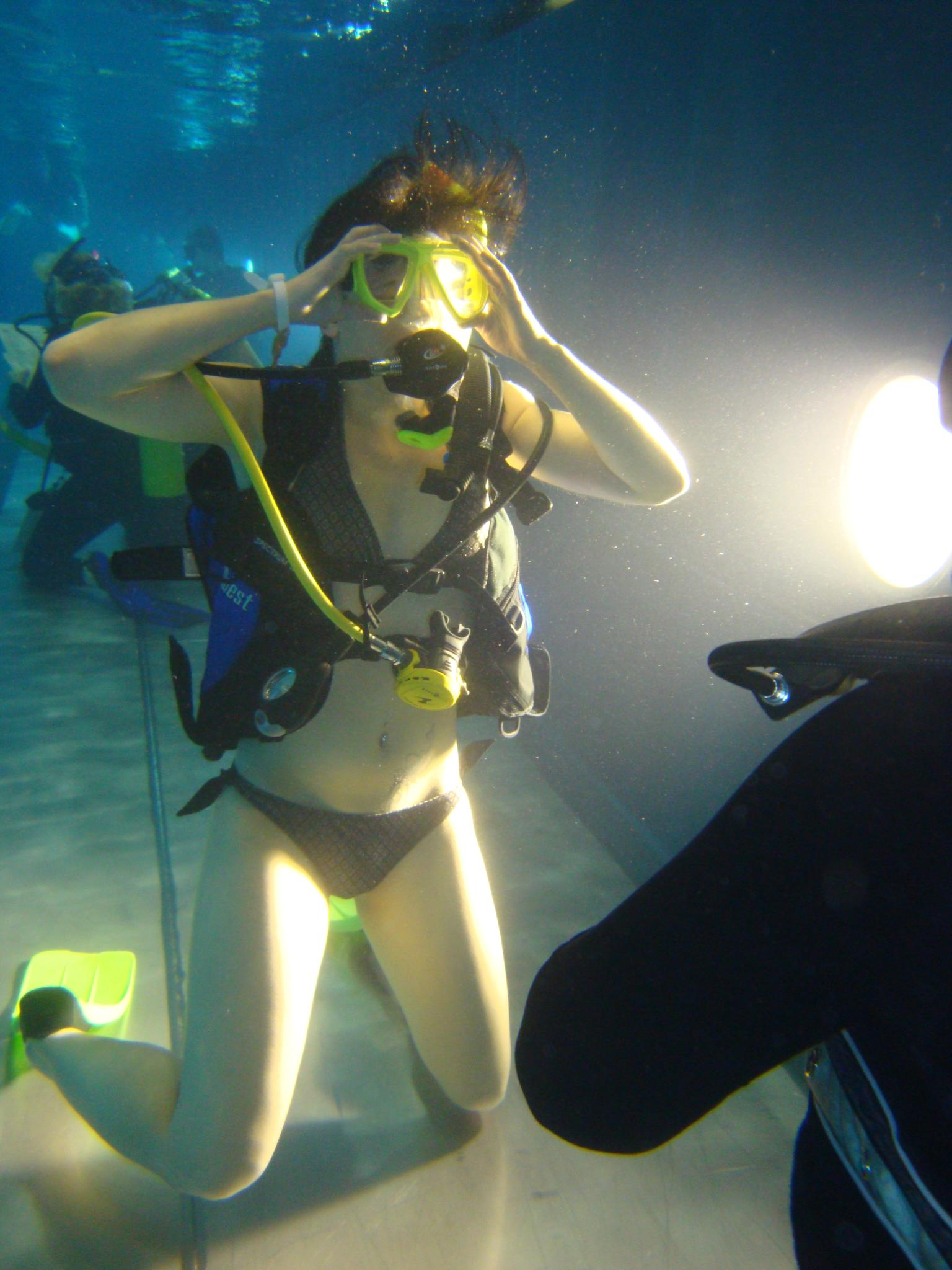
Practicing mask clearing during entry level training

Water commonly leaks into the mask. This can interfere with clear vision, requiring the diver to flush it out. Reasons for leakage include poor fit, stray hair breaking the seal, facial muscle movement that causes temporary leaks, or the impact of external objects against the mask. Most diving masks can fog up due to condensation on the inside of the faceplate. This is avoided by applying an anti-fog surfactant to the inner surface before the dive. Otherwise, the diver can deliberately flood the mask slightly to rinse off the droplets, and then clear the mask.

=== Half mask ===
This is a mask not directly connected to the air supply. The only available source of air to displace the water is the diver's nose. The procedure involves exhaling through the nose into the mask until the water has been displaced by air. During this process, the air must be prevented from escaping at a high point, or the water will not be expelled. If the mask does not fit in such a way that the top of the skirt remains sealed, the diver must press the upper part against the face. A half mask is held in place by a single strap, which though generally reliable and easy to inspect, has been known to fail. The skills are portable between models.

=== Full-face mask ===
The procedure for clearing these depends on the construction, as several types exist. In models that use an internal mouthpiece, the procedure is the same as with a half mask. Other models automatically drain through the exhaust port of the demand valve, provided the water can get to it. Models that use an oral/nasal internal seal usually drain to the demand valve or an additional drain valve at a low point when the diver's face is roughly upright or face down, and these clear during normal breathing for small leaks. They may be cleared of major flooding by using the DV's purge button to fill the mask with air.

== Buoyancy control, trim and stability ==
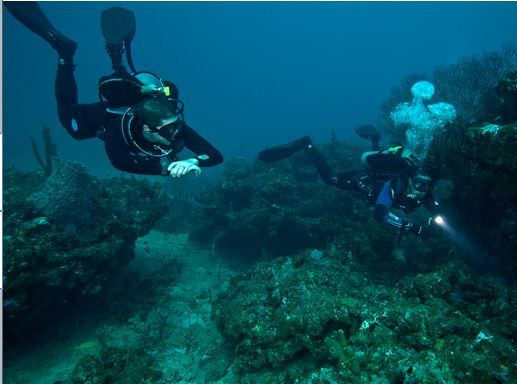
Good trim and buoyancy control

=== Buoyancy control ===
The diver needs to be able to establish three states of buoyancy at different stages of a dive, using weights and a buoyancy compensator to control buoyancy.

Weighting is the first stage of buoyancy control. The diver must be able to achieve neutral buoyancy at all stages of the dive. Buoyancy is generally controlled by adding gas to variable volume equipment (BCD and dry suit), but weighting is constant throughout a normal dive, and is only jettisoned in an emergency. The condition of lowest total diver weight is when the breathing gas has almost been used up, at the end of the dive, when it may be critical for the diver to remain at a shallow decompression stop depth. If there is any reasonable possibility of needing to stop for decompression during the ascent, the diver's safety depends on being able to maintain neutral buoyancy at that depth, so correct weighting for a dive requires enough weight to allow neutral buoyancy at the shallowest stop, and slightly above it, with almost empty gas reserves, and air in the lungs. Any more weight just makes buoyancy control during the dive more difficult, less is unsafe.

In the water the diver adjusts the BC's volume to increase or decrease buoyancy, in response to various effects that alter the diver's overall density.

- Negative buoyancy: to descend or settle on the bottom.
- Neutral buoyancy: when the diver wants to remain at a constant depth.
- Positive buoyancy: when the diver wants to float on the surface. A small amount of positive buoyancy may be used to ascend, but the diver must monitor it constantly and vigilantly to keep from ascending too quickly. To achieve negative buoyancy, divers may need to carry supplemental weights to counteract any excess buoyancy.

Neutral buoyancy matches the average density of the diver and equipment to that of the water. This is achieved by increasing buoyancy when the diver is too heavy, usually by adding gas to the BC, or decreasing buoyancy when the diver is too light, usually by venting gas from the BC. Any uncompensated change in depth from a position of neutrality changes the buoyancy, making buoyancy control a continuous procedure—the diving equivalent of balance, in a positive feedback environment. Neutral buoyancy is an unstable condition; any deviation tends to increase until corrected by the diver, and the degree of instability is proportional to the volume of compressible material on the diver, which includes the air in the lungs, diving suit, and buoyancy compensator. To minimise this instability the amount of gas needed to attain neutral buoyancy must be minimised, which implies minimum excess weighting.

It is always necessary to vent gas during ascent to maintain neutral or a small amount of positive buoyancy and control the ascent. Similarly, during a descent, gas must repeatedly or continuously be added to prevent a runaway descent.

Buoyancy control compensates for changes of volume of the diving suit with changes of depth, and changes of mass due to using up the breathing gas.

=== Trim ===
Diver trim is the orientation and posture of the body in the water, determined by the distribution of weight and buoyancy along the body as well as by the other forces acting on the diver. The stability and static trim of a scuba diver are important both at the surface and under water. Divers must maintain trim under water at neutral buoyancy, while they must hold surface trim at positive buoyancy.

When the BC is inflated at the surface to provide positive buoyancy, the centre of buoyancy and centre of gravity of the diver are generally at different places. The vertical and horizontal separation of these centroids determines the static trim. The diver can usually overcome the trimming moment of buoyancy, which requires directed effort. The diver can adjust trim to suit circumstances such as swimming face down or face up, or remaining vertical. The diver's center of gravity is determined by the distribution of weight, and buoyancy is determined by the equipment in use, particularly supplemental weights and the buoyancy compensator, which can significantly influence the position of the centre of buoyancy as it is inflated and deflated. Stable trim implies that the centre of buoyancy is directly above the centre of gravity. Any horizontal offset generates a moment that rotates the diver until the equilibrium condition is restored.

In almost all cases, the center of buoyancy with an inflated BC is nearer the head than the center of gravity, and BCs are designed to provide this as the default condition, as an inverted diver floating at the surface is at risk of drowning. The offset in the forward/backward axis is quite frequently significant, and is usually the dominant factor in determining static trim. At the surface it is generally undesirable to be trimmed strongly face down, but it is useful to be able to trim face down at will. Vertical trim is acceptable providing it can be overcome for swimming.

Underwater trim is the diver's attitude (orientation) in the water, in terms of balance and alignment with the direction of motion. The free-swimming diver may need to trim erect or inverted at times, but in general, a horizontal trim has advantages both for reduction of drag when swimming horizontally, and for observing the bottom. A slightly head-down horizontal trim allows the diver to direct propulsive thrust from the fins directly to the rear, which minimizes disturbance of sediments on the bottom, and reduces the risk of striking delicate benthic organisms with the fins. A stable horizontal trim requires the diver's center of gravity to be directly below the center of buoyancy (the centroid). Divers can compensate small errors fairly easily, but large offsets may make it necessary for the diver to constantly exert significant effort towards maintaining the desired attitude. The position of the center of buoyancy is largely beyond the diver's control, though the cylinder(s) may be shifted in the harness by a small amount, and the volume of the BC has a large influence when inflated. Most of the control of trim available to the diver is in the positioning of ballast weights. Divers can fine tune trim by placing smaller weights along the body length to bring the center of gravity to the desired position.

== Mobility and maneuvering ==
The scuba diver usually uses legs and fins to move in the water, rarely but occasionally walking on the bottom as circumstances require. Divers occasionally use hands to grasp solid objects and remain in position in a current, but a competent diver generally does not use hands for propulsion or maneuvering, as hands are often needed for other purposes while finning. Techniques for effective propulsion using fins include:

- Flutter kick and modified flutter kick: flutter kick, the most common one. In its basic form it resembles the flutter kick of surface swimmers, but slower and with a larger stroke to make effective use of the fins' large surface area. The modified flutter kick is done with bent knees, pushing water up and behind the diver to avoid stirring up sediment.
- Scissor kick: scissor kick is an asymmetrical stroke also known as split kick. It is similar to the side kick, but with the diver trimmed face downward. It combines characteristics of the flutter kick, where the stroke is up and down, and the frog kick, where the closing part of the stroke generates the most power. At the surface the diver can use the same action rotated 90° as a side kick. This is a powerful thruster, but not very fast.
- Frog kick and modified frog kick: this mimics a frog's swimming action, or a breaststroke kick. Both legs operate together to produce thrust which is directed more consistently backwards than in the flutter kick. It is suitable for finning near a soft, silty bottom, as it is less likely to stir up silt and degrade visibility. Divers do this with bent knees, and though less powerful, it produces almost no down-thrust. Divers often use it in cave diving and wreck diving where silt out can cause dramatic losses in visibility, and may compromise a divers' ability to exit.
- Dolphin kick: The diver keeps both feet together and moves them up and down. This is the only stroke possible with a monofin, and can be effective for the skilled practitioner. It uses muscles of the back and abdomen, and is not good for precise maneuvering.

Techniques for maneuvering using fins include:

- Reverse, back, or backward kick. This advanced skill is the only method of finning which moves the diver backward, pulling along the main body axis. This is probably the most difficult, and is not suited to some styles of fin. Each stroke starts with the legs extended backward at full stretch, heels together and toes pointed. The power stroke flexes the feet to extend the fins sideways, with feet splayed outward as much as possible. Feet remain close to right angles to the legs, and the diver pulls the fins toward the body by flexing the legs at the knees and hips in a motion that propels the diver backward. Part of the thrust is due to flow across the width of the fins, as they are swept outward and forward. The diver then points the fins backwards to reduce drag, puts heels together, and extends legs to the start position. Fairly stiff, wide-bladed fins are reputed to be most suitable for this stroke, which generally produces little thrust for the effort expended.
- Helicopter turn: rotation around a vertical axis. The diver bends the knees so that the fins are approximately in line with, but raised slightly above, the body axis. Ankle movements are used to scull the water sideways. The diver rotates the fin to maximize the sideways projected area, and then uses a combination of rotation of the lower leg and knee to produce a sideways thrust. The diver feathers the fin to reduce drag for the return stroke. Thrust away from the centerline is more effective for most divers.

Most of these skills are trivially portable among various fin models, with the exception of back kick, which may not work with soft and flexible fins, and finning techniques which require relative movement of the feet, which do not work with monofins.

== Ascents and descents ==
Ascent and descent are the phases of a dive where ambient pressure changes, and this comes with hazards. Direct hazards include barotrauma, while indirect hazards include buoyancy instability and the physiological effects of changes in gas solubility. The main risk is bubble formation from supersaturated inert gas in body tissues, known as decompression sickness. The skill of equalization is essential to avoid injury during both activities.

=== Descent ===
Uncompensated pressure differences between the increasing ambient pressure and the internal pressure of gas-filled spaces of the diver's body and equipment can cause barotrauma of descent. Buoyancy control and descent rate are fairly straightforward in practice. Divers must control descent rate by adjusting the volume of gas in the buoyancy compensator and, if worn, the dry suit. They must be able to limit descent rates to match the ability to equalize, particularly the ears and sinuses, and must be able to stop any descent quickly without going into an uncontrolled ascent. In most cases the bottom provides a physical limit to descent, but this is not always the case, as in wall diving or blue-water diving. A competent diver can stop at a desired depth or distance above the bottom, adjust to neutral buoyancy, trim level, and proceed with the dive.

=== Ascent ===
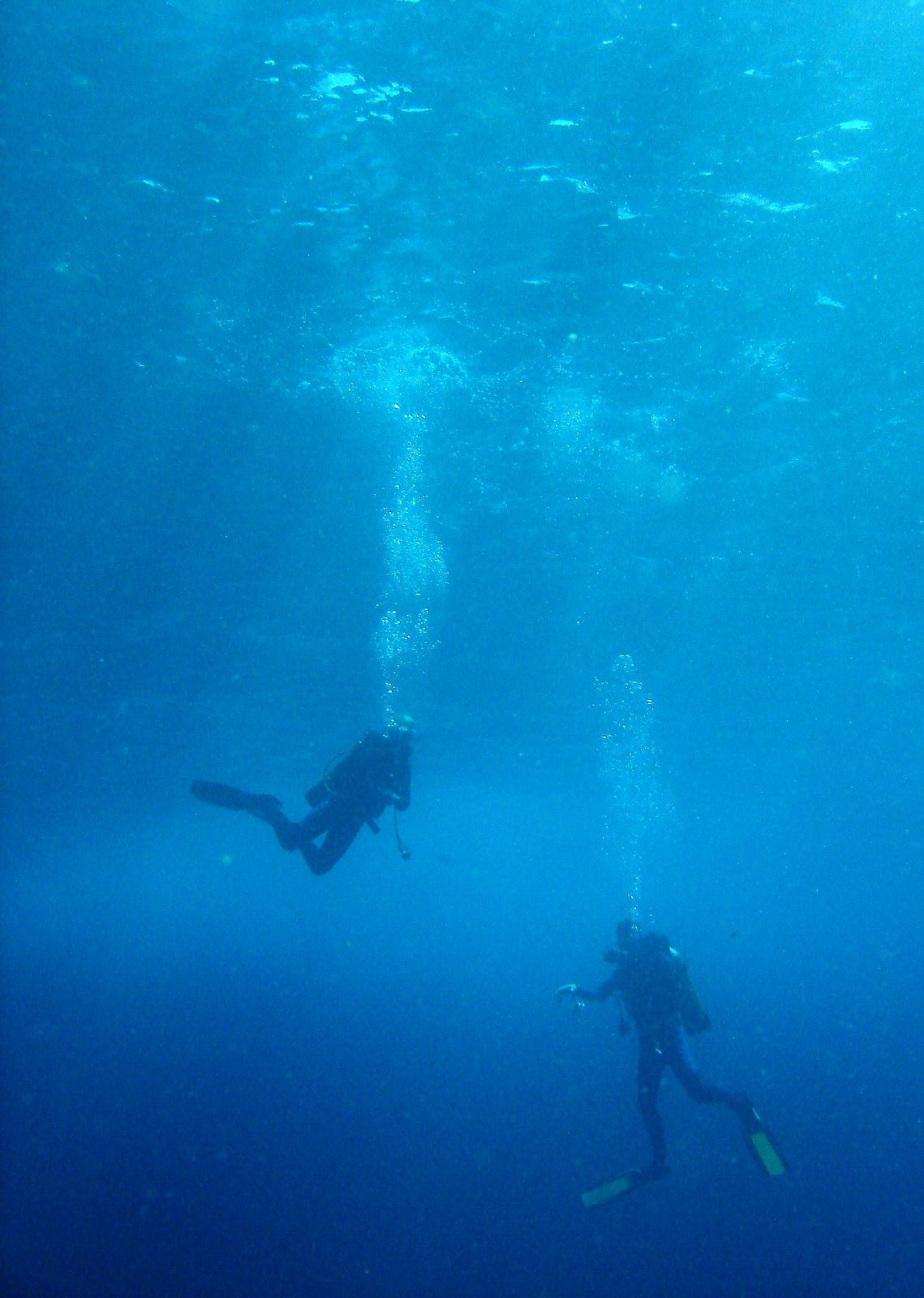
Safety stop during ascent

The pressure reductions due to ascent can also cause barotrauma. Sinuses, lungs and ears are most vulnerable, although they normally equalize automatically during ascent. Problems may arise in the middle ear if eustachian tubes become blocked. Lungs can be injured if a diver forcibly holds their breath during ascent, which can occur during an emergency free ascent when panicked, or a rapid uncontrolled ascent. Because lung over-expansion is potentially life-threatening, entry-level diver training emphasizes learning not to hold the breath, and to exhale slowly and continuously during emergency ascents. Divers learn to clear blocked eustachian tubes during ascent at the start of entry-level training.

Uncontrolled ascent can increase risk of decompression sickness and lung over-expansion injury even when diving within the no-stop limits of the decompression tables. All entry-level training includes skills of controlling buoyancy during ascent, but certification agencies differ in the criteria they use to assess competence. Most require divers to be able to limit ascent rates and achieve neutral buoyancy at a specified depth during ascents without significantly overshooting the target depth. Divers must do this using only a depth gauge or dive computer for reference, but this is a skill that usually requires more practice than recreational, entry-level training provides. Divers must vent the buoyancy compensator and dry suit at a rate that provides near neutral buoyancy at all stages of the ascent. A slightly positive buoyancy may be used to assist ascent, and neutral buoyancy to stop.

Most dry suits are fitted with an automatic dump valve, which divers can adjust to provide an approximately constant volume of gas in the suit during ascent. This allows a diver to concentrate on controlling ascent rate via the buoyancy compensator. These skills become critical in decompression stops, and even divers with excellent buoyancy control use aids to reduce risk. Shot lines are used at all levels of diving, and are in common use during entry-level training as a visual aid to ascent rate and depth control, and as a fallback physical aid. Typically only advanced recreational divers learn to deploy and use surface marker buoys and decompression buoys but professional divers consider these entry level skills. Use of a physical depth and ascent rate limiter is recognised as a safety enhancement, but the skills of an unaided midwater ascent are part of basic scuba diving competence. When a decompression buoy is used to control rate of ascent, a slight negative buoyancy helps keep an appropriate tension in the line, which holds the buoy upright for better visibility, and reduces entanglement risk. The diver can estimate and control ascent rate by the rate of winding in the line. Slack line is an entanglement hazard, and entanglement may prevent controlled ascent if the diver cannot wind in the line effectively. Assistance may be needed to disentangle thin lines if they snag on equipment that the diver cannot see and reach, and cutting free in an emergency may leave the diver's position unmarked.

Two major causes of excessive ascent rate and uncontrolled ascents are too little ballast weight, where the diver cannot achieve neutral buoyancy at the end of a dive, and floats to the surface, and too much ballast weight, where the diver has difficulty in maintaining neutral buoyancy with a large volume of gas in the buoyancy compensator, which is very sensitive to depth changes.

=== Equalizing ===
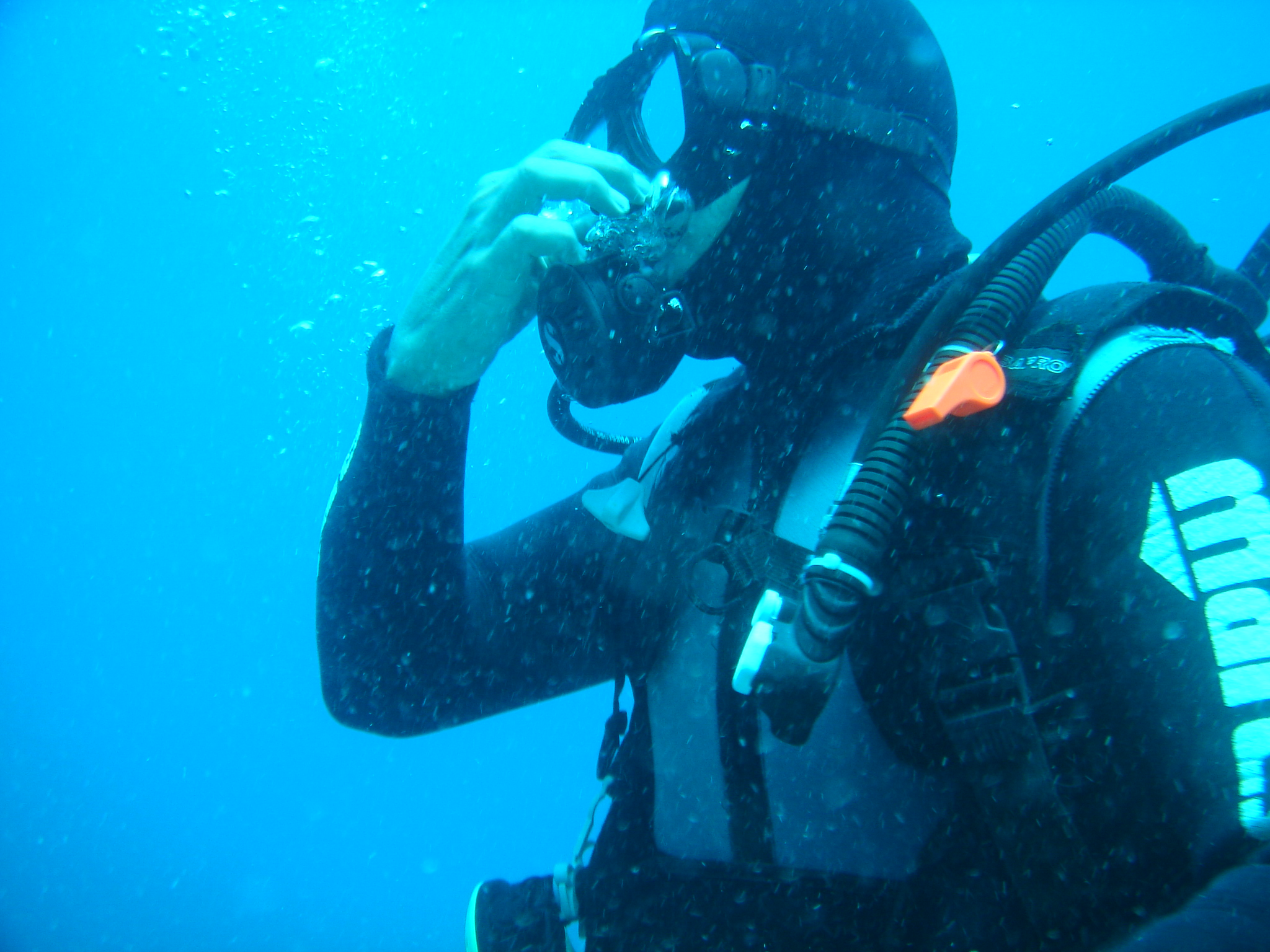
Clearing the ears on descent

During ascent and descent, gas spaces in both diver and equipment undergo pressure changes that cause the gas to expand or compress, possibly causing damage. Some spaces, such as the mask, release excess gas when pressure breaks the seal to the face, but have to be equalized during compression to avoid mask squeeze. Others, such as the buoyancy compensator bladder, expand until the over-pressure valve opens. The ears usually vent naturally through the eustachian tubes, unless they are blocked. During descent they do not typically equalize automatically, so the diver must equalize deliberately.

== Communications ==
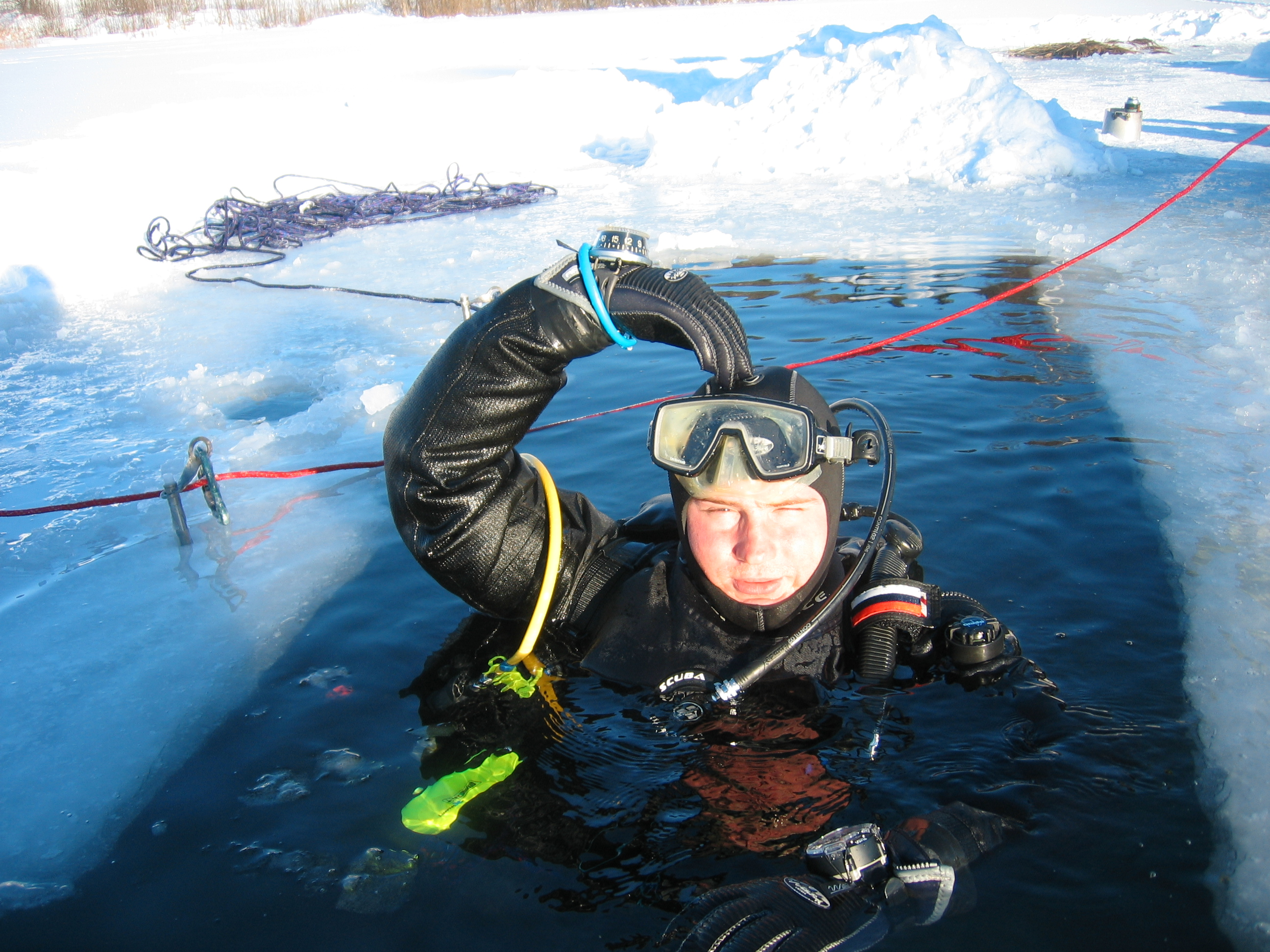
One way to signal "I'm OK" at the surface

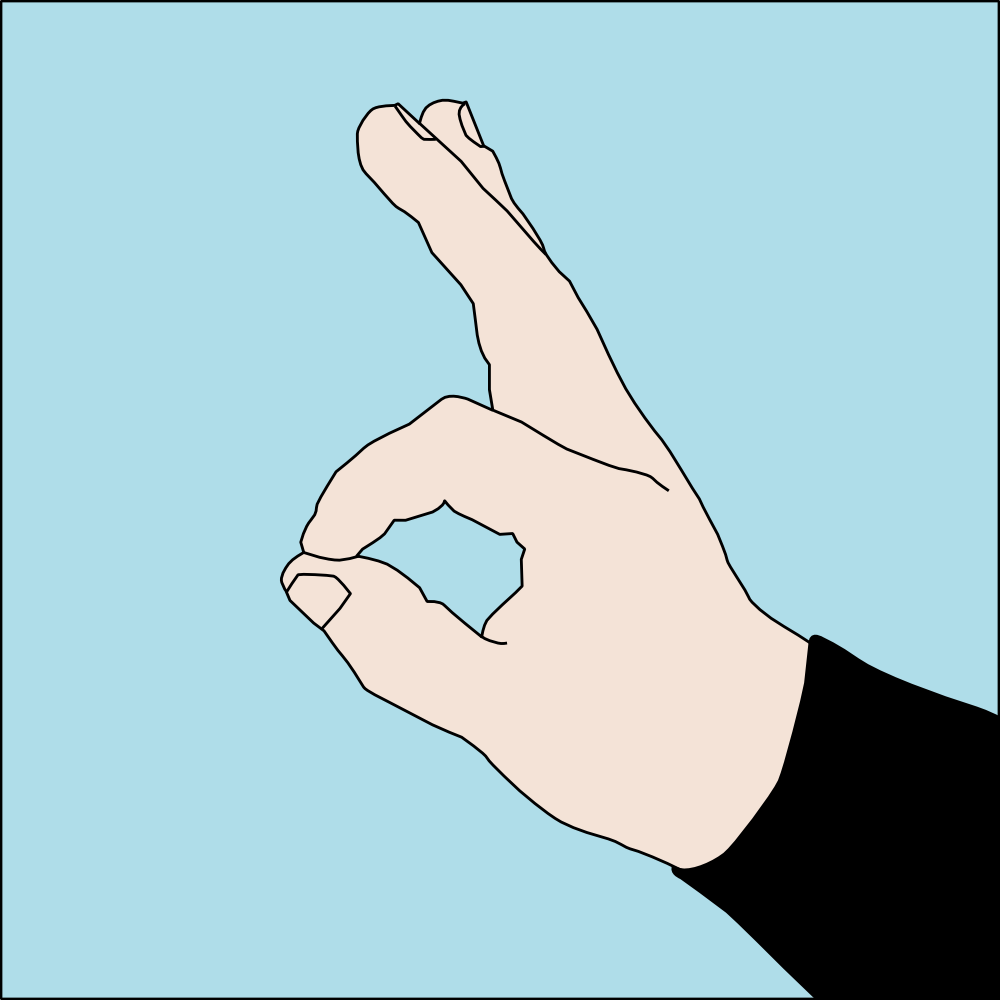
Are you OK? or I am OK!

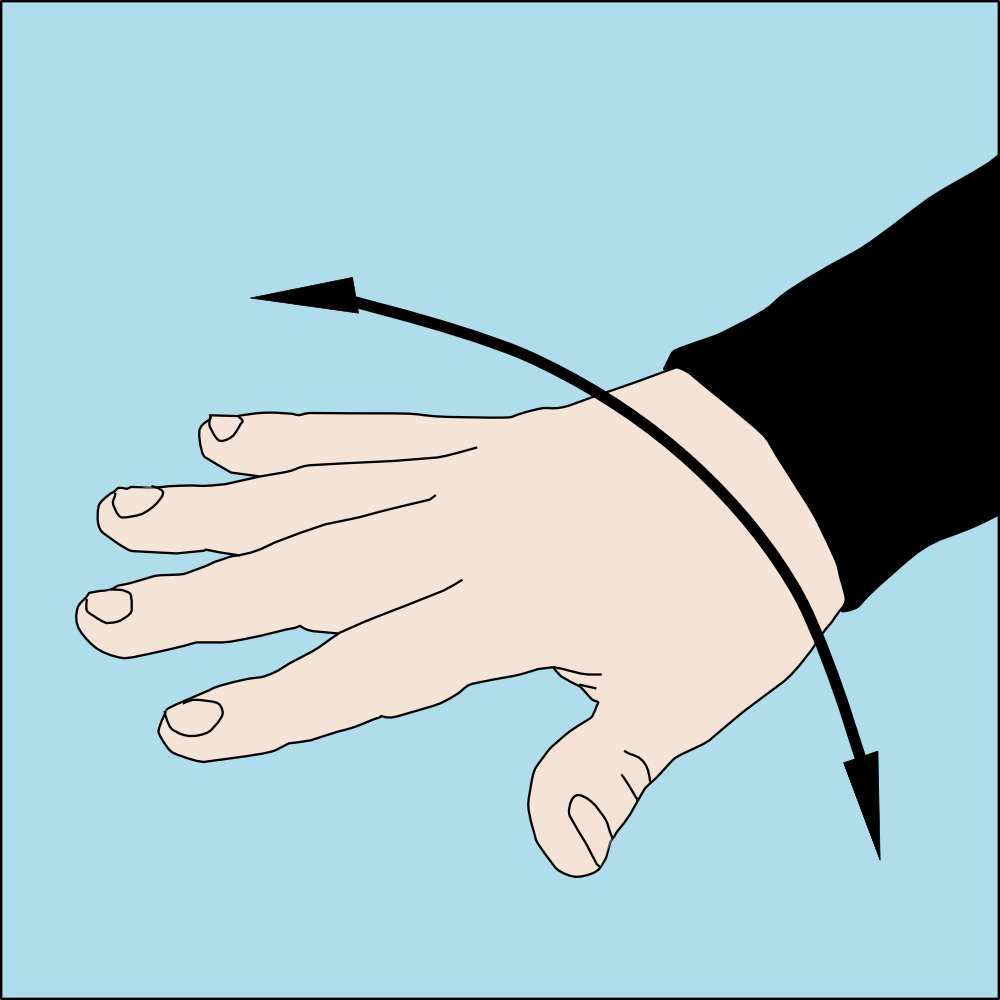
Something is wrong.

Divers need to communicate underwater to coordinate a dive, to warn of hazards, to indicate items of interest, and to signal distress. Most professional diving gear includes voice communication equipment, while recreational divers generally rely on hand signals and occasionally on light signals, touch signals, and text written on a slate. Through-water voice communication equipment is also available for recreational diving, but requires full-face masks.

Divers can use rope signals when connected to another diver, or tethered by either rope or umbilical. A few basic codes using "pulls" and "bells" (short tugs, grouped in pairs) are partly standardized. Professional divers mostly consider these backup signals if voice communications fail, but they can be helpful for recreational and particularly technical divers, who can use them on surface marker buoy lines to signal to the surface support crew.

Divers, including professionals, generally use hand signals when visibility allows. Recreational divers must be familiar with the hand signals their certification agency uses. These have to a large extent been standardized internationally and are taught in entry-level diving courses. Technical divers commonly add a few more.

A diver uses the dive light to make light signals in dark places with reasonable visibility, although few have been standardized. Lights can also be used to illuminate hand signals. Penetration divers also use a few touch signals in situations of extremely low visibility.

== Buddy diving ==
For recreational diving, buddy diving is the default mode, and the relevant skills of remaining close enough to be able to assist each other are considered entry level skills.

The primary competence expected of a buddy diver is to be close enough to their buddy at all times during a dive so that other buddy skills are possible when needed. When this function fails, the other skills cannot be applied. Buddy separation is usually a failure by both divers, but particularly the diver designated as the follower, as they should always be in a position to see the leader.

As it is quite common for buddy pairs to become separated during a dive, the skill of finding a lost buddy is central to the skill-set, and the most useful skill for this purpose is awareness of where the buddy was when last seen, and a knowledge of the dive plan sufficient to predict where they are most likely to have gone since last seen. This requires a high level of situational awareness in less than ideal conditions. It also requires a reasonably high level of cooperation between the divers, and an agreement of who is leading and who is following at any given time. A useful rule is that a diver towing a surface marker buoy is leading, as the surface team will know where they are with considerable accuracy and confidence compared to an unmarked diver, and therefore is not lost. The diver with the buoy is also encumbered by it and less able to move around quickly. This rule is commonly applied when divers dive in a larger group. A marker may be attached to the line or the diver to make them more visible and recognisable by the others.

The exact procedure to be followed in the event of buddy separation is variable, and depends on circumstances and the dive plan. The default taught by many instructors is to spend no more than a minute searching at depth, and then to surface, in the assumption that the other diver will do the same. In most dives this implies aborting the dive completely, as there is usually not enough gas to safely descend again after meeting up at the surface, so it is basically a procedure of last resort.

=== Pre-dive buddy checks ===
Before entering the water, buddy pairs conduct a pre-dive check on each other's equipment to confirm correct assembly, function, and readiness. The check covers, at minimum, the security of the cylinder and harness, the function of the regulator and air supply with the cylinder valve fully open, the function of the buoyancy compensator inflation and deflation, the location and quick-release of weights, the security of accessory equipment, and the activation of timing and depth instruments. Several diver certification agencies use mnemonics to assist recall of the check sequence, with the specific acronym varying between agencies.

The check serves a second purpose beyond verification: it familiarises each diver with the configuration of the buddy's equipment, including the location of the alternative gas supply and weight releases, so they can operate them in an emergency.

=== Maintaining contact during the dive ===
Buddy divers position themselves close enough to render assistance within a few seconds, but not so close that they impede each other's movement or interfere with finning. The appropriate spacing depends on visibility, current, and the dive environment; in low visibility, divers may need to swim side by side within touching distance, while in clear water a separation of a few metres is workable. Periodic visual contact is maintained by the follower, with both divers checking on each other at intervals through the dive.

In conditions of very low visibility or at night, buddy contact may be maintained by physical means, using a buddy line connecting the two divers, or by maintaining contact through hand or light signals at close range.

=== Monitoring and communication ===
Each diver is responsible for monitoring their own depth, time, decompression status, and gas supply, and for communicating relevant information to the buddy at appropriate intervals. Standard practice is to exchange gas pressure readings periodically, and to signal any change in physical condition, equalisation difficulty, or intent to alter depth or direction. Where one diver notices a problem with the other — uncontrolled buoyancy, equipment dragging, signs of stress, or unsafe positioning — they are expected to signal it without delay.

=== Gas sharing readiness ===
The most safety-critical buddy skill is the ability to share breathing gas in the event of a primary supply failure. The standard procedure used by most recreational training agencies has the donor present a secondary demand valve to the receiver, with both divers then ascending together at a controlled rate while remaining in physical contact. The skill is practised as both donor and receiver during entry-level training, and forms part of certification assessment.

Effective gas sharing depends on both divers knowing in advance the configuration of the donor's alternative air source, its routing, and the agreed method of donation, which is why familiarisation during the pre-dive check is important. Once gas sharing is established, the dive is terminated.

=== Buddy assistance with minor problems ===
A buddy is the first source of help for problems that do not require ending the dive: a flooded mask in difficult conditions, equipment that has come loose or shifted, difficulty equalising, or a minor cramp. Standard assistance includes stabilising the affected diver, signalling reassurance, helping to locate or secure displaced equipment, and supporting a controlled ascent if the problem cannot be resolved at depth.

== Solo diving ==
Solo diving requires an additional set of skills, but as compensation, the solo diver will not be separated from their buddy, as they do not have one. Consequently some divers follow solo diving protocols in the company of other divers, who they are not obliged to keep in contact with during the entire dive, nor search for if separated, nor abort the dive if they do not find them after being separated. As compensation for the lack of a buddy to help if they get into trouble, the solo diver is expected both to be sufficiently skilled not to get into trouble as easily, and to be equipped to get out of most forms of trouble by their own efforts, the most obvious being that the solo diver carries an independent emergency gas supply that is immediately available for use, and sufficient to get them to the surface safely from any point on the planned dive, after any reasonably foreseeable problem.

Besides competence in the standard set of scuba skills, there are a few more advanced self-reliance and self-rescue skills required for solo divers by some of the training agencies. The diver should be able to select and correctly use all equipment needed for the dive, including self-extrication gear for cutting loose from entanglement. A solo diver needs to be able to prepare, dress in and check all equipment used without buddy assistance.

The diver must have, and be competent to use, an acceptable alternative breathing gas configuration, redundant gauges and/or computers, DSMB and reel, compass, and depending on the certification agency and training centre, signalling device and line cutting device. During the course tests are conducted on swimming skills and swimming endurance, scuba skills associated with solo diving such as the use of redundant air and bailout to emergency gas supply, navigation skills and dive planning skills, and breathing gas management.

The CMAS Self-Rescue Diver training includes the deployment of colour-coded DSMBs – red for position indication, and yellow to indicate a problem, the use of a ratchet dive reel to control ascent rate in the event of unplanned positive buoyancy due to loss of weights – the end of the line is fastened to a heavy object on the bottom, and deployed under tension to control depth, and the use of a backup mask.

== Emergency procedures ==
Training includes procedures for managing reasonably foreseeable emergencies. These have been developed and standardized, and are included when the scope of diving may put divers at risk. Some of these are basic to entry-level training, and others are more advanced.

=== Managing loss of breathing gas ===
Any interruption of air supply for more than a few seconds constitutes a life-threatening emergency. Divers address temporary interruptions due to flooding or dislodging the demand valve by recovering and clearing it. Even ending the dive with an emergency ascent is an appropriate procedure in some circumstances. Other solutions involve switching to an alternative gas supply, either from the diver's emergency supply, or from another diver.

=== Managing regulator malfunctions ===
Divers can manage malfunctions to a greater or lesser extent, but some, such as a burst hose, are generally not recoverable. Sometimes it is possible to save gas on a manifolded twin or a single cylinder with dual regulators, if the cylinder valve is closed in time.

==== Feather breathing ====
Free-flow can sometimes be managed by feather breathing, which involves manual cylinder valve operation to control gas flow, a procedure also known as feathering the gas or feathering the valve. This only works if the cylinder valve is easily reachable, by the diver, so this procedure is usually limited to side- or sling-mounted cylinders. The diver may resort to feather breathing when the ability to use the gas in the cylinder with the malfunctioning regulator is necessary to ensure sufficient gas to safely terminate the dive. The alternatives of bailing out to another cylinder, switching to an alternative regulator or sharing gas with another diver are usually safer and more convenient, but a long decompression stop may be shortened by feather breathing the decompression gas when its regulator is the one to malfunction. The cylinder valve is kept closed to stop gas flow between breaths, and manually opened sufficiently to inhale a breath when needed. The procedure is labor intensive and requires constant attention, but is not difficult after some practice.

Regulator icing is a problem in cold water, particularly with equipment not rated for cold water operation. Freezing of water in contact with the first stage can lock it open, initiating a free-flow which will further cool the regulator. The only way this can be stopped is to close the supply valve from the cylinder. Then the diver must switch to an alternate regulator that receives its gas supply from a different cylinder valve. A similar problem can occur with the second stage, and a heavy free flow will commonly cause icing of both stages, even in water that is not particularly cold. Where there is only one regulator on the cylinder, feather breathing may cut the flow down sufficiently for the problem to resolve by the ice melting, after which normal function my resume.

==== Wet regulator ====
Water leaks and wet breathing are usually caused by damage to the second-stage regulator exhaust valve, diaphragm, or mouthpiece. The diver should switch to an alternative second stage if available, though careful breathing and placement of the tongue in the air path can minimize salt spray aspiration.

==== Gas leaks ====
Most gas leaks cannot be corrected underwater. The diver should consider the risk of the leak getting worse when deciding whether to terminate a dive.

==== Excessive work of breathing ====
Some second stages can be adjusted to reduce breathing effort at depth, others cannot. The diver may have the option to switch to an alternate gas supply or regulator, but should consider the consequences of the problem deteriorating further when deciding whether to terminate a dive. Manually assisting the opening of the second stage by controlled operation of the purge button during inhalation may help. The effect is similar to feather breathing.

==== Juddering, moaning, and popping ====
These are signs of mechanical problems, some of which may get worse during the dive, but do not in themselves constitute an emergency. Popping is usually a sign of a slow first-stage leak.

=== Emergency air sharing ===
Emergency breathing gas sharing is a critical safety skill when buddy diving or standby diving in any situation where a scuba diver cannot safely make an emergency ascent to the surface to access atmospheric air at any time. This may involve sharing a single demand valve, or one diver providing an alternative gas supply to another. The gas may be from the same scuba set that the donor is using, or from a separate cylinder. The preferred technique of air sharing is donation of a demand valve from a buddy diver who does not need to breathe from it while sharing gas. The standard approach is "octopus donation," in which the buddy offers a secondary demand valve, although this approach is not universal. A variation is for the buddy to offer a primary demand valve, while switching to the secondary. This is often more likely to calm a diver in trouble, because they will know that the gas will be appropriate for the depth.

Alternatively, two divers can share a single demand valve. This is known as buddy breathing. Divers alternately breathe from one demand valve, each taking two breaths at a time. Because the receiver is likely to initially be out of breath, they may need a few more breaths at first to stabilize. The technique has high task loading and relatively high risk, and is no longer taught widely, although some groups still use it.

Once gas sharing has been established, the dive terminates, unless the underlying problem can be resolved. Assisted ascents using a secondary demand valve are simpler than buddy breathing ascents, the risk to both divers is lower, task loading is less, gas consumption may be less, and the skill is quicker to learn.

Where a confined environment may make it necessary for the divers to swim in single file, use of a long hose for the donated regulator is necessary unless the gas is supplied from a cylinder which can be handed off to the recipient.

=== Emergency ascents ===
An emergency ascent is made when no available procedure will allow a dive to continue safely. It is usually the direct response to an ongoing emergency which cannot be managed at depth. A controlled ascent which is made to terminate a dive after an emergency has been brought under control, and which follows recommended safe procedures, is not generally considered an emergency ascent. These are independent ascents, where a single diver either manages the ascent alone, or is helped by another diver who provides gas, propulsion, buoyancy, or other assistance. In an emergency ascent the diver initiates the action intentionally, and chooses the procedure. Ascents that are involuntary or unintentionally uncontrolled are considered accidents.

- In a buoyant ascent the diver is propelled by positive buoyancy. The level of control may vary considerably.
- In a controlled emergency swimming ascent (CESA), the ascent remains under control and is performed at a safe rate.
- In an emergency swimming ascent (ESA), the diver swims to the surface at either negative or approximately neutral buoyancy.

Other forms of ascent which may be considered emergency ascents are:

- Tethered ascent, where a diver controls the ascent rate by using a ratchet reel with the line secured to the bottom. This can be used if weights have been lost at depth and it will not be possible to maintain neutral buoyancy throughout the ascent, and if the diver must decompress. The line must be long enough to reach the surface, and may have to be abandoned after surfacing. A variant of this ascent is if the diver is assisted by another diver who has adequate weighting and holds onto the buoyant diver to keep them under control. If the diver manages to find suitable additional weight in the form of rocks or wreckage, and uses it to compensate for a recognised weight deficit, it is debatable whether this would be considered an emergency situation or a well managed contingency.
- Lost-mask ascent, where a diver surfaces without the capacity for reading their instruments. It may not be possible to accurately monitor depth, rate of ascent, or decompression stops. Instead, another diver can monitor the ascent, or the diver can use the dive computer's audible alarms to know when to slow down. Alternatively, the diver can use a tangible indicator to regulate ascent such as a DSMB line, shotline, or anchor line. As a last resort, rising more slowly than the smallest exhaled bubbles is generally safe when decompression stops are not required. The technique of trapping an air bubble at an eye may be used to make occasional instrument checks.
- Lost-buoyancy ascent, where a diver cannot establish neutral or positive buoyancy without dropping weights. Either buoyancy compensator failure or dry suit flooding can cause this. Use of a DSMB or lift bag on a reel, or ascent using a shotline or anchor line to control depth and ascent rate can compensate, or the diver can rely on a buddy for additional buoyancy. Dropping weights can have an effect difficult to predict with accuracy, and dropping the minimum amount which allows the diver to ascend under control is desirable, as buoyancy may increase during the ascent, and an ascent with insufficient buoyancy can become an excessively buoyant ascent part way up, with a decompression obligation as a possible complication. Using a weight belt as a bottom weight for a tethered ascent may provide sufficient control, and has the added advantage of the possibility of recovering the weights once on the boat, using the reel line.

Emergency ascent training policy differs considerably among the certification agencies, and has generated controversy regarding risk-benefit. Some agencies consider it irresponsible to fail to teach skills which could allow divers to safely manage foreseeable emergencies. Others claim that one is more likely to injure divers while training these skills than they are ever likely to actually need them. Accident statistics remain inconclusive.

=== Ditching weights ===
The dropping of ballast weights to gain buoyancy is a skill which can save the diver's life in an emergency, but must be used with due care, as it can also put the diver at severe risk if they have a serious decompression obligation. Removal and dropping of weights is one of the earliest skills taught in entry level scuba diving and freediving, as it can be a life-saving event when a diver cannot get to the surface or stay there because of excess weight. Divers who do not expect to incur obligatory decompression stops are usually taught to carry some or all of there ballast weigh in a manner that allows themselves or a rescuer to rapidly and easily discard enough weight to establish positive buoyancy. The most common methods are by using a weight belt with a quick-release buckle, worn over the scuba harness, so that when the buckle is released, the weight belt will fall free, and by using quick release weight pouches in dedicated pockets on the BCD. Although this is an obligatory skill for almost all scuba divers, it is common to find dead divers still wearing their full set of weights, particularly when the diver was overweighted.

=== Buoyancy compensator failure ===
It may be necessary for the diver to establish positive buoyancy if the buoyancy compensator fails. The following methods are available:

- A dry suit may be inflated. This increases the risk of inversion and an uncontrolled inverted ascent, so is less risky when done trimmed feet down. The automatic dump valve must be adjusted to retain more gas. This is a preferred method when available, as no equipment is abandoned, and full control of buoyancy is retained throughout the ascent.
- Weights may be dropped. Ideally one drops only enough weight to establish neutral buoyancy, but this is not always possible. At the surface, more weight may be dropped at only the cost of the weights. If no weights can be dropped, it may become necessary to abandon the scuba set. This method is not reversible if too much weight is dropped.
- Some buoyancy compensators have a backup bladder, which may be inflated if the primary fails. However, divers should take care not to unintentionally inflate the backup bladder, as this may lead to a runaway buoyant ascent.
- Divers can deploy a decompression buoy or lifting bag on a reel, using the line to control depth. There are hazards in deployment, but it is a standard procedure. Once the buoy is at the surface, this allows excellent depth control if the buoy is big enough. The diver can ascend safely by controlling the rate at which the line is wound back on the reel. A ratchet reel is preferable for this procedure, as it will not unwind under load unless the ratchet is released. It is necessary to keep the buoy inflated once the diver has surfaced unless another method for providing positive buoyancy is used.
- Weights can be removed from the diver and fastened to the end of a reel line clipped to the diver. The diver then lets out line to control the ascent. This is the same procedure used to control surfacing when weights are lost. The reel line is tied off to the bottom in the CMAS self-sufficient diver qualification, but using the weights, which may be recovered later by using the reel.

=== Buoyancy compensator blowup ===
If there is a continuous gas leak into the buoyancy compensator, the diver can continuously dump excess gas while disconnecting the low-pressure supply hose. If the diver is upright or trimmed even slightly heads-up, this usually allows gas to exit faster than it enters. This ability to disconnect the inflation hose under pressure is an important safety skill, as an uncontrolled buoyant ascent puts the diver at risk of lung overpressure injury, and depending on decompression obligation, at severe risk of decompression sickness. Once disconnected, the diver can neutralize buoyancy by oral inflation or further deflation. If using a full-face mask, the hose can be temporarily reconnected to add gas when needed.

=== Dry suit flooding ===
A dry suit leak can range from a trickle to a flood. Two aspects of a catastrophic flood put the diver at risk.

- Damage to the lower part of the suit can admit cold water for winter divers, or contaminated water or chemicals for hazmat divers. This may not materially affect buoyancy, and the risk is mainly heat loss or contamination. A normal ascent is typically feasible, but exiting the water may be difficult due to the weight of trapped water.
- Damage to the upper part of the suit can cause a sudden gas venting, significantly or catastrophically reducing buoyancy and triggering uncontrolled descent and flooding. The buoyancy loss may exceed the buoyancy compensator's capacity. The simplest remedy is to drop sufficient weight to allow the buoyancy compensator to function effectively. This requires sufficient detachable weight. Some divers do not prepare for this contingency in their weight distribution, and such planning is not covered by all training standards.
- A flooded suit may hold so much water that the diver cannot exit the water because of the weight and inertia. It may be necessary to cut a small slit in the lower part of each flooded leg to drain the water.

=== Dry suit blowup ===
These possible consequences are similar to those of a BCD blowup, and are managed in similar ways. The instinctive reaction of trying to swim downward is usually counterproductive, as it will prevent the automatic dump valve from releasing excess gas, while at the same time inflating the suit legs, making it difficult to fin. If the boots slip off it will be impossible to fin. The diver must ensure that the dump valve is fully open and at the high point of the suit. Then the diver should urgently disconnect the inflation hose. Many suits will release air at the neck or cuff seal if those are the highest points of the suit. It may be necessary to descend after this to compensate for rapid ascent, dumping gas from the BCD. After achieving neutral buoyancy, a normal ascent is usually possible, as it is seldom necessary to add air to the suit during ascent. The type of inflation hose connection can make a large difference to the urgency of the situation. The CEJN connector allows a much faster gas flow than the Seatec quick-disconnect fitting, and for this reason the DIR community considers it safer.

=== Manifolded twins ===
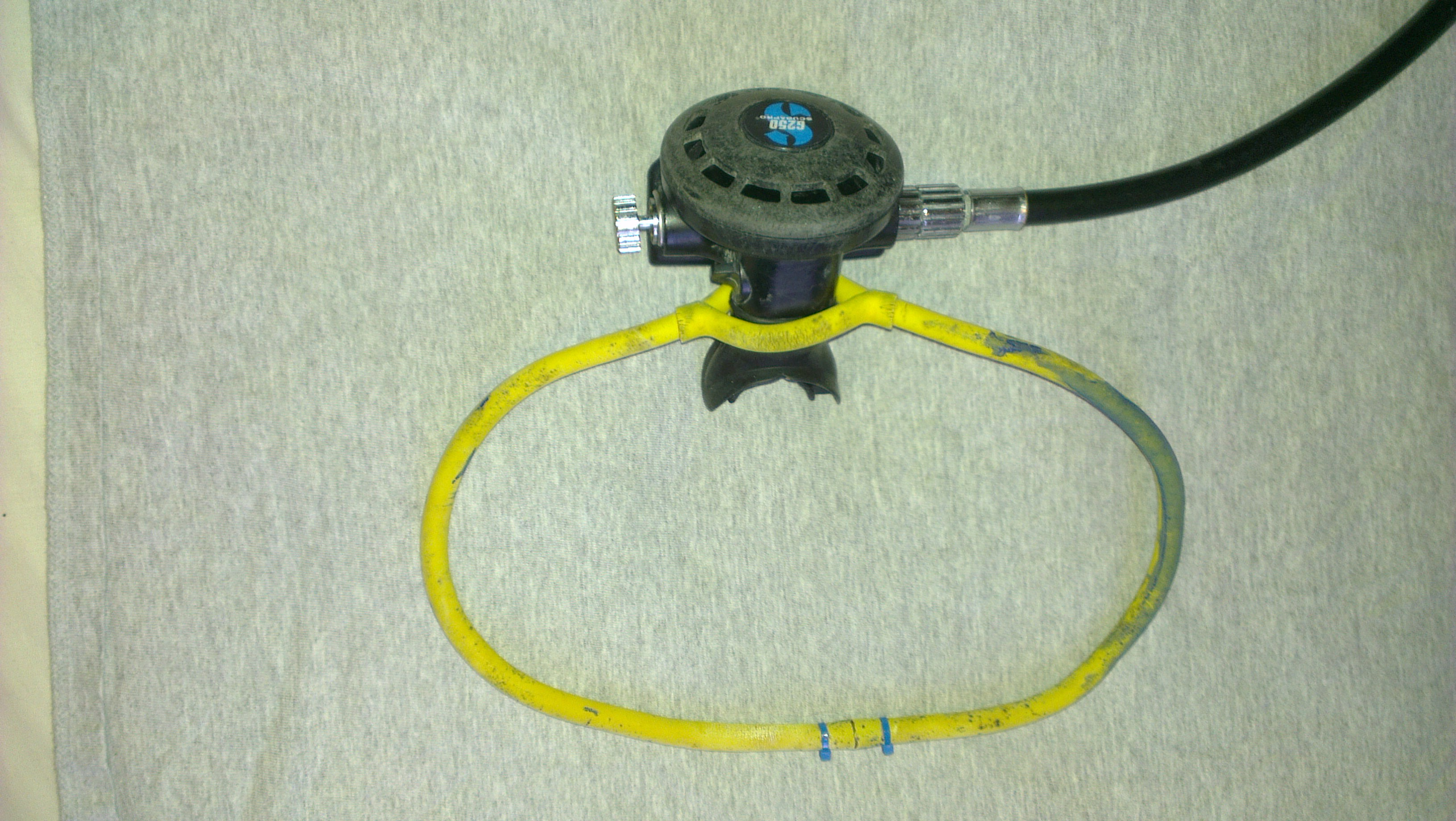
The secondary second-stage demand valve can be kept in place just under the diver's chin by an elastic loop which goes around the neck.

The Doing It Right movement developed one of the standardized configurations with manifolded twins, specifically for cave exploration. Many technical divers use these procedures. The diver breathes normally from a right-side primary second-stage regulator, mounted on a long hose tucked under at the waist and looped behind the head for quick deployment. A secondary second-stage regulator is carried just beneath the chin, suspended by a breakaway elastic loop around the neck, and supplied from the left-side cylinder first-stage by a shorter hose. The cylinder valves and manifold isolation valve are normally open:

- Should another diver experience an out-of-air emergency, the donor diver offers the primary regulator, because it is known to be working correctly. The donor then switches to the secondary regulator. The entire gas supply is available to both divers. The primary hoses are long enough that they are able to separate by a sufficient distance to pass through tight restrictions with the donor ahead of the recipient.
- If the primary regulator malfunctions, the diver closes the right-shoulder cylinder valve and switches to the secondary regulator. The entire gas supply remains available.
- If the secondary regulator malfunctions, the diver closes the left-shoulder cylinder valve, continuing to breathe through the primary regulator. The entire gas supply remains available.
- Cylinder to manifold connection malfunction can result in violent gas loss. Should the right side manifold connection leak, the diver closes the isolating valve to secure the gas in the left cylinder, and continues to use the gas from the right cylinder, switching to the secondary regulator if needed. At least half of the remaining gas volume is available once the isolation valve has been closed.
- Should the left-side manifold connection leak, the diver closes the isolating valve and switches to the secondary regulator to use the gas in the left cylinder while possible, switching back to the primary regulator after the secondary is exhausted. At least half of the remaining gas is available once the isolation valve has been closed.

=== Lost or broken guide line ===
Losing the guide line in a cave or wreck, or finding that it is broken during exit, is a potentially life-threatening emergency. While following recommended best practice makes it highly unlikely that a diver will lose the line, it can and does happen, and there are procedures which will usually work to find it again. In all situations, the diver will attempt to stabilise the situation and avoid getting further lost, and make a thorough visual check in all directions from where they are at the time, taking into account the possibility of the line being in a line trap. If the diver has not also separated from their buddy, the buddy may know where the line is, and can be asked, and if the diver is separated from their buddy, the buddy may be at the line, and the buddy's light may be visible.

== Dive management skills ==
These are the skills of following the dive plan to avoid undesirable events. They include planning and monitoring the dive profile, gas usage and decompression, navigation, communication, and modifying any plan to suit actual circumstances.

=== Monitoring depth and time, and decompression status ===
Whenever a dive may require decompression stops, it is necessary to monitor dive depth and duration to ensure that appropriate decompression procedures are followed if necessary. This process may be automated via a dive computer, in which case the diver must understand how to read the output and respond correctly to the information displayed, and for more complex dive plans, to input the appropriate settings. The display and operation of dive computers is not standardized, so the diver must learn to operate the specific model of computer. Accurate monitoring of depth and time is particularly important when diving using a schedule requiring decompression according to decompression tables, when a diving watch and depth gauge are used.

Undertaking dives with obligatory decompression stops requires the diver to follow the appropriate decompression profile. This includes maintaining depth for necessary intervals, and ascending at the correct rate. Ideally the diver should be able to do this without a static reference, referring only to instrument displays, but a decompression buoy or shotline may be used to indicate appropriate stopping points, thereby reducing any associated risk. Decompression stops are considered an advanced skill for recreational divers, but may be considered a basic skill for professional divers. Recreational divers are required to be able to avoid incurring a staged decompression obligation as a basic skill.

=== Breathing gas management ===
For the basic case of no-decompression open-water diving, which allows a free emergency ascent, breathing gas management requires ensuring sufficient air remains for a safe ascent (plus a contingency reserve). It also considers the possibility of an assisted ascent, where the diver shares air with another diver. Gas management becomes more complex when solo diving, decompression diving, penetration diving, or diving with more than one gas mixture.

A submersible pressure gauge indicates the remaining gas pressure in each diving cylinder. The amount of available gas remaining can be calculated from the pressure, the cylinder internal volume, and the planned reserve allowance. The time that the diver can dive on the available gas depends on the depth, gas mixture, work load, and diver fitness. Breathing rates can vary considerably, and estimates are largely derived from experience. Conservative estimates are generally used for planning purposes. The diver must know when to turn the dive and start the exit and ascent while there is enough gas to surface safely.

=== Navigation ===
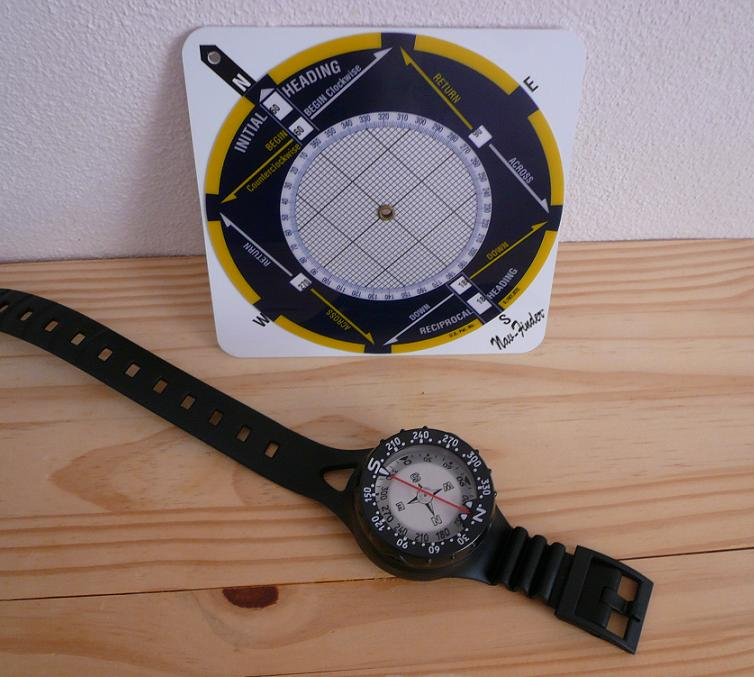
Nav finder and underwater compass – basic underwater navigation tools

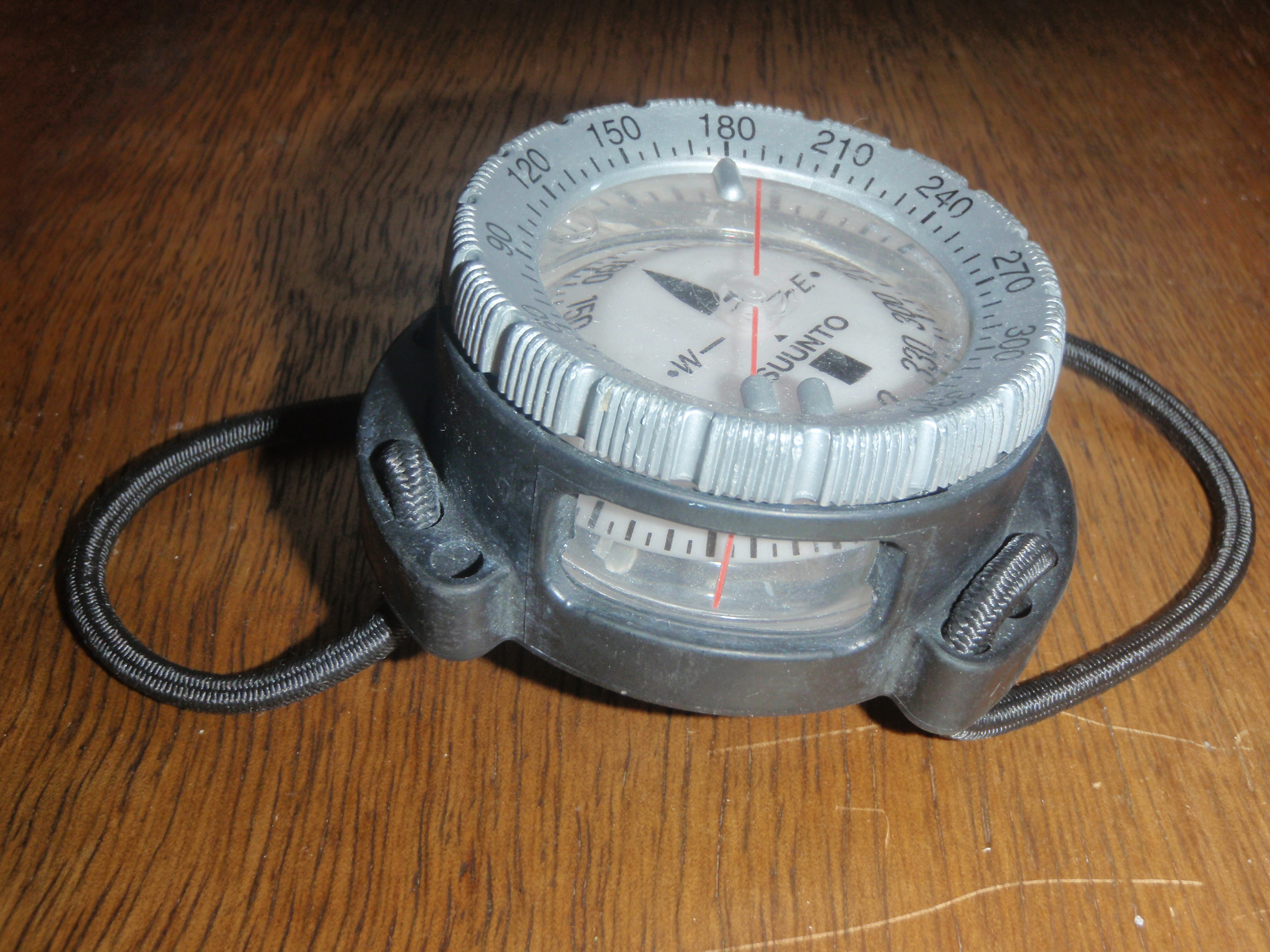
Suunto SK-7 diving compass in aftermarket wrist mount with bungee straps

The two basic aspects of scuba navigation are surface navigation to find the dive site, and underwater navigation, to find specific places and to reach the ascent point.

Underwater navigation includes observing natural features, operating a compass, estimating distance travelled, and setting distance lines used to navigate underwater. Basic navigation is normally taught as part of entry level certification. Advanced underwater navigation is usually part of advanced recreational diver training including rescue training.

=== Use of auxiliary equipment ===
These are generally considered advanced techniques for recreational divers, but basic skills for professional divers.

- Bailout to a redundant gas supply: switching to a bailout cylinder in case of main gas supply failure. Techniques depend on how the cylinder is carried and mask type.
- Surface marker buoys: a buoy indicates the position of the diver(s) to people on the surface. Control of line tension is important to prevent entanglement and snags.
- Decompression buoys: inflatable buoys allow the diver to signal that the ascent has begun, and indicate the position of the diver to people on the surface, often the boat crew who recover the divers. Deployment skills include controlled inflation, paying out line while avoiding snags and jams, maintaining appropriate depth control during deployment, and control of line tension during ascent.
- Distance lines: line carried on a reel or spool and laid out as a guide for the return.
- Shot lines: these allow divers to follow the line, reach the bottom at the right place, and ascend to the surface where the crew expects them. The choice, rigging, and deployment of shotlines to suit the dive profile and environmental conditions is another skill.
- Nitrox diving: the safe use of nitrox mixtures depends on remaining at depths where the partial pressure of oxygen is within acceptable limits. This requires knowledge of the oxygen fraction, which is necessary to calculate the maximum operating depth.
- Switching gases for accelerated decompression: this requires positive identification of the appropriate breathing gas in use at any time, as decompression mixtures are typically dangerous to breathe at the dive's maximum depth.
- Helium-based breathing gases (trimix and heliox): these gases are used to reduce nitrogen narcosis at greater depths, and advanced skills of dive planning, gas switching, dive monitoring and decompression are needed. These are considered advanced skills for both professional and recreational diving.
- Lifelines and buddy lines: the use of a lifeline is a team skill. The diver's line tender controls the deployment and recovery of the line, and ensures that slack is kept to a minimum. The diver informs the tender by line signals when to let out more and when to pull in. The diver must avoid getting the line snagged on underwater obstacles, or inadvertently passing under things which may prevent a direct ascent to the surface. Buddy lines may be used to prevent buddy separation in darkness or low visibility. The divers must be able to release the lines on their own end in an emergency, and must avoid snagging lines on underwater obstacles.

=== Logging the dive ===
The diver's log is a record of the diving experience, and professional divers are required to keep theirs up to date and correctly filled in. The diving supervisor is usually required to countersign each page of a professional diver's logbook to maintain it for legal use. Recreational logbooks are generally not required outside of training, but are recommended. They may be inspected by service providers as evidence of experience when applying for further training or applying to participate in dives requiring specific experience. Electronic logs are becoming more popular, and newer dive computers will download the dive data they collect automatically in a reasonably user-friendly format. The user must still input some information, such as the venue, dive buddy, and what was seen and done on the dive.

== Diver rescue ==
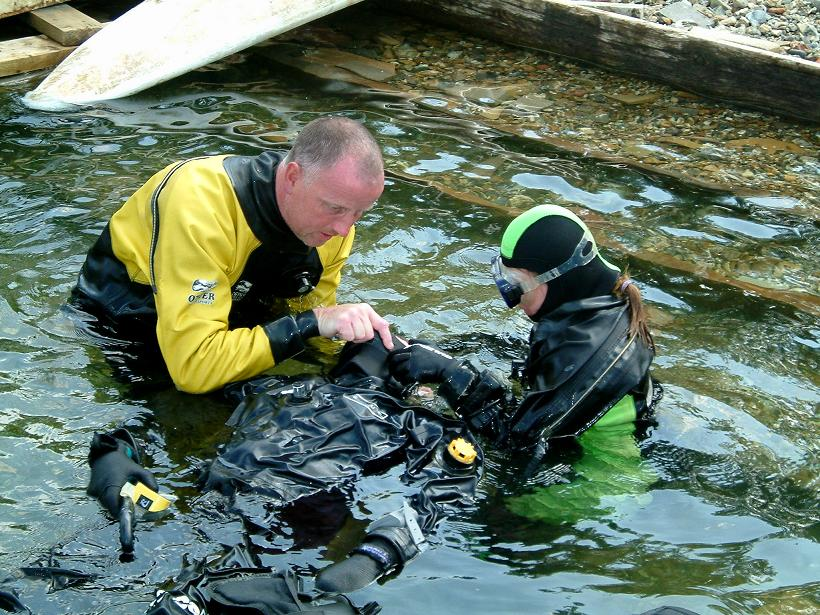
Rescue training exercise

Diver rescue is the process of avoiding or reducing further exposure to diving hazards and bringing a compromised diver to safety, such as a boat or shore, where first aid can be administered and additional medical treatment is available. Rescue skills are considered by some agencies to be beyond the scope of entry-level divers, while others consider them entry-level diving skills required as part of the professional skill set for a stand-by diver.

Diver rescue skills include:

- Controlled buoyant lift – a technique used to safely raise an incapacitated diver to the surface.
- Making the diver buoyant on the surface.
- Attracting help.
- Towing a diver on the surface.
- Landing the diver.
- In-water artificial respiration.
- CPR.
- Oxygen first aid.
- General first aid.

More than one technique may be taught for some of these skills.

== Dry suits ==
Skills necessary for the safe use of dry suits include:

- Choosing a suit of appropriate size and fit. The suit should allow freedom of movement to work and reach all necessary accessories, valves etc. when worn over suitable undergarments. The seals should be tight enough to be reliable without restricting blood flow, particularly at the neck.
- Selecting appropriate undergarments for the water temperature. Undergarments should provide appropriate insulation, fit without constraining movement, tuck under the suit comfortably, and provide sufficient insulation in case of a leak to allow the diver to safely ascend and exit the water.
- Inspection of the suit for damage and defects before the dive, zip lubrication, and a check of seal condition.
- Putting the suit on without damaging the wrist and neck seals, using a suitable lubricant if applicable, and adjusting the seals to lie smoothly on the neck and wrists, without folds or leak paths caused by hair or clothing.
- Closing the zip correctly to avoid damage or leaks. A smooth pull while supporting the zip, and ensuring that the zip does not snag on the fold of the suit, undergarments, or hair. Sealing surfaces must be free of any contamination which could cause the zip to jam, dislocate, or leak.
- Removing excess gas after putting on the suit. Usually done by opening the dump valve and squatting down, while hugging the knees to compress the suit as much as possible.
- Choosing and distributing ballast weight to provide correct trim and buoyancy at the start and end of the dive.
- Maintaining an appropriate gas volume in the suit during the dive to avoid suit squeeze or large bubbles of excess air.
  - Buoyancy control during descent, at constant depth, and during ascent, by adding gas when needed via the inflator valve. Dumping excess, usually by keeping the dump valve high and adjusted correctly.
  - Inflation and dumping excess gas - setting the auto-dump valve. A correctly set auto-dump valve will seldom require adjustment during ascent.
  - Maintaining appropriate trim and attitude underwater and at the surface. To a large extent this depends on correct weighting and weight distribution.
- Undressing from the suit without damaging the zip or seals. Withdrawing hands through the wrist seals can take some practice, as seals are easily damaged. A lubricant that does not harm the seal can help.
- Post-dive cleaning and maintenance.
- Managing contingencies:
  - Connecting and disconnecting a pressurized inflator hose: It is possible, with a little effort, to connect an inflator hose under pressure, as long as the locking balls are free to retract and the locking ring slides back to release the balls. It just requires being pushed on far enough that the locking system engages. However, in rare cases the hose end is not entirely compatible with the nipple on the valve, and these incompatible combinations will not connect regardless of whether they are pressurized, so it is important to check compatibility on rented or new equipment. If the dry-suit and buoyancy compensator use the same connector, they can be swapped out if one malfunctions. Buoyancy compensators have an oral inflation option, so if the dry-suit inflator hose does not supply air for any reason during a dive, the BC hose can be used. The inflator will normally be swapped out under pressure, so the cylinder valves do not have to be closed and regulators purged for the swap, which is likely to leave the diver without breathing gas while making the swap. When a hose is connected underwater, a small amount of water will be trapped in the connector and blown into the suit when the valve is operated. This is minor issue.
  - Managing a stuck inflation valve: Inflation valves are quite simple, but can jam open or closed. If the valve jams open and a few pushes don't loosen it up, it will be necessary to disconnect the inflator hose or constantly dump gas from the suit. Depending on the leak flow rate either of these options may work, though a disconnection will usually be safer, and it should not be necessary to add gas to the suit during ascent.
  - Recovery from inversion.
  - Recovery from uncontrolled buoyant ascent/blowup.
  - Managing a leak or flood.

== Rebreather ==
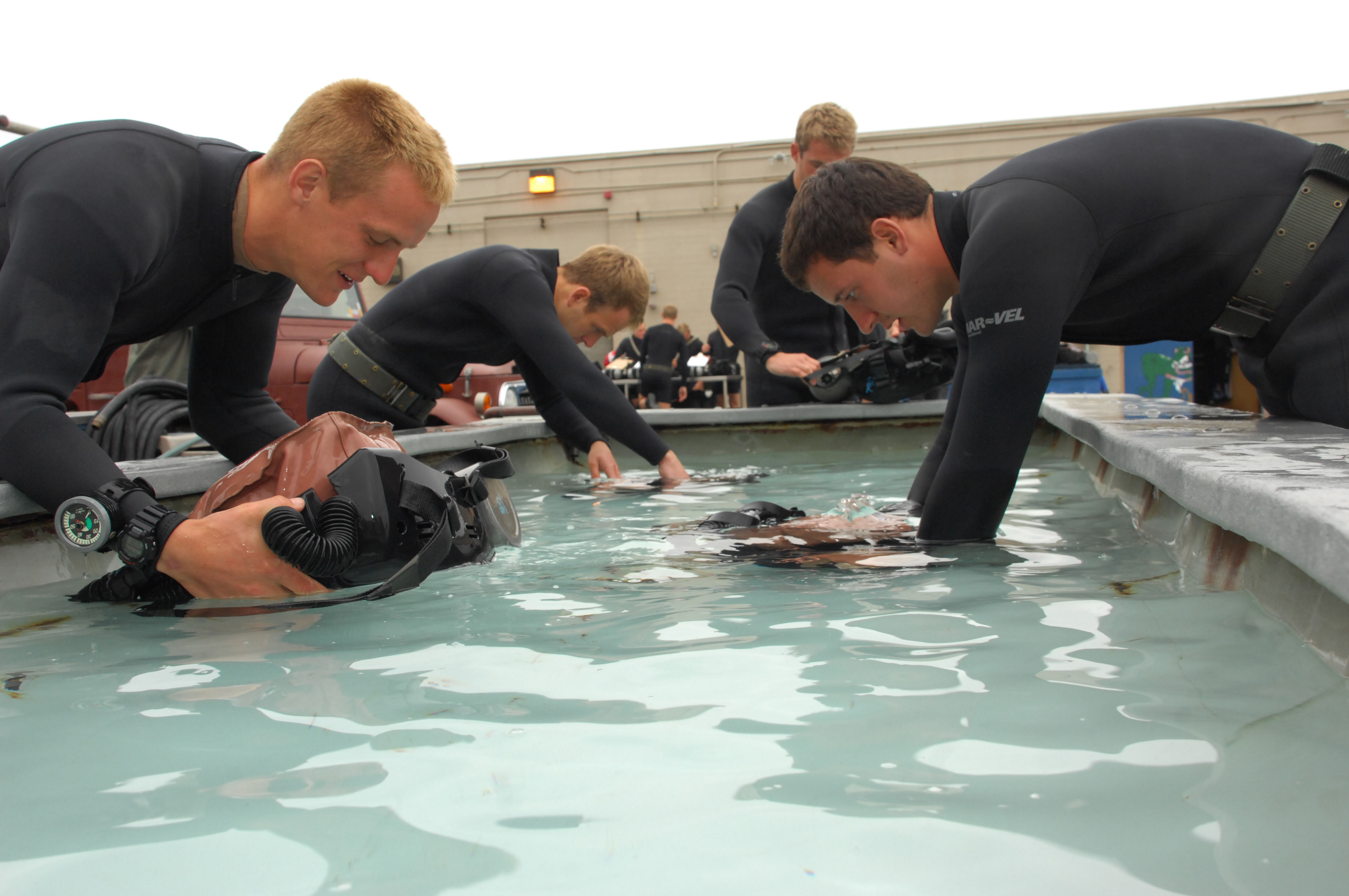
Pre-dive leak checks on rebreathers

Rebreather skills are necessary when using a rebreather for recreational or technical diving. Due to the technical complexity of mixed gas rebreather design and construction, and the significantly larger number of possible failure modes compared with open circuit diving, the skill set is more complex and generally requires more training and practice to master. As with most diving equipment, skills are needed for preparation, in-water standard operation, emergencies, and after-use maintenance, all of which may involve details specific to the model of rebreather in use, though there are common principles involved.

- Preparing the rebreather: parts of the rebreather may require assembly before use, after which it must be tested. The scrubber canister must be filled with the correct amount of absorbent material. Positive and negative pressure tests are typically conducted. The positive pressure test ensures that the unit does not lose gas while in use, and the negative pressure test ensures that water does not leak into the breathing loop where it can degrade the scrubber medium or the oxygen sensors.
- Pre-breathing the unit (usually for about 3 minutes) shortly before entering the water ensures that the scrubber material warms to operating temperature, and in closed circuit rebreathers, that the partial pressure of oxygen is controlled correctly.
- Correct weighting, trim and buoyancy control (different from open circuit).
- Ascents and descents.
- Monitoring oxygen partial pressure: partial pressure is of critical importance on CCRs and is monitored at frequent intervals, particularly during descent, where oxygen toxicity is possible, and ascent, where the risk of hypoxia is highest.
- Monitoring carbon dioxide level: carbon dioxide buildup is a hazard, and most rebreathers do not provide CO_{2} monitoring. The diver must watch for indications.
- Mask clearing and dive/surface valve draining.
- Switching to alternative gas supply: bailout to open circuit is generally considered a good option given any uncertainty about the problem or whether it can be solved. The bailout procedure depends on rebreather details and the bailout equipment. Methods include:
  - Switch the mouthpiece bailout valve to open circuit.
  - Open a bailout demand valve already connected to the full face mask, or by nose-breathing, where applicable.
  - Close and exchange the rebreather mouthpiece for a separate demand valve.
  - Close the mouthpiece and switch to the mouthpiece of another rebreather.
- Bailout ascent: unless the problem can be corrected quickly and reliably, bailout requires aborting the dive.
- Diluent flush: many diver training organizations teach the "diluent flush" technique as a safe way to restore the mix to an appropriate level of oxygen. It works only when partial pressure of oxygen in the diluent would not cause hypoxia or hyperoxia, such as when using a normoxic diluent and observing the diluent's maximum operating depth. The technique involves simultaneously venting the loop and injecting diluent. This flushes out the old mix and replaces it with a known proportion of oxygen.
- Drain the loop: regardless of whether the particular rebreather has the facility to trap water, it may be necessary to remove excess water from the loop.
- After-dive maintenance. Stripping, cleaning and preparation for storage.

== Special applications ==
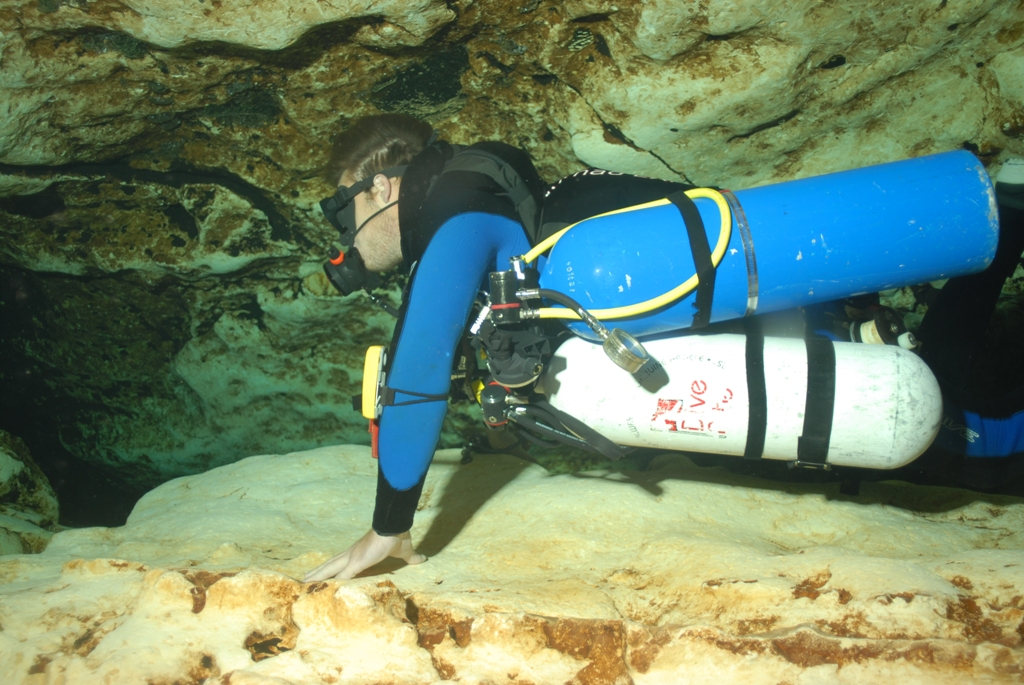
Sidemount diving is particularly appropriate for tight cave restrictions

Special applications require additional skills. In many cases such skills can be shared across applications, with only a few specific to that application. Many underwater work and activity skills are not directly related to the use of scuba equipment.

Example applications:

- Decompression diving – Diving where the diver incurs a decompression obligation. The skills of monitoring gas use, and monitoring and control of ascent rate, are critical for decompression safety. In open water the use of a decompression buoy to control depth during ascent can significantly reduce the risk of accidentally violating decompression obligations.
  - Gas switching – Changing the breathing gas mixture during a dive. It is often critical to diver safety to use the correct gas mixture for the current dive depth when several are carried, and the mixture used can make a large difference in the decompression obligation.
  - Management of multiple cylinders – Techniques for carrying and using multiple scuba sets. Multiple cylinders may be used to carry a larger supply of gas to extend possible dive duration, or to provide breathing gas appropriate to the depth and for accelerated decompression. The diver must be aware of which mixture is appropriate and which is in use, and be able to make the correct adjustments to suit the gases.
- Penetration diving – Diving under a physical barrier to a direct vertical ascent to the surface. In penetration diving, the most important specialist skill is the use of guide lines for navigation, to ensure that divers can find their way out from under the overhead and surface without running out of breathing gas.
  - Cave diving – Diving in water-filled caves.
  - Ice diving – Underwater diving under ice.
  - Wreck diving – Recreational diving on wrecks.
- Sidemount diving – Diving using equipment configuration where scuba sets are clipped to the diver's sides.
- Solo diving – Recreational diving without a dive buddy.
- Underwater searches – Techniques for finding underwater targets.
- Underwater search and recovery – Locating and recovering underwater objects.
- Underwater survey – Inspection or measurement in or of an underwater environment.
- Hand-off a cylinder – Transfer a sidemount or sling cylinder from one diver to another in the water, usually at depth or at a decompression stop, to provide contingency gas, or as a planned part of the dive. Both divers will have to compensate for the buoyancy change due to weight transfer. This procedure is most likely to be used in a situation where the donor cannot conveniently stay close alongside the receiver while negotiating a restriction, or when the receiver is doing a long decompression stop and the donor needs to surface.

== Training, assessment and certification ==
Scuba skills training is primarily directed by a registered or certified diving instructor. Additional practice and skills maintenance are the diver's responsibility. Recreational divers may attend refresher courses, which may involve revisions to earlier practices. Service providers such as dive shops and charter boats may require a checkout dive for divers unfamiliar with the region, or who haven't dived for some time.

It is the individual diver's responsibility to maintain sufficient skill and fitness to dive safely and not endanger themselves or others, and to judge whether they are ready to handle the anticipated conditions.

=== Recreational diver training ===
Many recreational diver training organizations offer diver training. Successful completion is shown by the issuance of a "diving certification," also known as a "C-card," or qualification card.

Recreational diver training courses range from minor specialties which require one classroom session and an open water dive, and which may be completed in a day, to complex specialties which may take days to weeks, and require classroom sessions, confined water skills training and practice such as in a swimming pool, and open-water dives, followed by assessment of knowledge and skills.

The initial open-water training for a person who is medically fit to dive and a reasonably competent swimmer is relatively short. Many dive shops in popular holiday locations offer courses intended to teach a novice to dive in a few days. Other instructors and dive schools provide longer and more thorough training.

Diving instructors affiliated to a diving certification agency may work independently, or through a university, a dive club, a dive school or a dive shop. They offer courses that satisfy the standards of a certification organization.

=== Professional and technical diver training ===
Professional diver training is typically provided by schools affiliated to or approved by one or more commercial, scientific or other professional diver certification or registration organizations Professional and technical diver training standards require a significantly higher skill level than recreational certification. Professional or technical training may include confidence training or stress training, where simulated emergencies are enacted, or unlikely contingencies are simulated, to develop divers' confidence in their abilities to safely manage contingencies. The amount of time spent on skill and confidence development is generally proportional to the length of the training program, as basic skills are usually learned fairly quickly.

=== Skills retention ===
Although many scuba skills are safety critical, most are straightforward and are easily retained once learned, given occasional practice. The routine skills that are exercised on most dives or every dive are usually well retained, but emergency skills may be seldom practiced outside of the training environment, and are consequently often poorly retained and inadequate in the face of a real emergency. Even in the training environment they are not often over-learned to the point of integrating with the diver's muscle memory. In many cases it is likely that if an emergency occurs during a dive under stressful conditions, the diver will be unable to manage the challenge safely. Refresher training is recommended by some training agencies when the diver has not dived for an arbitrary period of time, such as six months, but the actual need for relearning is not so easily identified. Checkout dives are a common requirement of service providers for divers without a convincing logbook showing recent appropriate experience.

== See also ==
- Surface-supplied diving skills – Underwater diving procedures
- Diving procedures – Standard underwater diving protocols
