= Downline (diving) =

Rope from the surface to an underwater workplace

In underwater diving, a downline is a piece of substantial cordage running from a point at the surface to the underwater workplace, and kept under some tension. It can be used as a guideline for divers descending or ascending, for depth control in blue-water diving, and as a guide for transfer of tools and equipment between surface and diver by sliding them along the downline at the end of a messenger line. A shotline is a special case of downline which uses a heavy weight at the bottom and a float at the top. A jackstay is a more lateral equivalent, that commonly follows a surface, and will not usually allow materials transfer without a messenger line from the destination end.

== Arrangement and use ==
There is no definitive arrangement. A downline is a generic piece of support equipment that can be set up using available components and is defined by its function. The top end can be secured to any suitably secure point in an appropriate place. This can be a large float or buoy, the dive boat or diving platform, or other substantial item on the shore. The bottom end can be secured to any suitably secure point at or near the worksite, such as heavy structure, the actual bottom rock, a large weight or an anchor. Enough tension to keep the catenary suitable for use is needed, and that may not be very much for a near vertical line.

A downline used for open ocean diving is much the same as a shotline, but does not reach all the way to the bottom. An open-ocean downline is weighted at the bottom, and attached to a substantial float at the surface, which may be tethered to the boat. It may be marked at intervals by knots or loops, and may be attached to the decompression trapeze system. In some cases a sea anchor may be used to limit wind drift, particularly if attached to a boat with significant windage.

== Variations ==
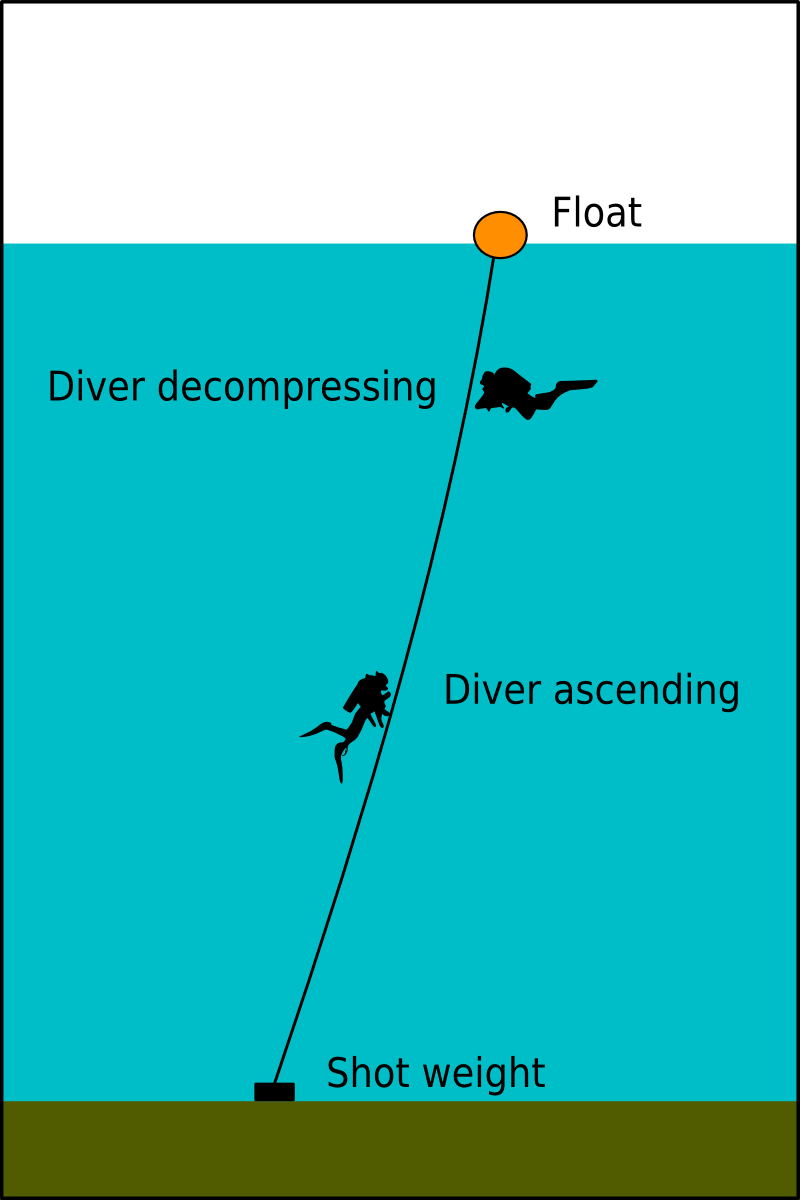
Divers ascending and decompressing using a shotline

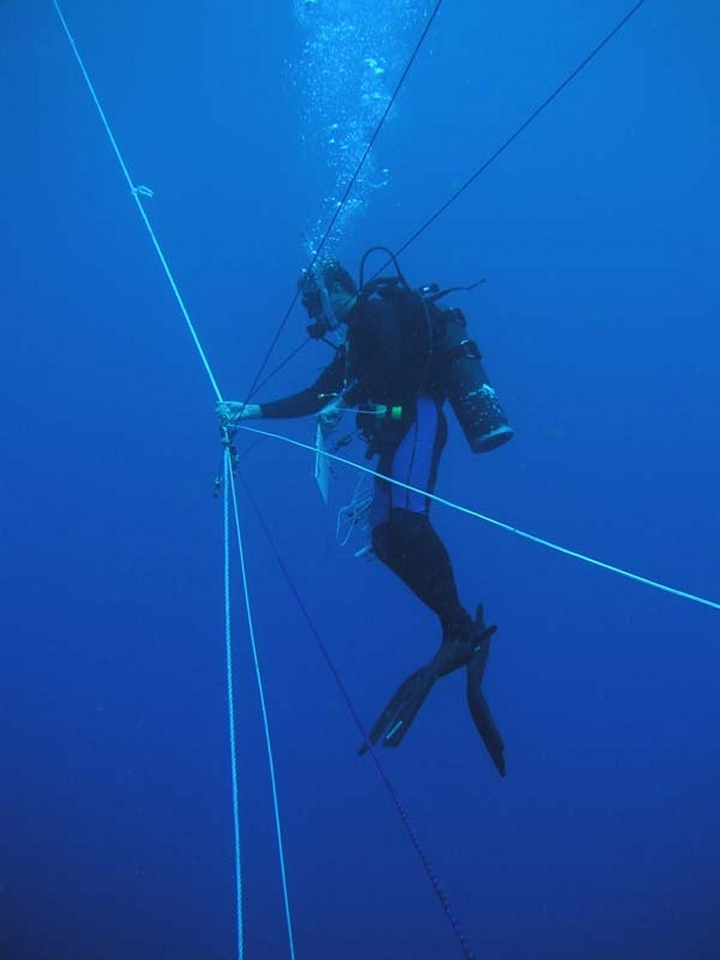
Marine scientist coordinates a blue water dive for 4 companions - each at the end of a rope tether and each rope kept taut by a weight and pulley system on the downline

- The anchor cable is commonly used by divers as a downline for ascent and descent. They may use granny lines from the entry point of the boat to the anchor cable as an aid for divers in currents, or low visibility. A basic granny line has a large, heavy shackle sliding over the anchor cable to tension it, and is tied off at the boarding area, usually at the stern of the boat. Divers entering the water at the stern of the vessel will be down-current of the anchor cable, but can use the granny line to pull themselves to the downline, which takes less effort than swimming up-current. On the return the anchor cable and granny line will guide the diver to the exit ladder or platform.
- Shotlines are near-vertical downlines that use a weight at the bottom and a float at the top. Several methods can be used for tension control when needed.
- A lazy shot, blue-water downline, or midwater downline, is a weighted line supported by a large float or boat, which does not extend all the way to the bottom, and is used for blue-water diving work, usually by scientific divers on scuba.

== See also ==
- Buddy line – A tether between two scuba divers to prevent separation in low visibility
- Distance line – Line deployed by scuba divers for navigation
- Diving equipment – Equipment used to facilitate underwater diving
- Decompression equipment – Equipment used by divers to facilitate decompression
- Jackstay (diving) – Substantial underwater guide line
- Jersey upline – A buoyed line serving as a position control during decompression
- Jonline – A short line used by scuba divers to clip themselves to something
- Lifeline (diving) – A rope connecting the diver to an attendant, usually at the surface
- Messenger line – Light line used to pull heavier cable or lower a package along a downline
