= Omar Samra =

Egyptian mountain climber

- Born: 11 August 1978 (age 48); Wimbledon, London, England
- Occupations: Adventurer, mountaineer, entrepreneur, motivational speaker, writer

Omar Samra (born 11 August 1978) is an Egyptian adventurer, entrepreneur, motivational speaker, and analogue astronaut. He is known as the first Egyptian to summit Mount Everest and the first Egyptian to complete the Explorers Grand Slam, which consists of climbing the highest peak on each continent and skiing to both the North and South Poles. Samra is also active in adventure travel entrepreneurship, hospitality, conservation initiatives, and research related to human performance in extreme environments, especially space.

== Early years ==
Samra was born in Wimbledon, London, and moved to Cairo shortly after birth. During childhood, he suffered from severe chest asthma that limited his physical activity. On medical advice, he began structured athletic training, which contributed to the gradual resolution of his condition. A formative experience occurred during his early adolescence when he won his school’s annual 800-metre race after previously finishing near last the year before, an event he has cited as influential in shaping his outlook on resilience and self-development.

As a teenager, Samra competed in squash and basketball at Gezira Sporting Club in Cairo. He won the American University in Cairo inter-university basketball championship in 1996 and later continued competitive amateur basketball in the United Kingdom while working in finance. At the age of 16, he was introduced to mountaineering during a trip to the Swiss Alps, where he first encountered snow and developed the long-term ambition to climb Mount Everest.

== Career ==
=== Education, professional and expedition career ===
Samra completed his secondary education at El Alsson School in Cairo and earned a Bachelor of Arts with honors in Economics, with a minor in Business Administration, from the American University in Cairo. He began his professional career at HSBC through its investment banking graduate program, working in London and Hong Kong on mergers and acquisitions, debt finance, bond origination, and loan syndication across European, Middle Eastern, and Asia-Pacific markets.

=== Early expeditions ===
In 2001, Samra undertook a solo, unsupported cycling journey across Andalusia, Spain, an experience that deepened his interest in long-form, self-supported travel. In December 2002, he resigned from investment banking and embarked on a 370-day journey through Asia and Latin America, traveling on a limited daily budget across 14 countries. During this period, he engaged in high-altitude trekking in the Himalayas and mountaineering in the Andes, summiting peaks in Bolivia and Peru. He has since traveled to more than 80 countries.

After returning to finance briefly, Samra enrolled in the MBA program at London Business School, concentrating on entrepreneurship. While studying, he joined a four-member university expedition team attempting Mount Everest.

=== Mount Everest ===
On 17 May 2007, after a 60-day expedition, Samra successfully reached the summit of Mount Everest, becoming the first Egyptian and, at the time, the youngest Arab to do so.

Following Everest, Samra returned to Egypt and increasingly focused on public speaking and adventure-related initiatives. Between 2007 and 2009, he worked in private equity at Actis, concentrating on emerging markets, before transitioning fully into entrepreneurship and expedition work.

=== Seven summits ===
Between 2007 and 2013, Samra completed the Seven Summits, becoming the first Egyptian to do so. He later skied to the Geographic South Pole in December 2014 and completed a ski to the Geographic North Pole in April 2015, thereby completing the Explorers Grand Slam. He is the first Egyptian and among a small group globally to achieve this distinction.

=== Space journey ===
In December 2013, Samra was selected as one of the winners of a global competition organized by XCOR Aerospace and AXE, chosen from over two million applicants worldwide to fly aboard the Lynx Mark II suborbital spacecraft. He was the only Arab among the winners. The selection process included a final stage at the Kennedy Space Center, where candidates completed zero-gravity flights, fighter jet maneuvers, physical obstacle courses, and exams in physics and space science, with a committee chaired by astronaut Buzz Aldrin. Following his selection, Samra underwent astronaut training covering high-G force environments, spaceflight physiology, and mission preparation protocols.In 2017, XCOR Aerospace filed for bankruptcy, resulting in the cancellation of the planned Lynx Mark II flights.

Samra has continued his involvement in human spaceflight research through other channels. In 2016, he was selected as a citizen-science astronaut candidate with Project PoSSUM (Polar Suborbital Science in the Upper Mesosphere), a research and education program that trains scientist-astronauts to study the upper atmosphere on future suborbital missions. In 2018, he served as Vice Commander on Lunares III, a 15-day moon-analogue mission at the Lunares Research Station in Poland focused on studying lunar habitability. In that role, he supported a crew of scientists and researchers in conducting their experiments and was responsible for maintaining the team's physical and mental wellbeing throughout the confined mission.

In response to the cancellation of his own flight, Samra launched Make Space Yours, a multi-year initiative aimed at helping others pursue the path to space that he had been unable to complete. The program focused on space awareness and education for university and school students across Egypt.

=== Antarctica expedition ===
In January 2017, Samra led an expedition to Antarctica’s Ellsworth Mountains, where he completed three first ascents, later named Mount Samra, Mount Marwa, and Mount Teela, after his family, and established six new climbing routes.

=== Major climbing routes ===
Samra’s mountaineering record includes ascents of Mount Everest and all Seven Summits, prominent peaks in the Andes like Alpamayo and Artesunraju, as well as first ascents in Antarctica’s Ellsworth Mountains. His Antarctic expedition in 2017 resulted in the naming of three previously unclimbed peaks and the establishment of multiple new technical routes in one of the continent’s most remote regions.

=== Film work ===
Samra’s expeditions have been documented in various media productions. His attempted unsupported transatlantic rowing expedition in 2017, undertaken with professional triathlete Omar Nour, was documented in the feature-length film Beyond the Raging Sea, directed by Marco Orsini. The expedition ended after approximately 1000 kilometres when their vessel capsized and the life raft didn’t open during severe weather, leaving the pair in the ocean for approximately 12 hours before rescue by a cargo ship. The film also helps raise awareness about the plight of refugees crossing dangerous seas.

The documentary first screened to wide acclaim at Cannes Film Festival as a work in progress in 2018, then premiered at the El Gouna Film Festival in 2019 and was subsequently screened at the Cairo International Film Festival and the Monaco Streaming Film Festival. It later received theatrical releases in Egypt and the United Arab Emirates in 2021, followed by cinema runs in the United Kingdom and the United States in 2024, and became available on international streaming platforms.

== Philanthropy and advocacy ==
In 2013, following the death of his wife, Marwa Fayed, Samra founded Marwa Fayed’s Toy Run (ran from 2013 to 2023), a charitable initiative focused on collecting and redistributing used toys to children in need while promoting sustainability. The organization has distributed more than 100,000 toys in ten countries over ten years, and received MBC Al-Amal’s Humanitarian Project of the Year award.

Samra is a goodwill ambassador for UNHCR, and previously served as goodwill amabassador of UNDIP with a focus on environmental conservation, youth empowerment, and refugee rights. He has also served on the board of Equality Now, an international organization advocating for gender justice and legal reform. He is an honorary ambassador to Nepal, having travelled to the country over 25 times and supported tourism development there.

== Personal life ==
Samra was married to Marwa Fayed, who died in 2013. He has spoken publicly about the impact of personal loss on his later philanthropic and professional priorities. They have one daughter, Teela. He remarried in 2021 and divorced in 2024.
