= Messenger line =

Light line used to pull heavier cable or lower a package along a downline

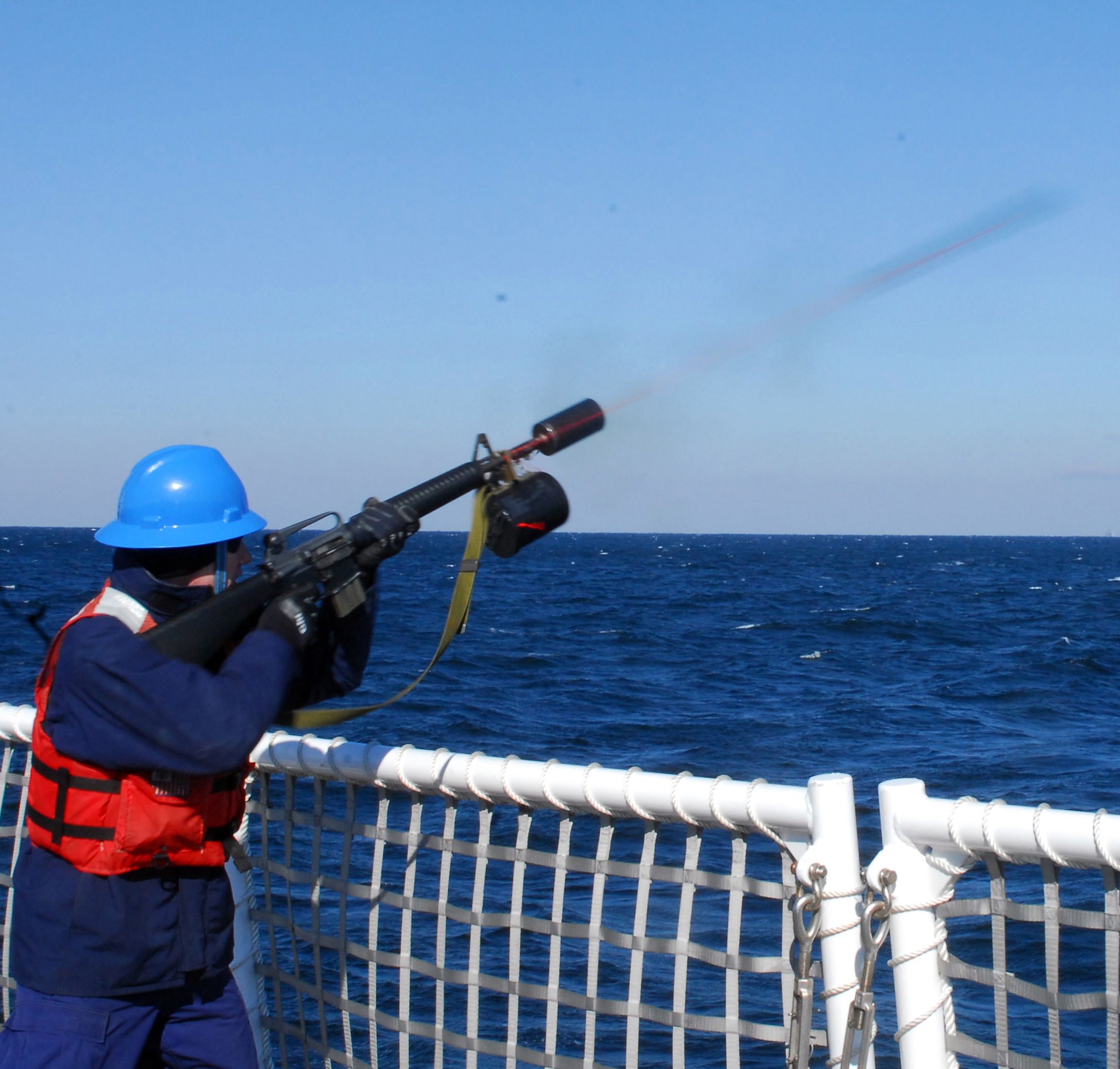
A USCG sailor uses a specially adapted firearm to fire a messenger line to another vessel.

A messenger line or just messenger is relatively light cordage used to pull a heavier cable across a gap or through a tube or duct. The term is also used for a line used to pull or lower a package along a downline or jackstay.

A heaving line is a rope with a weighted end which can be thrown relatively easily across a gap. If it is attached to a heavier line, warp, or chain and then used to pull the heavier line across the gap it is being used as a messenger line. The name heaving line refers to the function of pulling the line, and messenger line to the function of transferring the object it is fastened to.

== Applications ==
- A heaving line thrown from a ship to shore then used to pull the mooring warp from the ship to a bollard.
- A light line installed inside a mast during manufacture, which is later used to reeve a halyard or pull an electrical cable into place.
- A line used to lower a toolbag or equipment along a downline to a diver.
- A line used to lower a weight (messenger) along a taut line to trigger a mechanism. For example: to close the mouth of a towed sampling net.
