= Ascent rate =

Ascent rate is how fast something rises; it may apply to:

- Ascent rate (diving), in underwater diving, an important part of decompression, mainly affecting the fastest tissues.
- Meteorological instrumentation balloons.

== See also ==
- Rate of climb
- Lapse rate
