= Omar Nour =

Egyptian triathlete (born 1978)

Omar Nour is an Egyptian professional triathlete on the International Triathlon Union (ITU) circuit, adventurer and entrepreneur.

== Early life and family ==
Nour was born on December 9, 1978, in Cairo, Egypt. His family re-located to Lausanne, Switzerland in 1981 where Nour and his brother Diaa were enrolled in boarding schools, becoming fluent in Arabic, French and English, and conversational in German. In 1992, Nour's family relocated again to the United States where he continued his education. Upon graduation from high school, he enrolled in The Johns Hopkins University, with a triple-major in French, Near Eastern Studies and Biology, with a pre-medical concentration. After graduation from Hopkins, Nour began growing various small business ventures. It was a familial venture, that permanently removed Omar from the medical track. In 2006, Nour and his brother Diaa formed a telecommunications firm, Tot Solutions.

== Career ==
According to Nour, it was on a dare from a friend, that he entered a local triathlon in 2007 (the Nations Triathlon in Washington, D.C.) in a bid to lose weight. Over the next three years, he lost 70 lb and earned his pro card to race on the 2010 ITU season, racing under the flag of Egypt and the Egyptian Triathlon Federation (ETF). Nour raced professionally from 2010 to 2016, under coach Neal Henderson out of Boulder, Colorado.

After scoring Egypt's first ever ITU Olympic triathlon points, having a broken ankle and herniated disk in his back meant Nour missed out on the chance to qualify for the Rio 2016 Olympic Games.

Shortly after missing out on the Olympic Games, Nour was approached by Egyptian adventurer, Omar Samra to take on a 3,000 nautical mile unsupported row across the Atlantic Ocean, from La Gomera in the Spanish Canary Islands to Antigua. Nour and Samra set off on their Atlantic crossing on 14 December 2017. After rowing for 9 days, their boat capsized and failed to self-right. Nour and Samra were rescued, in Great White Shark hunting territory, many hours later by a cargo ship.

In May 2018, Nour and Samra announced Beyond the Raging Sea, a film by director Marco Orsini about their attempt to cross the Atlantic. The documentary draws awareness of the plight of many refugees who are forced to cross an ocean in a desperate bid for safe refuge. The film was featured in the 71st Cannes Film Festival.
