= El Alsson School =

El Alsson British & American International School

Location
- NEWGIZA KM 22 Cairo-Alex Road, Imbaba; Giza, 12411; Egypt

Information
- Type: Private international school
- Established: 1982
- Director: Colin Rogers and Soumaya Amr
- Grades: Preschool–12
- Age range: 3–18
- Houses: Karnak; Siwa; Thebes; Memphis
- Colours: Blue and Yellow
- Website: www.alsson.com

El Alsson British and American International School is a private international school in Giza, Egypt established in 1982. It offers a British section from Foundation Stage 1 (3 year olds) to IGCSE with a sixth form for AS and A-Levels (18 year olds), an International Baccalaureate (IB) program for DP1 and DP2 students, and an American section from Preschool to Grade 12 with an option of taking Advanced Placement (AP) courses. The school moved to its new campus in Newgiza.

== Extracurricular activities ==
=== Houses ===
The school has a house system consisting of four houses: Memphis (blue), Siwa (yellow), Thebes (red), and Memphis (green). In some school years, the houses in the secondary school were Horus (blue), Sekhmet (yellow), Anubis (black) and Sobek (green) referring to the ancient Egyptian gods. The houses compete in the Annual Alsson Library Quiz, Sports' Day, Rugby matches and football matches and different quizzes.

=== School council ===
The School Council represents the student body. The council is constituted of representatives from every class. The council is not politically aligned and does not involve itself in the day-to-day running of affairs of the school but is active in organizing charity events, bake sales and other events.

== Facilities ==
The school has a library known as the 'Eileen Lucas Library', used for recreational and research purposes and has a media room adjacent to it.

== Notable alumni ==
- Fadwa El Gallal, journalist
- Omar Samra, adventurer, entrepreneur, and speaker
