= Fadwa El Gallal =

Libyan-American news anchor and journalist

- Born: Fadwa Gallal; Boston
- Citizenship: Libya
- Education: El Alsson School; American University in Cairo
- Occupations: Journalist; news anchor
- Employers: Al-Aan TV; Al-Arabiya; Alhurra

Fadwa El Gallal, also Fadwa Gallal (Arabic: فدوى القلال) is a Libyan–American news anchor and journalist. She was born in Boston, USA, to a family originally from Benghazi. She lived in Egypt, where she studied at El Alsson School, then at the American University in Cairo. She worked for Al-Aan TV from 2013 to 2014 before moving in 2016 to work for Al-Arabiya. In 2018, she moved positions to work for Alhurra, a US-based television station that broadcasts to the Arab world.
