= Diving shot =

Substantial weighted near-vertical line with buoy

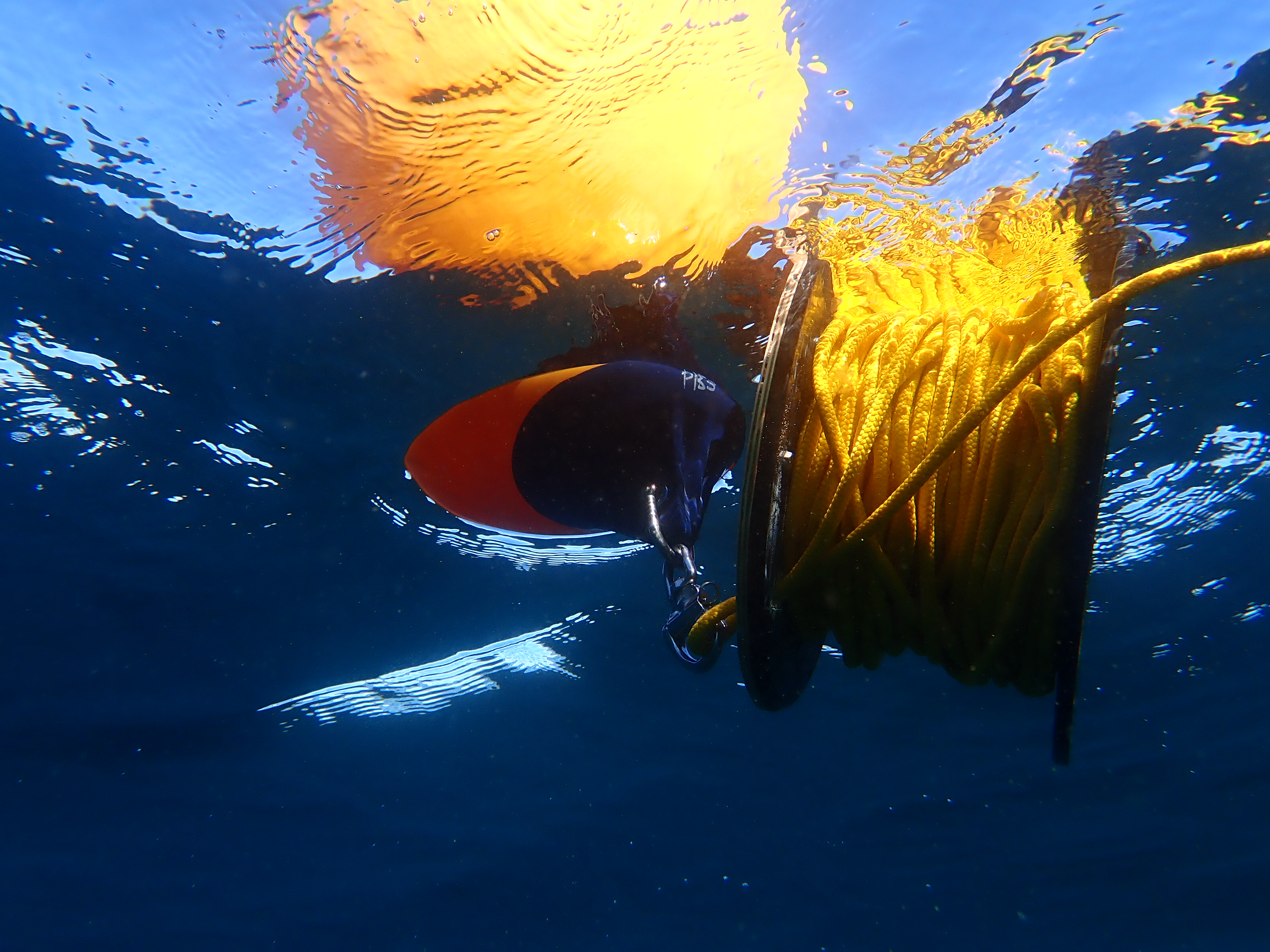
- Buoy and reel of diving shotline deployed
- Other names: Diving shot-line; Shotline
- Uses: Marking a dive site and providing a stable reference for the divers to descend and ascend

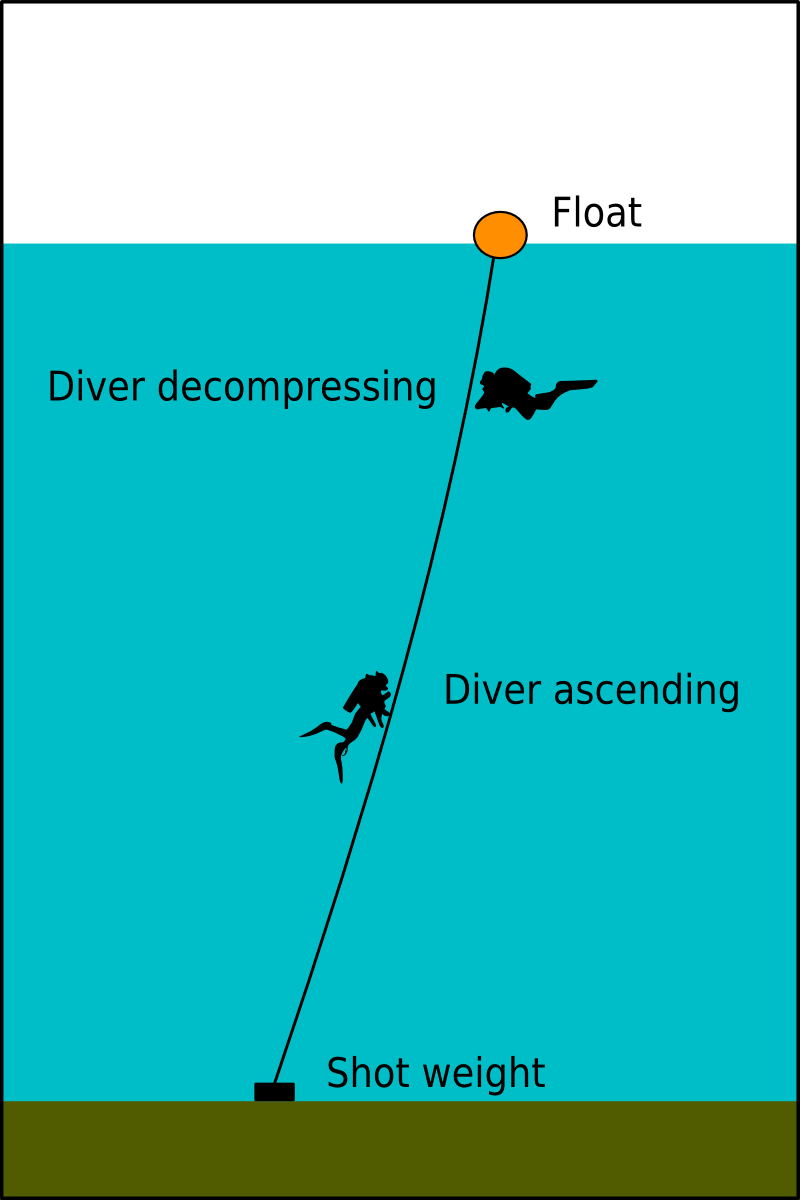
Divers ascending and decompressing on a basic shotline: Weight, and float connected by a line of fixed length

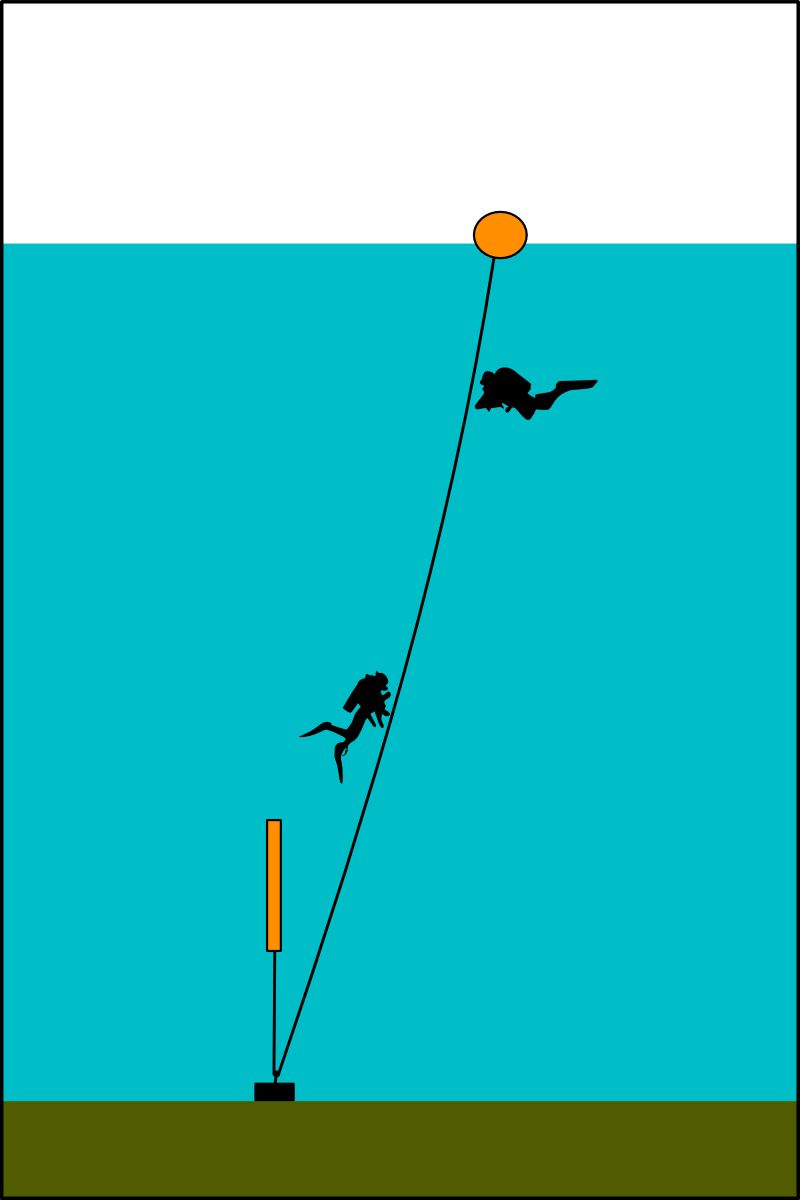
Bottom tensioned shotline: The line passes through a ring at the weight and is tensioned by a small float, often a small lift bag which can later help lift the shot as the air expands.

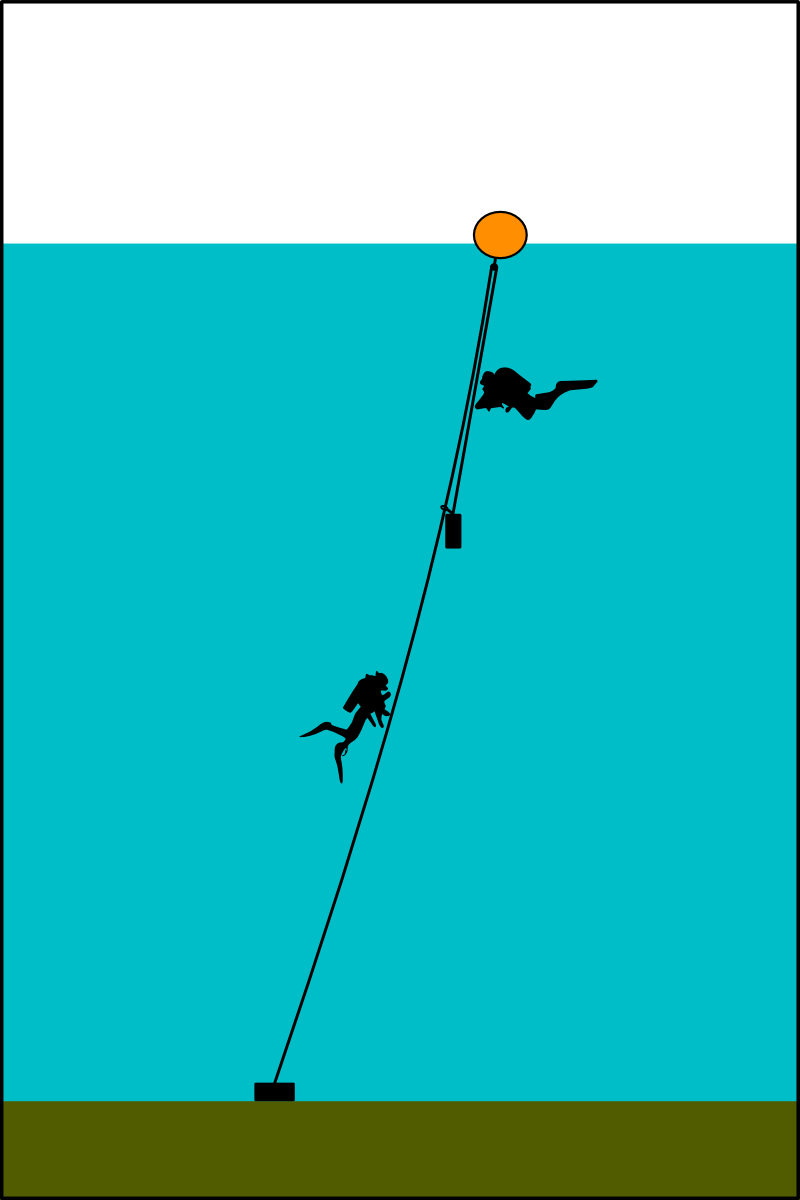
Top tensioned shotline: The line passes through a ring at the float and is tensioned by a smaller weight hanging from it. This weight may be hooked to the main part of the line by a sliding clip to restrain it from swinging.

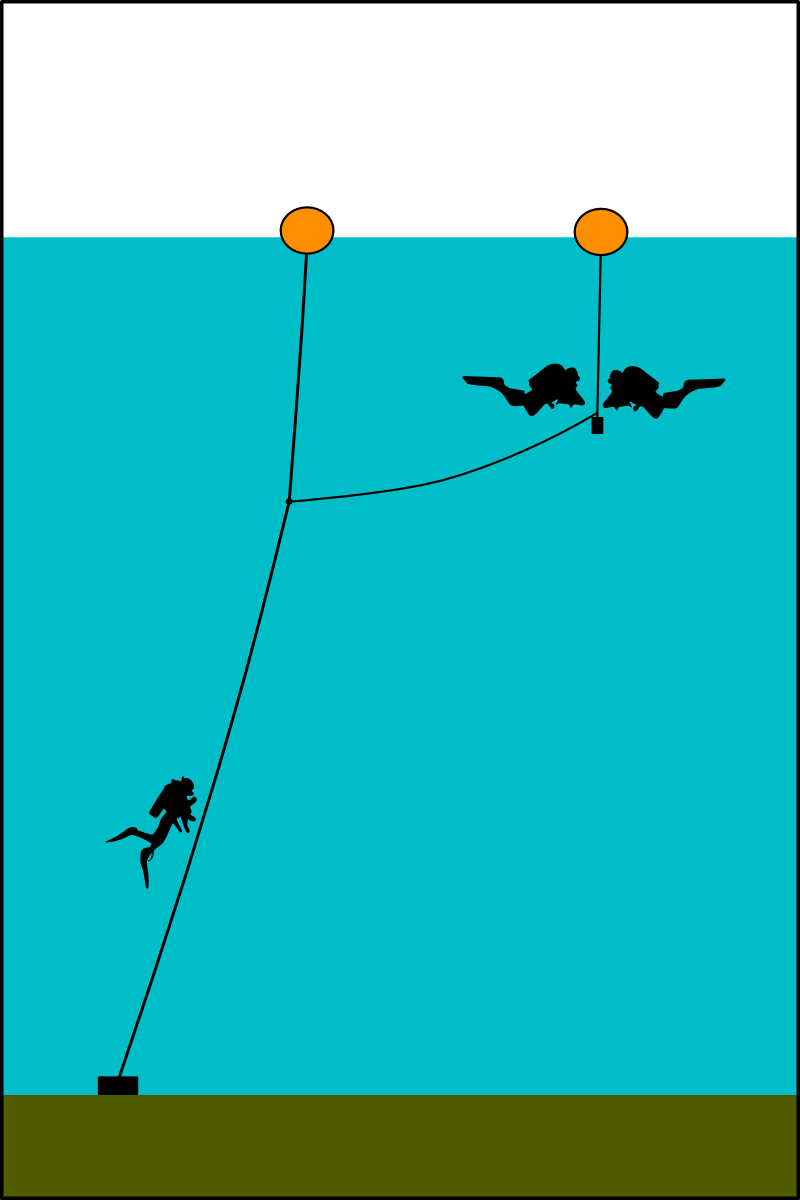
A shotline with a lazy shot - a second float with a short weighted line tethered to it at just below the depth of the deepest long decompression stop.

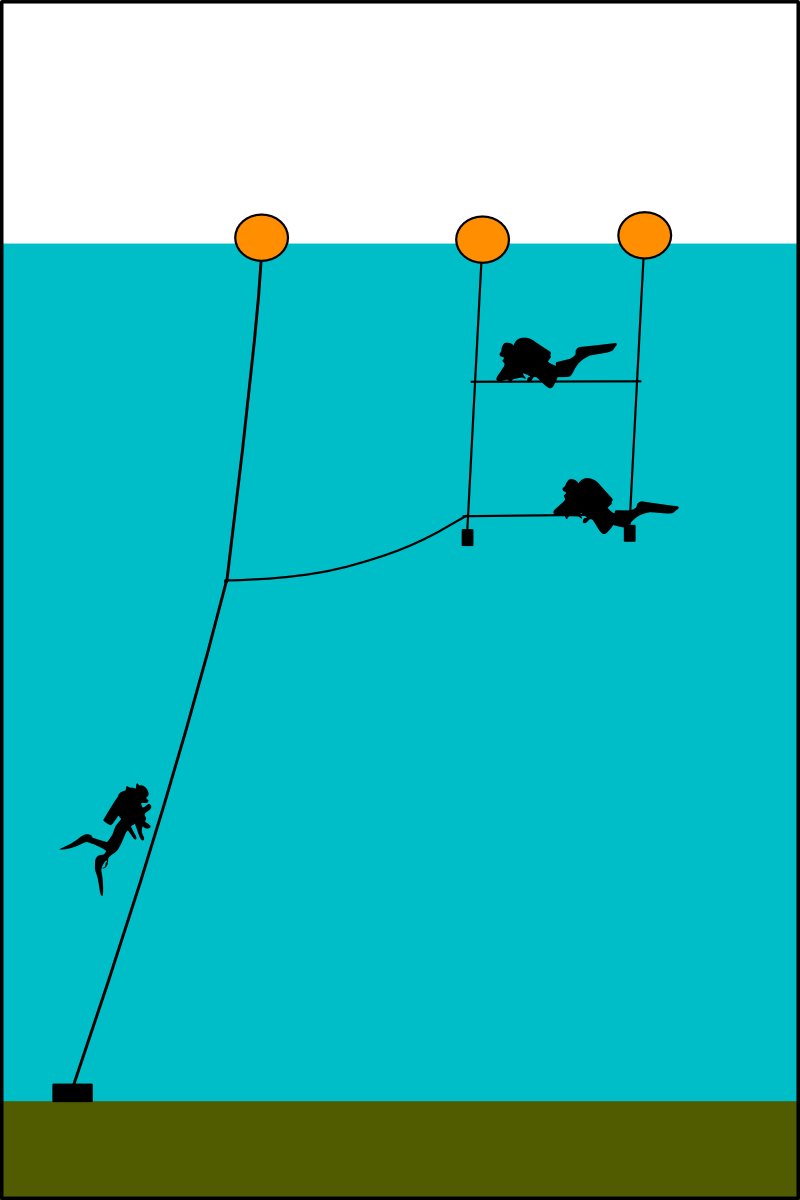
A shotline with a decompression trapeze - a series of crossbars suspended from a float at each end and ballasted as necessary, tethered to the main shotline.

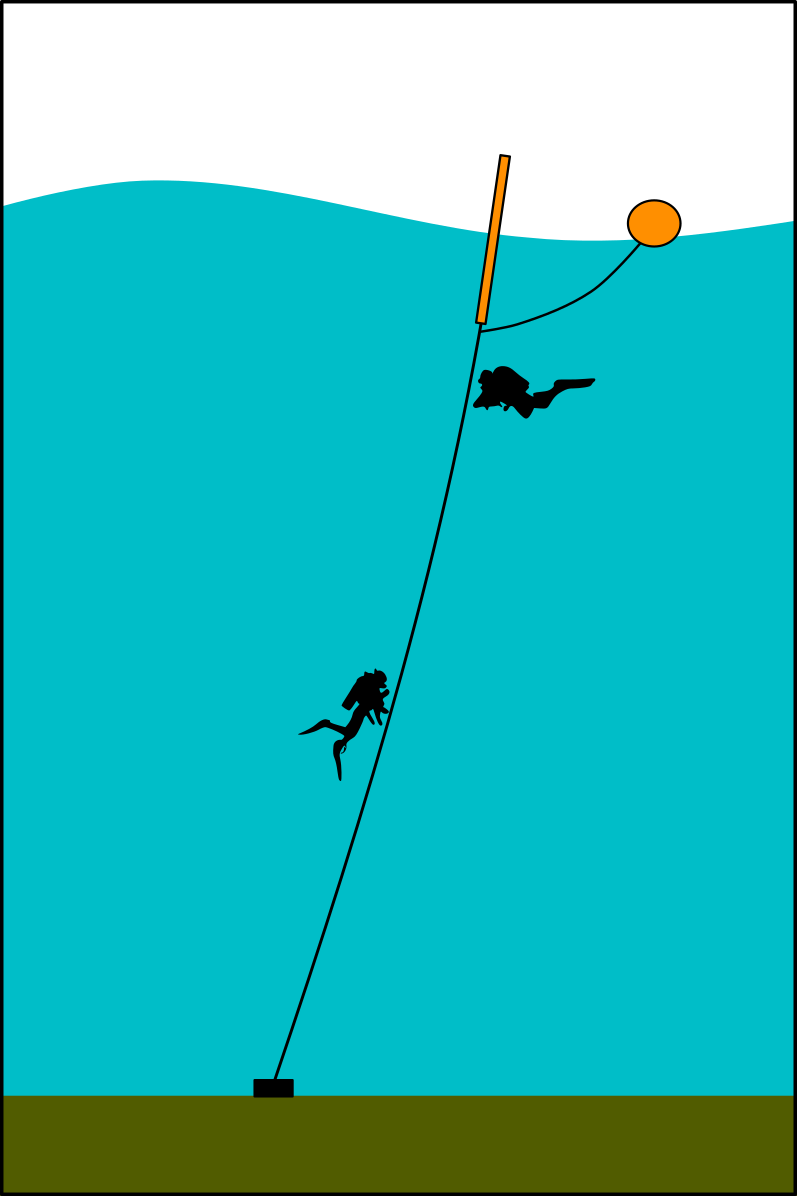
A shotline with spar buoy to reduce vertical movement near the surface in a seaway

A diving shot line, shot line, or diving shot, a type of downline or descending line (US Navy), is an item of diving equipment consisting of a ballast weight (the shot), a line and a buoy. The weight is dropped on the dive site. The line connects the weight and the buoy and is used by divers to as a visual and tactile reference to move between the surface and the dive site more safely and more easily, and as a controlled position for in-water staged decompression stops. It may also be used to physically control rate of descent and ascent, particularly by surface-supplied divers.

A "lazy shot" is a shot which is suspended above the bottom. It may be tethered to the main shot line at a convenient depth. It is used for decompression and frees the main shot line for other divers. The lazy shot's line does not need to be longer than the decompression depth and is often only deep enough for the longer stops. It only needs a weight heavy enough to provide diver buoyancy control and sufficient buoyancy to avoid being dragged down under reasonably foreseeable circumstances.

== Purposes ==
The shot has several purposes. The basic purpose to facilitate control of descent and ascent rate by the diver, and to control the location of the diver during descent and ascent. The line is useful for divers in conditions of low visibility or strong tides where underwater navigation between the surface and the dive site is difficult or on deep dives where a navigation error would dramatically reduce useful underwater time. Divers can use the line to help buoyancy control, to ease long decompression stops and to prevent drift when ascending in a current.

The buoy marks the dive site for the people on the surface, who are generally on the dive boat, who provide safety cover for the divers. This helps them focus on the place where the divers are likely to return to the surface and helps them return to the dive site more quickly after the boat has moved away from the site.

== Configuration ==
Several configurations are in general use, depending on the conditions.

=== Basic shotline ===
The basic shotline has a line fixed to the weight and the float, and does not compensate for depth changes. This is adequate in many circumstances, and has the advantage of simplicity. If there is any current or wind, the buoy will drift until tension in the line prevents further movement. Large waves will cause the buoy and the top end of the line to bob up and down, jerking on the line.

=== Bottom tensioned shotline ===
A bottom tensioned shotline controls the tension of the line in one of two ways:

- A length of fairly heavy chain may be used between the bottom of the line and the shot. This chain should be long enough to take up any depth variations due to tides or waves. The weight of the chain pulls down on the shotline whenever part of the chain is off the bottom, maintaining some tension, but the tension varies depending on the amount of chain lifted. The length of line must be adjusted so that some chain is always suspended, but never all.
- The other method is to run the line through a loop on the weight and attach it to a small float which will pull up on the line to maintain tension. the float must either be sufficiently rigid to withstand the pressure, or an open bag inflated at the bottom by a diver. When this method is used a heavier shot is generally necessary, as the lift from the buoyancy of the float is doubled by the mechanical advantage of passing the line through the loop.

=== Top tensioned shotline ===
Top tensioning is achieved by running the line through a loop on the buoy and hanging a small weight on the end. This weight will hang down and double its weight will pull on the float due to the mechanical advantage of the system. This is not usually a major problem, as it is relatively easy to get a buoy of adequate volume.

The top tensioning system also prevents the line from being pulled up and down by wave action, but instead there is a tensioning weight going up and down twice as much as the buoy, which can be hazardous when the divers are in the depth range of its motion.

=== Lazy shot ===
A lazy shot is a shotline that does not reach the bottom. The weight hangs suspended from the surface and the line is used to provide a decompression station. A lazy shot may be hung from a buoy, a boat or a structure as circumstances warrant. Though it is not an essential part of the lazy shot, it is often used with a full depth shotline, or when the anchor rope is used as a substitute for a shotline, as it provides a more stable vertical reference than the anchor line, which tends to shift considerably as the boat moves under the influence of wind and wave. When used with the full shotline, the lazy shot provides a place away from the bubbles of other divers where the divers can decompress, and keeps them clear of the shotline if it is used by other divers. The lazy shot may be tethered to the main shotline and unclipped to drift after the last diver has reached it.

=== Decompression trapeze ===
A decompression trapeze is a horizontal bar or series of horizontal bars supported at the appropriate decompression stop depths, and provides controlled place for a group of divers to decompress in the water in relative comfort and in less crowded conditions than on a shotline.Construction is basically two lines suspended from the surface, by buoys, a boat, or a structure. The transverse bars are connected to the lines at the depths appropriate to the planned decompression stops, though usually a trapeze is not used for stops of only a few minutes, so several stops may be completed before the diver reaches the trapeze. Spreading the divers out across the current allows them to hold on without getting in each other's way, and lets the bubbles go past without obstructing the other divers' view or disturbing their buoyancy. The bars must either be inherently negatively buoyant or ballasted so that the hang below the surface at the correct depth, and it is common to provide enough weight to compensate for minor irregularities in diver buoyancy control. The decompression trapeze is generally associated with a shotline, and if it is not close-coupled to the shotline, by using the shotline as one of the suspension lines, there will be a line from the shotline to the lowest bar of the trapeze, which will be either horizontal, or slope upwards toward the trapeze, so the divers can follow it without ascending above their decompression ceiling.

When a decompression bar is used in a strong current, it may be convenient for the last diver to unclip it from the shotline, so it drifts at the speed of the current, and the drag on the divers is eliminated. The chase boat would accompany the drifting trapeze which would be clearly identified by the supporting buoys.

Some dive teams will hang a spare cylinder of decompression gas on the trapeze, where it will be on hand in case of an emergency. This would normally be pressurised but with a closed valve, so that current pressure on the demand valve will not cause a free flow. More than one second stage can be fitted to allow more than one diver to use it at the same time.

=== Spar buoy ===
A high volume buoy with a large waterplane area such as a sphere or short cylinder will try to follow the wave profile, this will produce a cyclic jerking load near the surface, making it difficult to maintain a consistent depth at the stops. A spar buoy with a small waterplane area will dip into the water as each wave crest passes, with a far lower variation of tension on the shotline, so divers holding on will be more comfortable. If the spar buoy has insufficient volume for safety, a larger volume buoy can linked to it on a short tether as a backup.

== Construction ==
Typically the weight is lead or iron, and weighs around 20 kg (44 lb). To prevent the assembly sinking and being lost, the buoy should provide more buoyancy than is required to make the complete system float. For example, if a 20 kg/44 lb weight is used, the buoy must provide more than 20 kg buoyancy: it needs to be more than 20 litres/4.4 gallons in volume, as it must also support its own weight.

Some agencies and codes of practice recommend a buoy that can not be dragged underwater by the divers relying on it for depth control. In surface-supplied diving this may be a considerable weight if diving heavy.

If used in a current, the shot must be prevented from being dragged away. This can be done by attaching it to a small anchor by a short line. Another method used is to tie the shot off to an object on the bottom by a thin line, which can be either released by the last diver, or broken when the shotline is recovered.

The line should be longer than the depth of the dive site at the deepest state of the tide during the dive, and at least 10 mm (0.4 inch) in diameter. A thick line is used because the shot weight is often lifted by pulling the line by hand and the pressure of a thin line can cause pain and injury to the hands when the shot is recovered.

Floating line, such as polypropylene, although cheap, can foul the propellers of boats and is an entanglement hazard to divers if it is allowed to accumulate near the surface. There are several ways of avoiding this:

- coil the excess line after deployment, this can be done on a storage and deployment reel.
- use a "top tensioning" arrangement: the line runs freely through a ring on the buoy and is weighted at the top end by a small weight
- use a "bottom tensioning" arrangement: the line runs freely through a ring on the weight and is lifted at the bottom end by a small, rigid buoy.

Line which sinks will accumulate excess length at the bottom which may snag, making recovery of the shot difficult or impossible. In most cases a small amount of wind or current will put some tension on the line, which can put the buoy an inconvenient horizontal distance from the shot.

A large float will go up and down with the passing waves. This can be disconcerting and inconvenient for the divers if they need to hold onto it in a current, as they will to some extent go up and down with the line. This effect is minimised if a small diameter spar buoy is used as the primary buoy to tension the line, as it will tend to react less to the waves, with a large volume safety buoy on a short tether, which will prevent the spar buoy from being dragged down if the tension gets too much.

If a large float is used the divers can clip off to the shotline using a jonline, a short length of rope or webbing with a clip or loop that will hold one end to the shotline, allowing the diver to hold the other end at a short distance downstream. Vertical movements of the clipped end are absorbed by the horizontal length of the jonline.

== Deployment ==
Various methods can be used to deploy a shotline. The shot is normally dropped first and should sink vertically, pulling the line down after it. The float is usually thrown in last. There are different methods of deploying the line so that it pays out smoothly and without snagging. These include unrolling from a reel and running out from a box, bucket or bag into which it was flaked or coiled in preparation. When sufficient line has run out, the remaining line can be secured on the reel with some slack to allow for tide, current and waves. If there is strong current and the site is deep some allowance must be made for drift during the drop. and a heavier shot which sinks faster and drags less is an advantage.

== Recovery ==
The simplest method of recovery is to simply pull the line up by hand, but his can be hard work and should not be done by a diver with decompression stress. Various winches and capstans can be used if available, and if set up for the maneuver, towing the line through an eye on a large float can work well. Alternatively a lift bag at the shot can be partly inflated by a diver. This will inflate further during the lift and may even completely support the shot after it has risen sufficiently and the air has expanded enough.

== Using shots ==
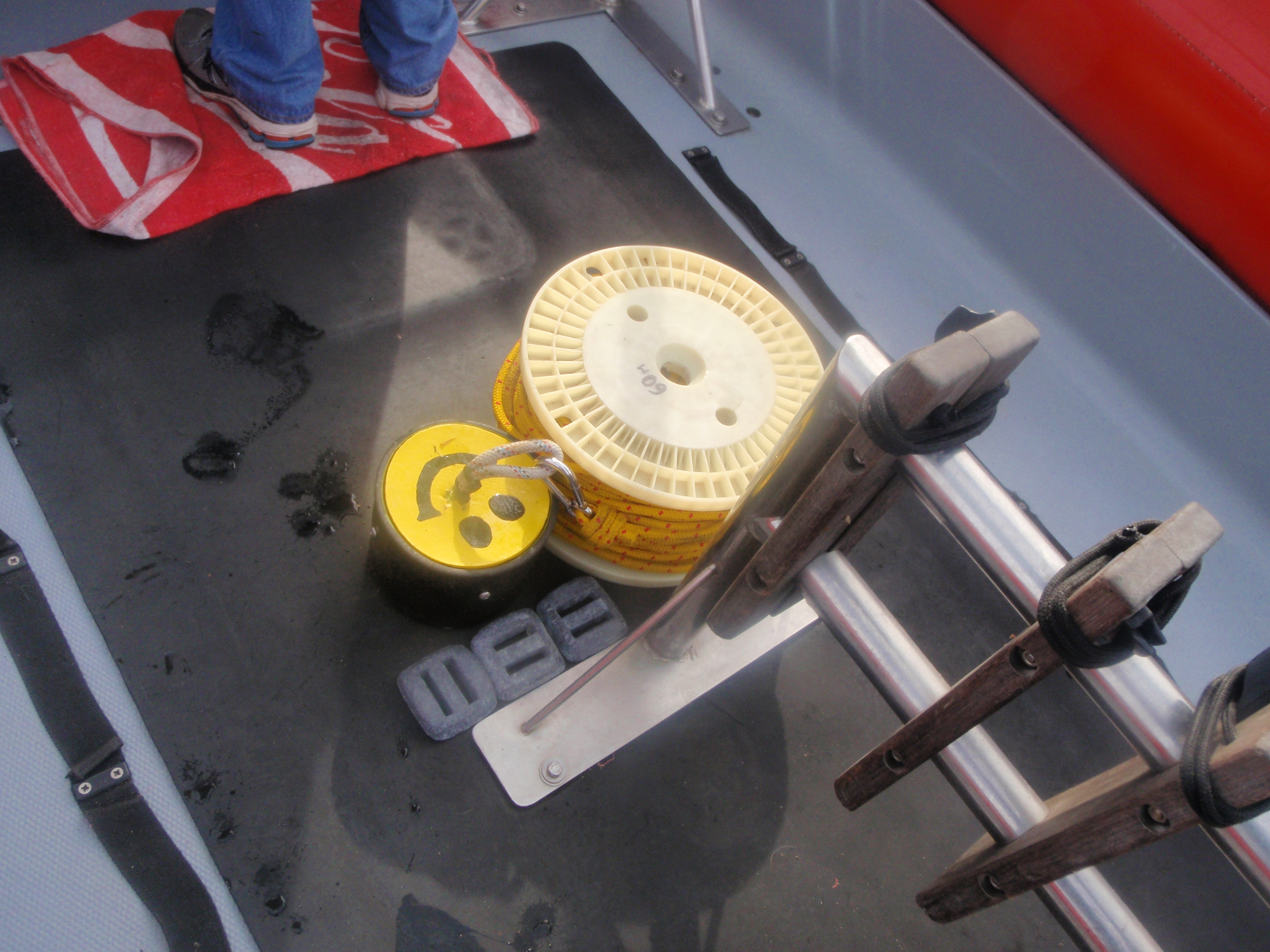
Shot, line and reel on dive boat

The shot is deployed, generally from a boat, after the dive site is located using position fixing such as GPS and an echo sounder.

Shots are more difficult to use in strong currents. The weight may drag along the seabed especially if the divers pull on the line as they descend. To avoid this the shot is often positioned upstream of an obstruction at the dive site so the obstruction prevents it dragging. A further problem is caused by diving at slack water; the direction of the current reverses during slack, so although the weight may be securely up current of the obstruction before slack, after the tide turns the weight is down current of the obstruction and may drag.

At the surface, the direction of the current is indicated by three signs at the buoy: the direction of the line to the weight, a "horseshoe" bow-wave on the front of the buoy and a wake at the back of the buoy.

Sometimes, two buoys are used at the surface. The second buoy can further indicate the strength and the direction of the current or be misleading because it may indicate the direction of the wind. A second buoy can be used to provide additional buoyancy if one buoy is dragged underwater.

Sometimes the line, once at the dive site on the seabed, is tied to the dive site to guard against the weight dragging away from the site. The line itself may be tied to the dive site or a thin "waster" line may attach the strong line to the dive site. If a waster is used, the boat at the surface can be used to break the waster at the end of diving before the shot is lifted. If the main line is attached to the dive site, the divers must untie it before ascending at the end of diving otherwise they lose their shot.

In a current, the buoy may be dragged under the surface by water resistance of the divers holding the line as they ascend and reach shallow water. If this happens divers will not want to descend with the buoy and will prefer to release the shot line and be swept away from the shot. In strong currents divers often decompress on decompression buoys instead of using a shot.

Sometimes, a lifting bag is attached to the weight and used to help raise the weight at the end of the dive.

== See also ==
- Decompression buoy – Inflatable surface marker buoy deployed from underwater
- Decompression equipment – Equipment used by divers to facilitate decompression
- Decompression practice – Techniques and procedures for safe decompression of divers
- Decompression trapeze – Horizontal bars suspended at decompression stop depths
- Downline (diving) – Rope from the surface to an underwater workplace
- Jackstay – Substantial line between two points used to guide or support
