= Jackstay =

Substantial line between two points used to guide or support

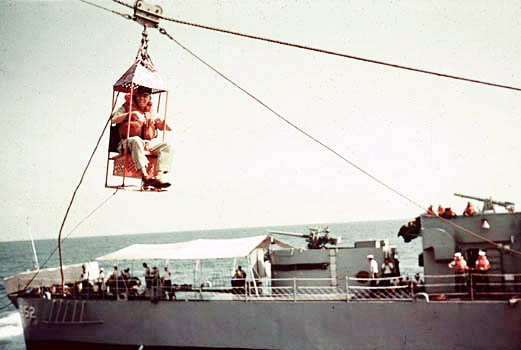
Personnel transfer from USS Rankin by highline, a form of jackstay, 1960.

A jackstay is a cable or bar between two points to support and guide a load between those points, or as an anchor to attach something to be constrained along that line. The term is mostly used in a marine context and originated on sailing ships. Note the use of the term 'stay' implies load bearing working rigging. In diving it is also a line to guide the movements of a diver between the endpoints.

== Nautical applications ==
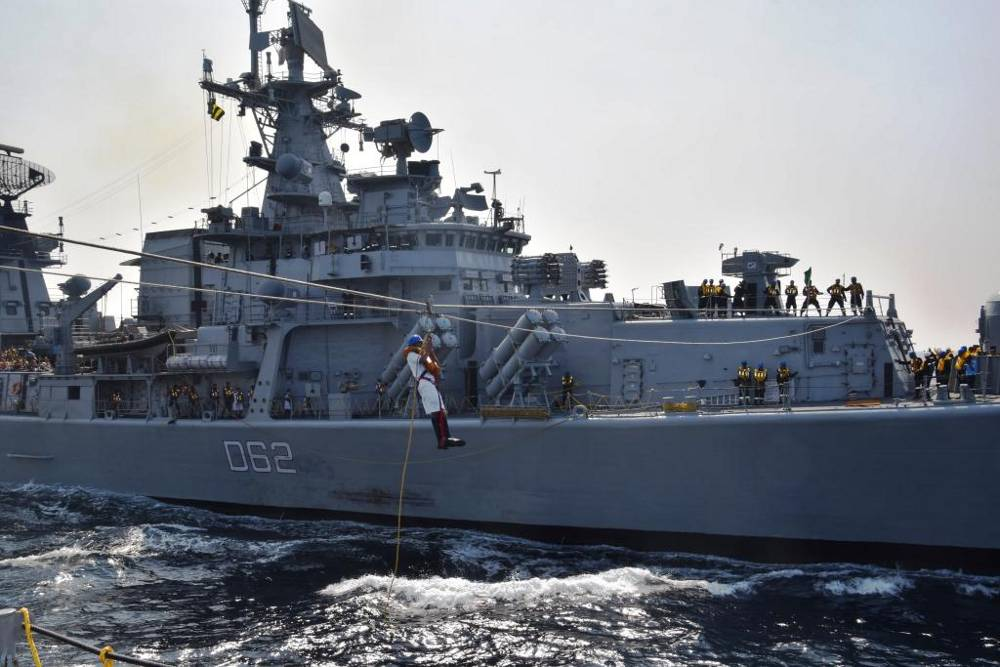
A jackstay between two ships of the Indian Navy

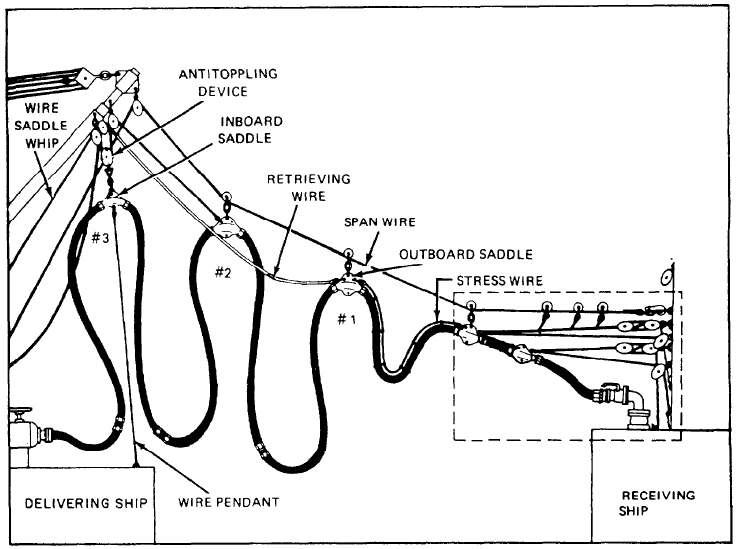
Form of jackstay (also called a spanwire) by the US Navy used to support a hose for refuelling at sea

Jackstays are used in several maritime applications. These include:

- Support and guidance for transfer of personnel and materials between vessels at sea (underway replenishment), suspended from a traveller block and controlled by lines running in both directions.
- Support and guidance for rescue or transport by breeches buoy,
- A rope or rod secured along a vessel's spar to attach an edge of a sail or the end of a gaff,
- A rope or rod running vertically on the forward side of the mast on which the yard moves.
- A stay for racing or cruising vessels used to steady the mast against the strain of the gaff.
- A line secured at both ends and tensioned, for use as a support for an awning.
- Can refer to a safety line for attaching a safety harness to arrest or prevent a fall, commonly used on sailing yachts, and a requirement on racing yachts, where they are used to reduce the risk of going overboard while working on deck. This line should be properly called a jackline. In this application a webbing strap is often used as it will not roll underfoot. Also recently used on the yards of square rigged training vessels (wire rope).

== Diving jackstay ==
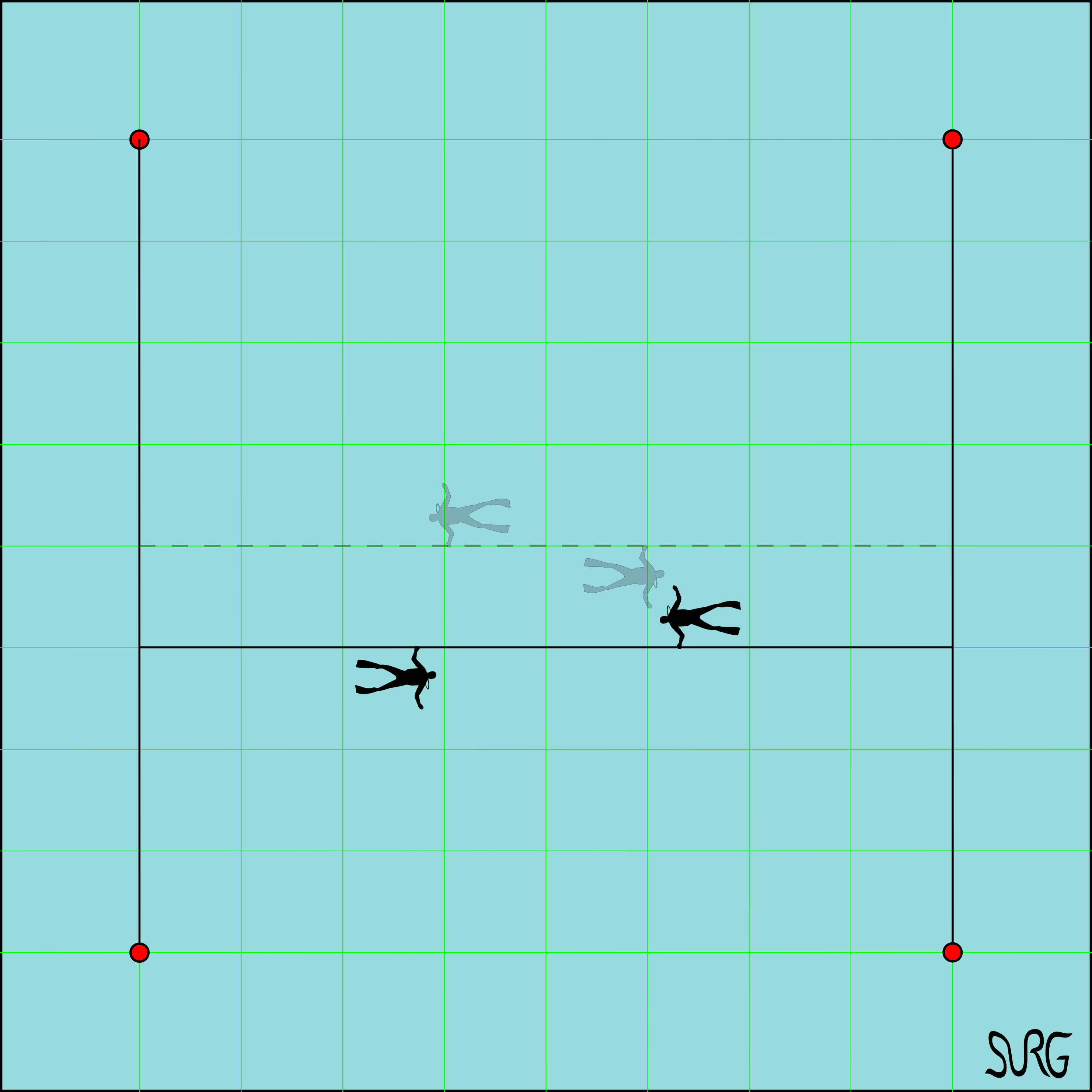
Jackstay search pattern using two fixed jackstays to define the search area and a movable jackstay to guide the divers on each leg of the search

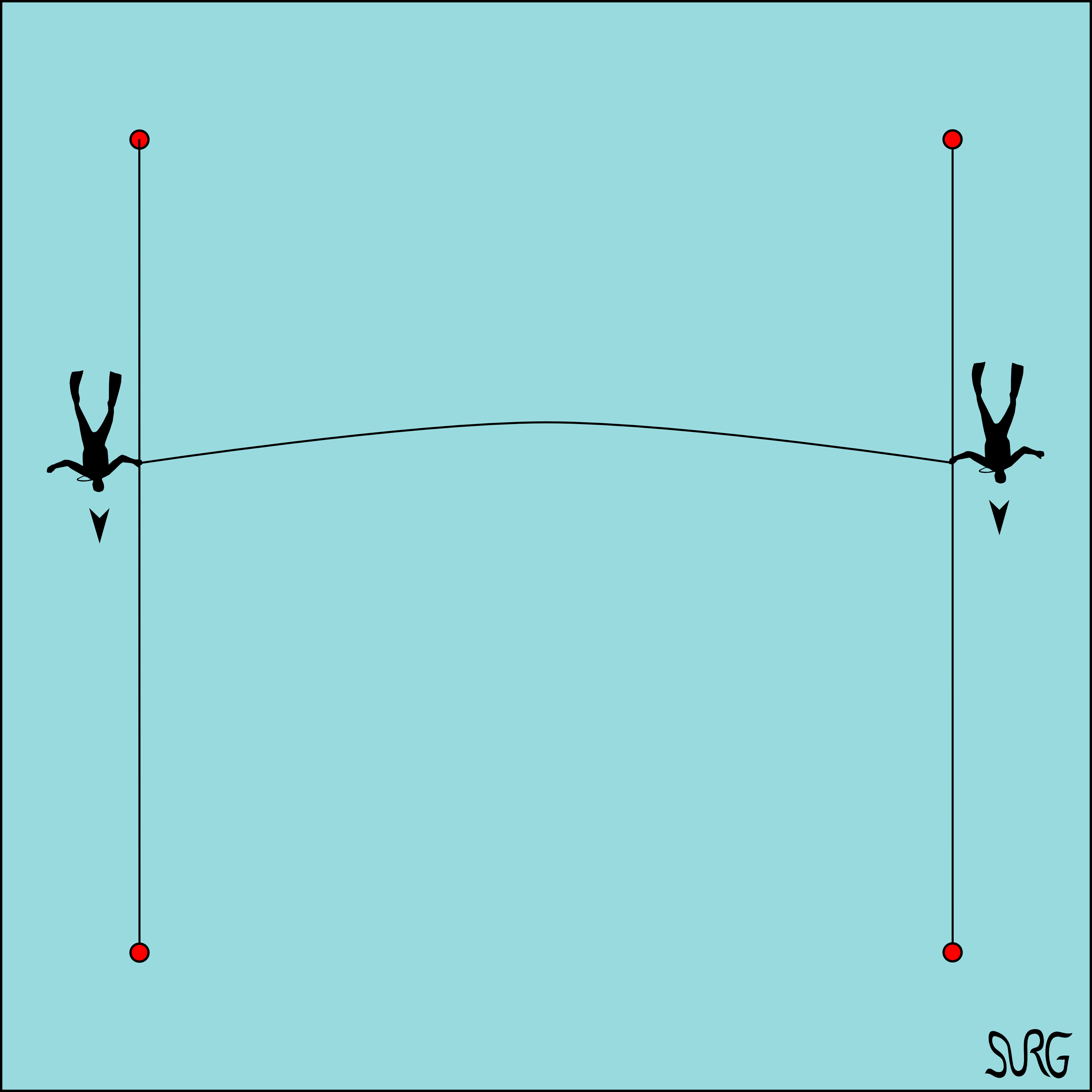
Snagline search pattern using jackstays to define the search area and guide the divers who drag a line between them to snag the target

A diving jackstay is a form of guideline laid between two points to guide the diver during a search or to and from the workplace or to support and guide equipment for transport between two points. A downline is a diving jackstay from an anchor point at or above the surface to the underwater workplace used to control descent, ascent and the transfer of tools, materials and other equipment between the surface and the workplace.

Functions:

- Guiding divers to and from the underwater workplace.
- Guiding and supporting equipment and materials to and from the underwater worksite. Where simply lowering equipment or materials to the bottom may not put the load in the right place, a jackstay may be rigged to guide the load, which is loosely linked to the jackstay by a shackle or caribiner which slides along the taut line and guides the load to the correct place. This is both more efficient and reduces the risk of dropping the load on the diver.
- Guiding divers in specific underwater search patterns. Jackstay searches use one or more lines to guide the divers in a search pattern to increase the probability of complete coverage of the search area. Jackstays may be stretched along the bottom or along the hull of a ship for this function. A moveable jackstay may be spanned between fixed jackstays to guide the divers along each sweep of the search pattern, then moved by a specified distance along the fixed jackstays by the divers in preparation for the next sweep. In a snagline search, jackstays may be used to ensure that the divers cover the correct area.

== See also ==
- Distance line, also known as guide line – Line deployed by scuba divers for navigation
- Diving equipment – Equipment used to facilitate underwater diving
- Jersey upline – A buoyed line serving as a position control during decompression
- Lifeline (diving) – A rope connecting the diver to an attendant, usually at the surface
- Safety harness – Equipment designed to protect from falling
- Shotline – Substantial weighted near-vertical line with buoy
