= Ascending and descending (diving) =

Procedures for safe ascent and descent in underwater diving

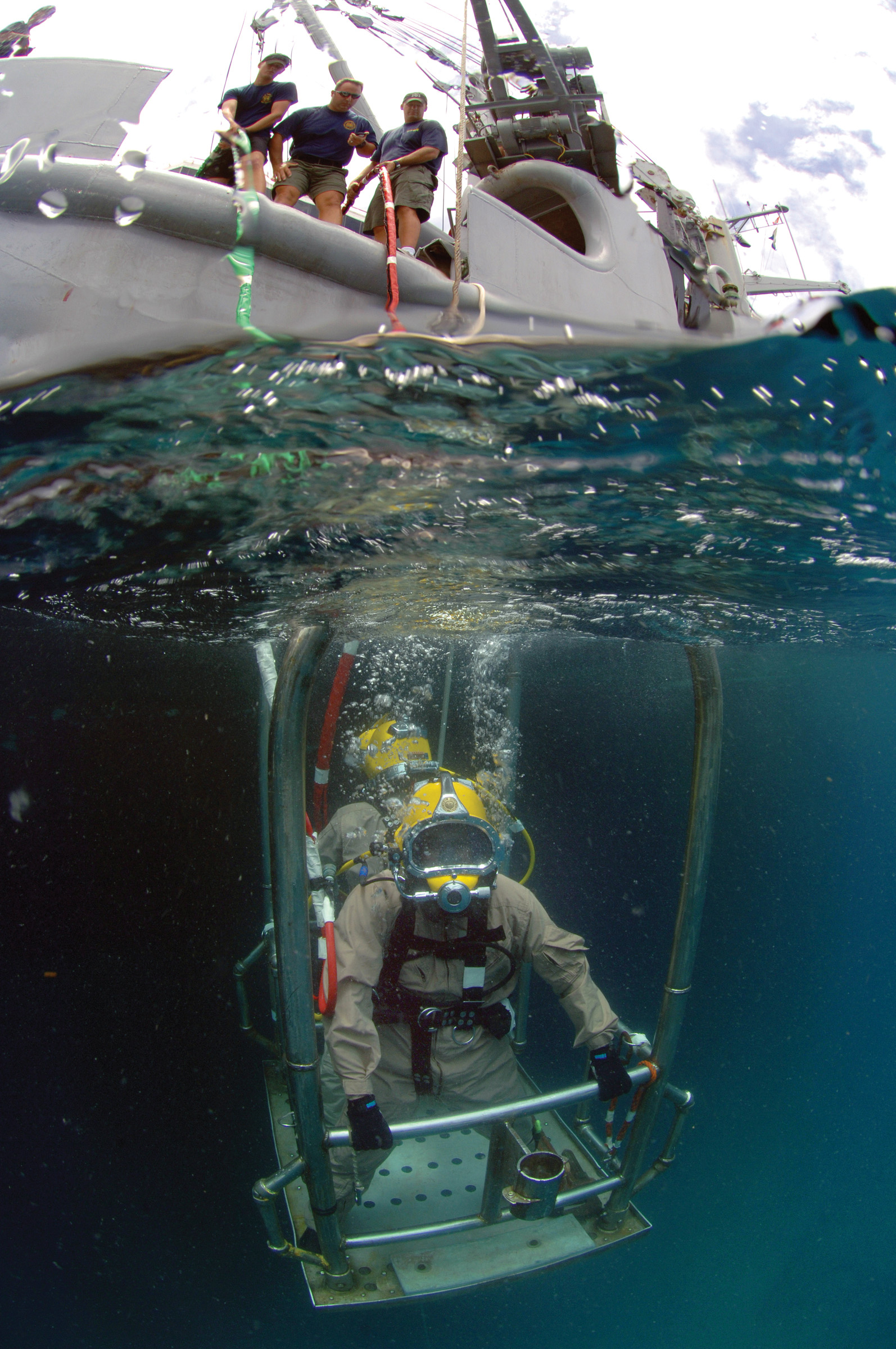
Diving stage used to control ascents and descents of surface-supplied divers

In underwater diving, ascending and descending is done using strict protocols to avoid problems caused by the changes in ambient pressure and the hazards of obstacles near the surface such as collision with vessels. Diver certification and accreditation organisations place importance on these protocols early in their diver training programmes. Ascent and descent are historically the times when divers are injured most often when failing to follow appropriate procedure.

The procedures vary depending on whether the diver is using scuba or surface supplied equipment. Scuba divers control their own descent and ascent rate, while surface supplied divers may control their own ascents and descents, or be lowered and lifted by the surface team, either by their umbilical, or on a diving stage, or in a diving bell.

Descent rates are usually limited by equalisation issues, particularly with ears and sinuses, but on helmet dives can be limited by flow rate of gas available for equalising the helmet and suit, by carbon dioxide buildup caused by inadequate exhalation, and for divers breathing heliox at great depths, by high-pressure nervous syndrome. Ascents of divers breathing at ambient pressure are normally limited by decompression risk, but also to a far lesser extent, by lung overpressure injury risk. Historically there has been considerable change in the recommended maximum ascent rate, mostly to limit risk of decompression sickness.

Freedivers are less limited by equipment, and in extreme events may use heavy ballast to accelerate descent, and an inflatable lift bag to accelerate ascent, as they do not normally stay under pressure long enough to be affected by decompression issues. Atmospheric pressure suit divers are physiologically unaffected by the external pressure. Their rates of ascent and descent are limited by equipment deployment and recovery factors.

== Scuba diving ==
=== Controlled descent ===
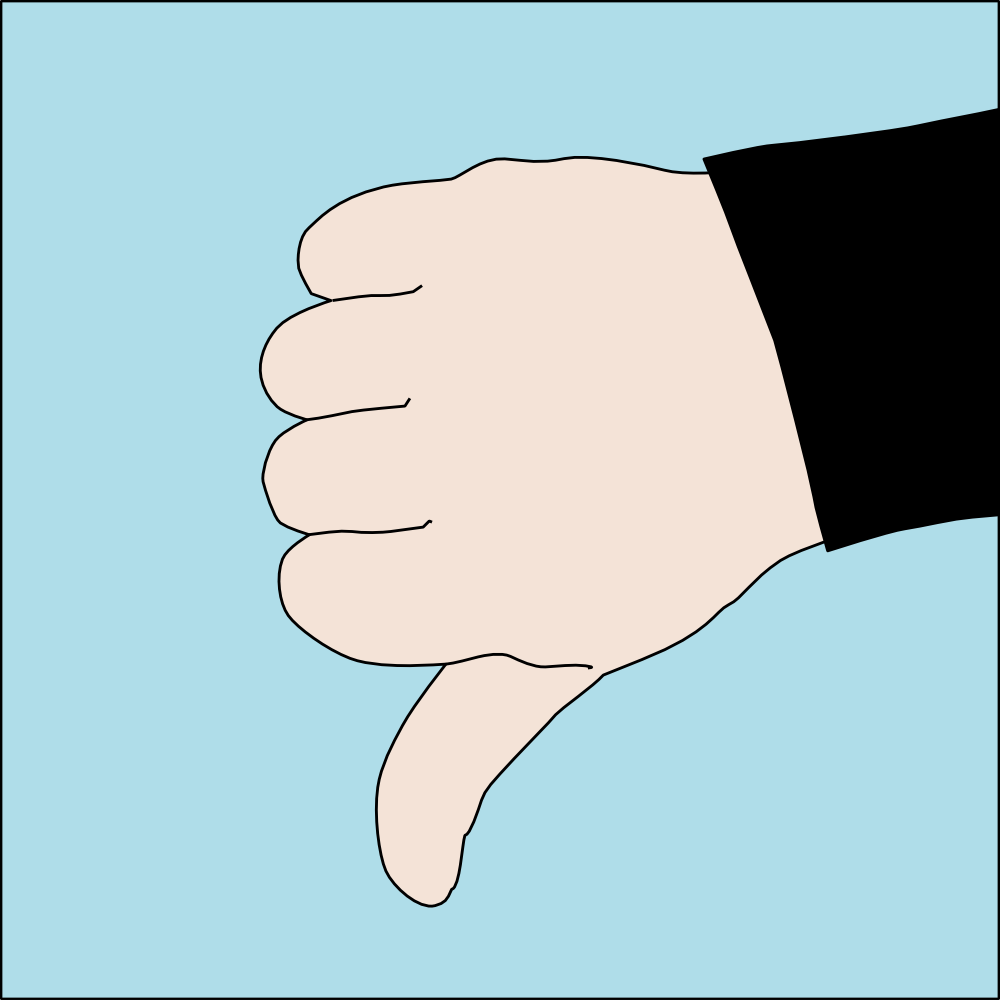
The diver hand signal for starting the descent

Descents may be made along a shot-line, along the slope of the bottom, or in open water clear of any physical or visual cues to rate of descent other than the depth gauge or dive computer carried by the diver. Scuba divers often dive in buddy pairs for safety reasons, and if following standard protocol, will descend in view of each other in case of problems. The signal to descend is the thumb down fist. The divers will start breathing from their regulators before starting the descent, and ensure that they are functioning correctly, before releasing sufficient air from their buoyancy compensators (BCDs) to start sinking. As they leave the surface, the divers will start equalising the pressure in their middle ears to prevent barotrauma, and will add air to their dry-suits, if using them, to prevent squeeze. Air may be added to the BCD as needed to control rate of descent. They may stop at a pre-arranged depth to do a final equipment check for air leaks. Equalisation will continue as needed all the way down, and depth must be monitored using a depth gauge or dive computer so that they can inflate their BCDs to neutral buoyancy in time to stop before colliding with the bottom, or overshooting the planned depth if diving a wall or steep slope. Speed of descent can be as fast as the divers can comfortably equalise, or as slow as convenient, though a longer descent reduces the useful bottom time.

=== Uncontrolled descent ===
Uncontrolled descent is usually caused by failure to control buoyancy during the descent. Consequences depend largely on the depth. In shallow water the diver will inevitably be stopped by reaching the bottom, at which point corrections can be made, and in the worst case weights can usually be dropped. There is a risk of ear or sinus squeeze if the diver is unable to equalise sufficiently. In deep water it is an emergency and may require immediate ditching of weights to stop the descent if inflation of buoyancy compensator and/or dry suit do not suffice.

=== Controlled ascent ===
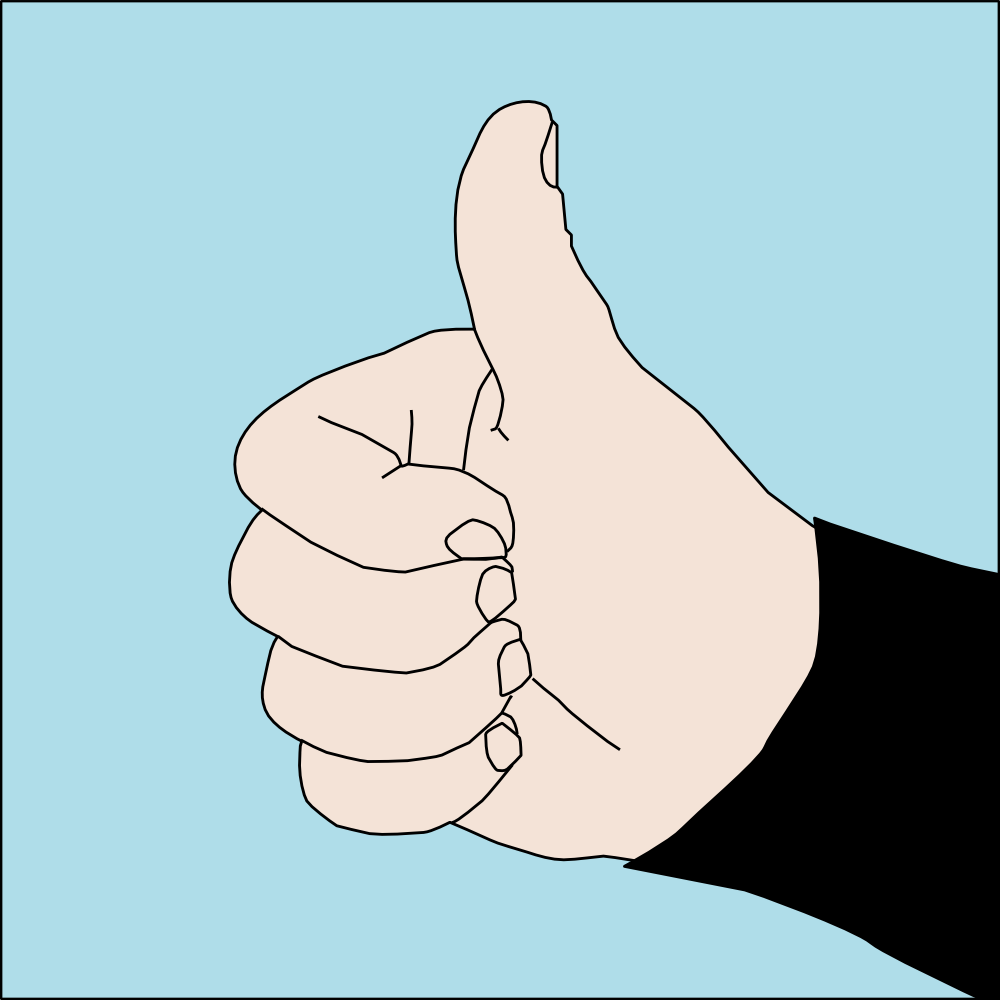
Hand signal to ascend

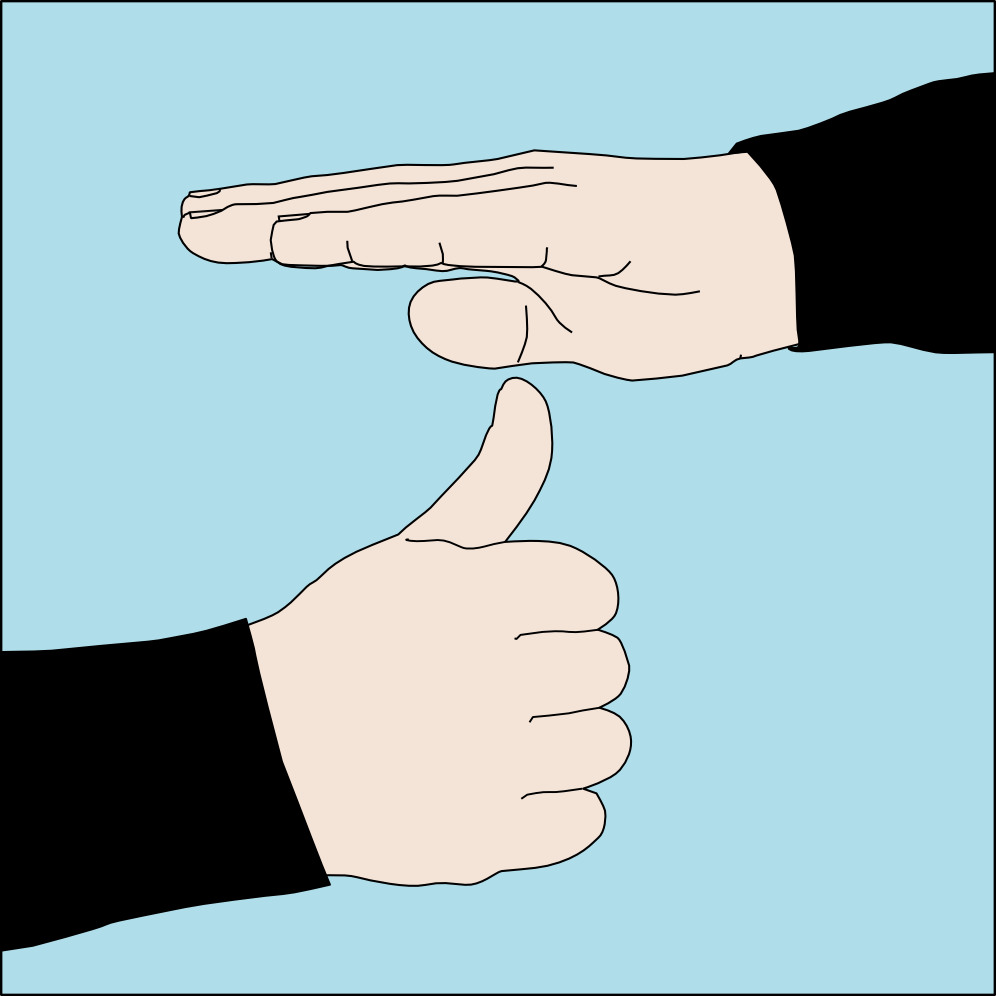
Hand signal to ascend to the next stop depth

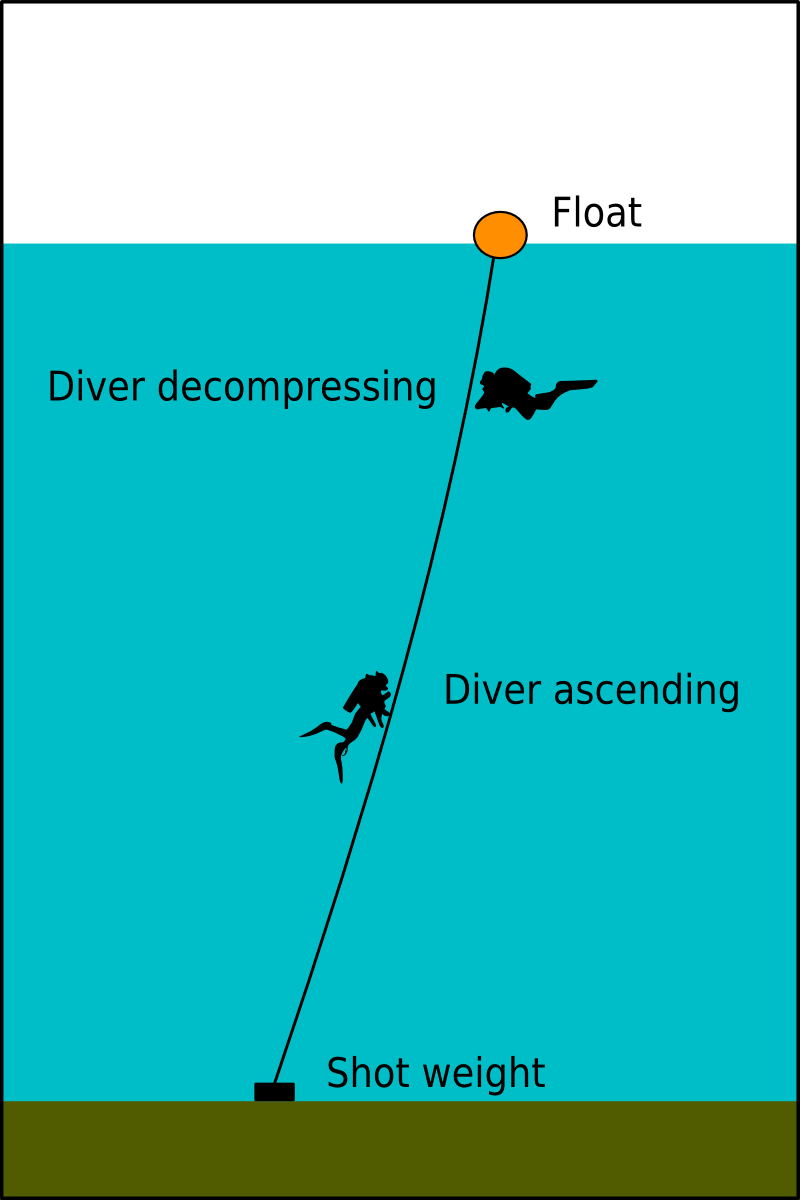
Divers ascending at shotline

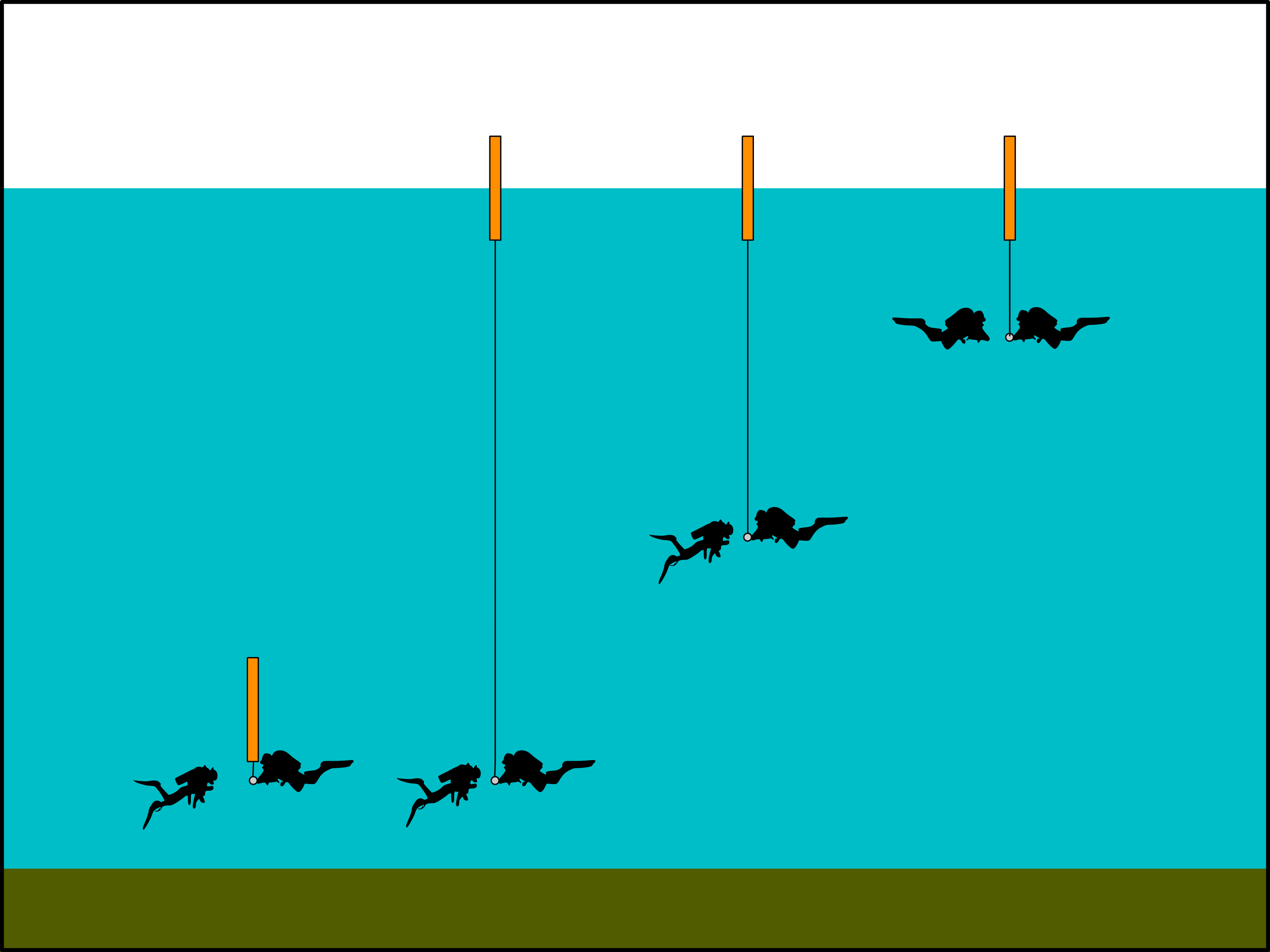
Four stages of scuba ascent with delayed surface marker buoy: Preparation, deployment, ascent, decompression stop

Three stages can be distinguished in the procedure for a controlled ascent. The beginning, where the decision and preparations are made, The initial ascent, and the decompression stage.

The beginning may be when a specified decompression or time to surface limit has been reached, breathing gas has reached a limit, the task of the dive has been completed, or the dive has been terminated for some other reason. The procedures are intended to limit risk of barotrauma of ascent and decompression sickness, while maintaining an efficient ascent profile. One of the most important criteria for a controlled ascent is control of the ascent rate, both during the periods of active ascent (pulls), and periods of staged decompression (stops).

Maintaining a steady ascent rate at less than 60 feet per minute is challenging to scuba divers without an accurate depth reference. As of 1990 recreational scuba divers were mostly unable to reliably ascend in mid-water at the recommended rate of less than 60 feet per minute. Scientific divers were faced by the same problem. Commercial divers largely avoid it by using surface supplied equipment or ascending along a jackstay or shotline to the worksite. Accurate depth measurement and ascent rate alarms provided by a dive computer make this problem more tractable.

Ascents may be made along a shot-line, by following the upward slope of the bottom, or in open water clear of any physical or visual cues to rate of ascent. Use of a vertical line as a visual cue or to physically control ascent makes management of the ascent rate considerably easier.

A commonly used procedure for ascent in open water when not ascending along a shot line or anchor cable is to use the more recently developed delayed surface marker buoy, or decompression buoy, inflated and deployed at the start of the ascent to notify any vessel in the vicinity of presence and location of the divers as well as helping to control ascent rate and stabilise depth. Deployment may be done before starting the ascent, or at any time during the ascent. It is usually easiest to deploy at the bottom, and can then aid ascent control for the full ascent, but some divers prefer to deploy at the first decompression stop or at the safety stop, which can save some ingassing time at depth. Ascending on a decompression buoy while slightly negatively buoyant makes accurate depth and ascent rate control relatively simple, by maintaining light tension on the line as it is reeled in, at the cost of carrying the equipment, a slightly longer time at depth during deployment, a few litres of gas for inflation, and the competence to deploy the DSMB safely, which is taught in advanced recreational diver training, along with precise buoyancy control and decompression procedures, which may include use of decompression gases. It is usual for a buddy pair or team to ascend at a single decompression buoy to reduce the risk of entanglement of the lines. Other team members can then use the diver with the reel as a reliable primary depth reference, and their own depth gauge or dive computer as a secondary reference.

The divers of the group are informed of the intention to ascend, using the thumb up hand signal, and if not already neutrally buoyant, will adjust their buoyancy, and hold the inflator mechanism ready to dump excess gas from the BCD as it expands during the ascent. Increased buoyancy of the BCD and dive suit due to gas expansion could cause a runaway ascent so air is vented as the divers ascend to retain approximately neutral buoyancy. At the end of the dive the BC should contain only a small amount of gas to support the unused gas in the cylinders. The divers look upwards while ascending as applicable to avoid any obstacles. A competent diver will ascend with little or no need to fin upwards, and can stop and achieve neutral buoyancy at any depth. The diver handling the buoy may choose to remain slightly negative during the ascent to keep a small amount of tension on the line as it is wound onto the reel or spool. This reduces the risk of entanglement of the line, and gives the diver warning when buoyancy is about to become positive by reduction in line tension. Ascent speed is limited to the requirement of the decompression schedule in use - (commonly kept below 10 meters per minute) so that dissolved inert gases can be eliminated safely. A dive computer may be used to help judge this speed, and if worn on the wrist can usually be monitored while winding in the line, allowing for precise and reliable depth control, and where the computer has an ascent rate indicator, also accurate control of ascent rate.

The divers suspend ascent at the depths of any required decompression stops for the appropriate stop time, remaining as close as practicable to the specified depth for the duration of the stop. Buddy pairs will usually decompress to the schedule of the diver needing the longest decompression. A safety stop of about 1–3 minutes may be made at about 3–6 metres from the water surface. This is an optional stop, but it is predicted by some decompression models to further reduce the risk of decompression sickness. After the last stop, the final ascent is done, sometimes very slowly. Before surfacing, the divers check for approaching vessels by looking upward around themselves and listening. When the divers reach the surface, they usually inflate their BCDs to establish positive buoyancy and signal the surface team or boat that they are well using hand signals.

=== Emergency ascent ===
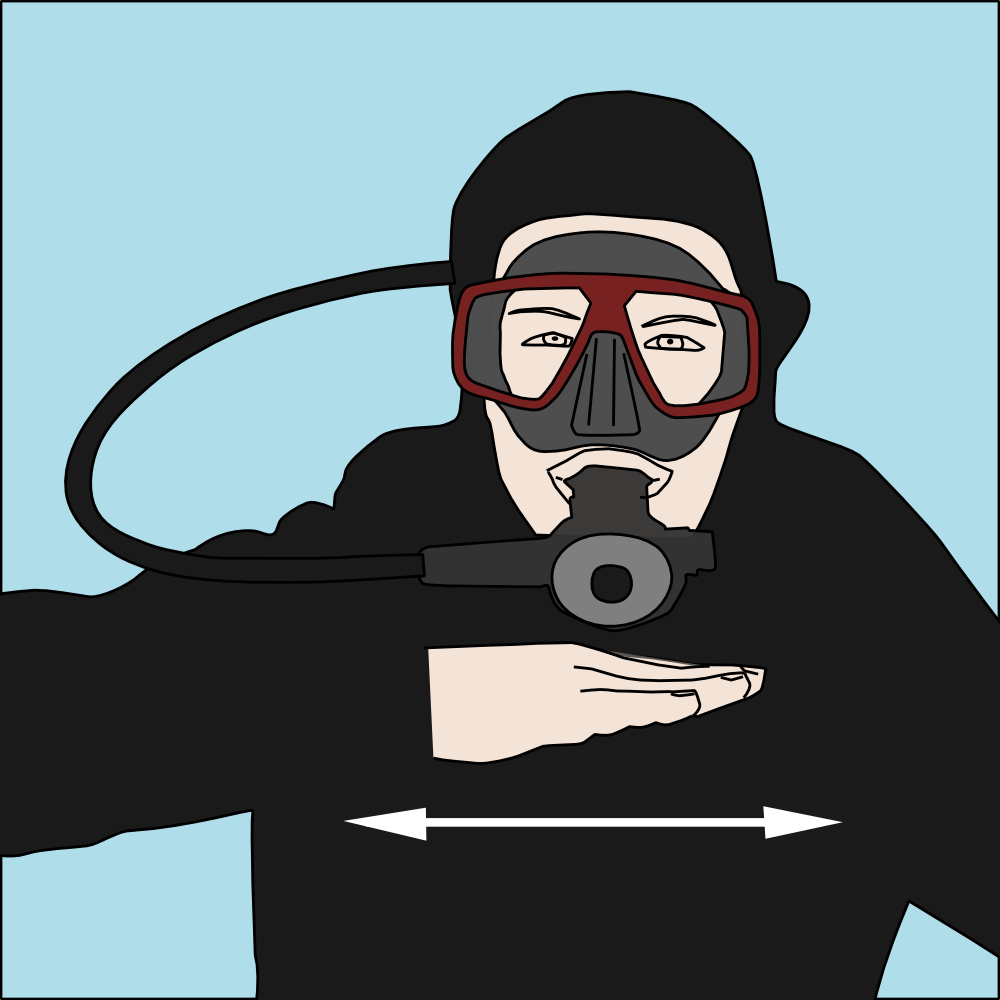
Dive signal for out-of-air emergency

In emergencies when a diver runs out of air in the cylinder in current use, and when there is no buddy around to donate air, the use of a redundant air supply (such as independent twins or a pony bottle), allows a diver to perform an ascent in a controlled manner, breathing as normal.

When no redundant air supply is available, the diver can make a controlled emergency swimming ascent. The diver starts to swim up exhaling steadily along the ascent unless trying to inhale. The mouthpiece is kept in as the cylinder still contains some air and it will become available as the ambient pressure decreases. It is important not to hold the breath, to avoid over-expansion of the air in the lungs due to pressure decrease as the depth decreases, which could cause the lung tissues to tear. The speed of ascent has to be a compromise between too slow (and running out of oxygen before reaching the surface) and too fast (risking decompression sickness). Lung barotrauma is unlikely in a healthy diver who allows the air to escape freely from the lungs. Middle ear and sinus barotrauma are also possible if ascent rate is too fast and gas cannot escape from the affected body cavity fast enough.

=== Uncontrolled ascent ===
An ascent in which the diver loses control of the ascent rate is an uncontrolled ascent. It is usually the consequence of excessive buoyancy. If the ascent rate is excessive the diver is at risk of decompression sickness and barotrauma of ascent, both of which can be fatal in extreme cases. The risk of pulmonary barotrauma in a healthy person who is medically fit to dive is very low if the airway remains open during the entire ascent, as is shown by experimental work and experience with submarine escape training, but after significant pressure exposure at depth, the risk of central nervous system decompression sickness increases with ascent rate. Uncontrolled buoyant ascent can occur in cases of suit blowup, BCD blowup, or insufficient or lost diving weights.

== Surface supplied diving ==
In surface-supplied ambient pressure diving, two very different modes are in use, and the procedures and problems associated with them are also very different. These are surface oriented dives, where the diver starts and ends the dive at atmospheric pressure, and saturation dives, where the diver remains under pressure close to that of the working depth before, during, and after the underwater dive exposure, and is compressed before a series of dives, and decompressed at the end of the series of dives.

=== Surface oriented dives (Bounce dives) ===
Surface supplied divers frequently work heavily weighted, to give them a firm footing while working on the bottom. This makes it difficult or impossible to achieve neutral buoyancy, and depth and rate of descent and ascent must be physically constrained. The standard methods are for the diver to ascend and descend on a shotline or jackstay, but, as they are connected to the surface control point by the umbilical, they can be lowered to the bottom and lifted to the surface by the umbilical. The ascent is divided into "pulls", during which the diver is pulled up at a controlled speed by the tender, and "stops", during which the depth is kept constant. For greater depths, they can be lowered and raised on a platform known as a diving stage, or in a wet bell. These are lowered from a diving support vessel or shore installation using a man-rated winch, which allows good control of depth and speed of descent and ascent, and allows these procedures to be controlled by the surface team. Divers using standard diving suits were constrained to slower descent rates, due to limitations on air supply, and the risk of suit or helmet squeeze, in extreme cases, and carbon dioxide buildup in milder cases. The US Navy maximum descent rate for this equipment was 75 feet per minute.

=== Uncontrolled ascent ===
Suit blowup was a serious hazard for divers using standard diving equipment. This occurs when the diving suit is inflated to the point at which the buoyancy lifts the diver faster than he can vent the suit to reduce buoyancy sufficiently to break the cycle of ascent induced expansion. A blowup can also be induced if air is trapped in areas which are temporarily higher than the helmet exhaust valve, such as if the feet are raised and trap air. A blowup can surface the diver at a dangerous rate, and the risk of lung overinflation injury is relatively high in comparison with normal ascent, though still low in a medically fit diver who maintains an open airway throughout the ascent. Risk of fast tissue decompression sickness is also raised depending on the pressure profile to that point, and is the highest risk. Blowup can occur for several reasons. Loss of ballast weight is another cause of buoyancy gain which may not be possible to compensate by venting. The standard diving suit can inflate during a blowup to the extent that the diver cannot bend his arms to reach the valves, and the over-pressure can burst the suit, causing a complete loss of suit buoyancy, and the diver sinking to the bottom to drown.

=== Saturation dives ===
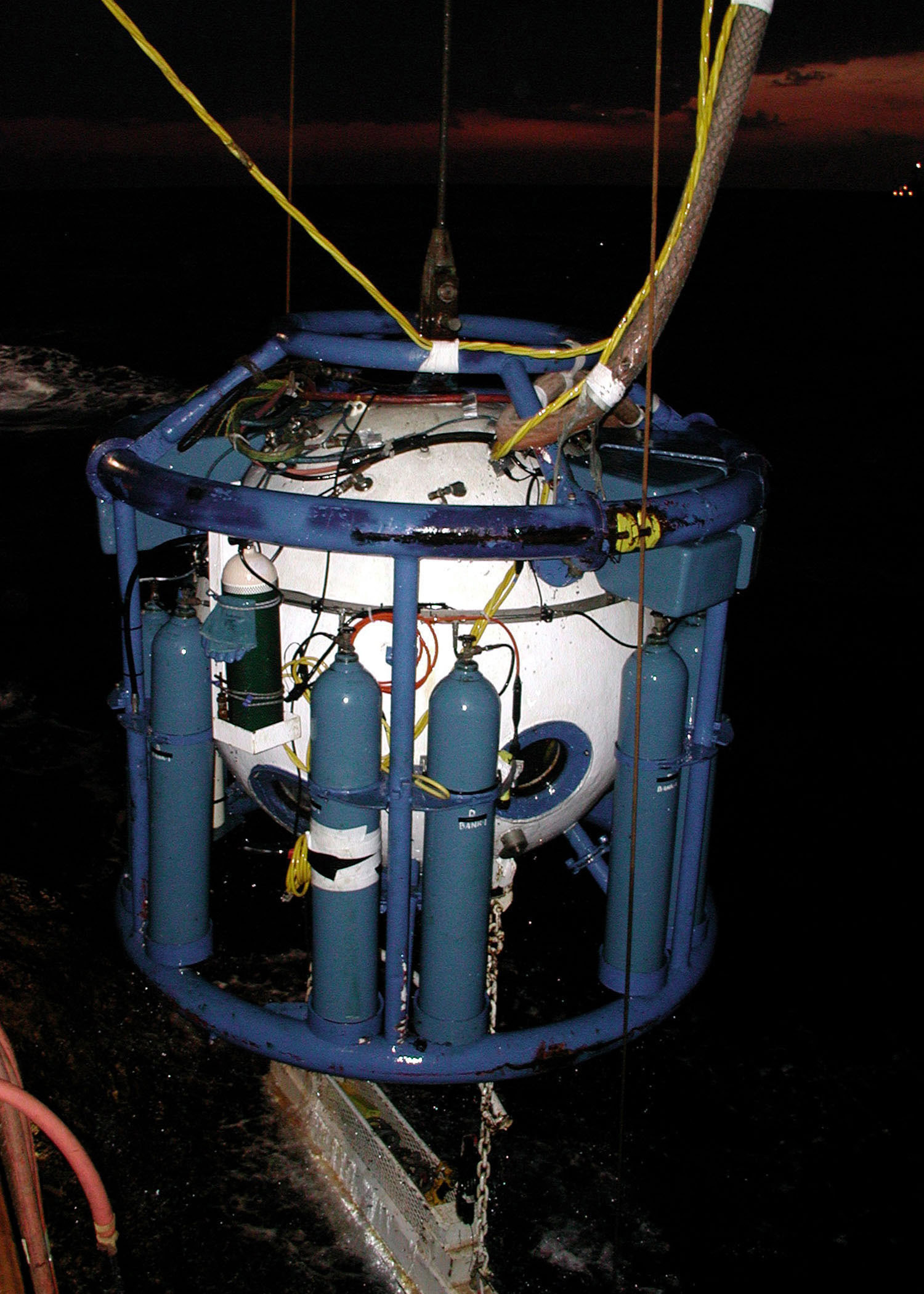
Closed diving bell used to transfer saturation divers between the accommodation chamber and the underwater workplace

Saturation divers are lowered to the working depth and raised back to the surface in closed diving bells, which are pressurized to the same pressure as the dive depth. The diver is transferred to and from the hyperbaric accommodation after adjusting the bell pressure to match the storage pressure. A certain amount of ascent and descent may occur during a saturation dive, known as upward and downward excursions. These are generally limited by the pressure variation allowable for low risk of inducing bubble formation during an upward excursion, and returning to storage pressure with low risk of bubble formation after a downwards excursion. Physical restraints to excursion depth changes are generally imposed by limiting the length of the deployed diver's umbilical, if the bottom terrain does not inherently impose such limits.

Saturation divers working out of an underwater habitat are generally saturated at the ambient pressure of the habitat interior, which is the hydrostatic pressure at the habitat airlock or moon pool surface. There are no universal standard protocols for depth limitation for this mode of diving as it is usually done for scientific purposes and therefore must be planned to suit the circumstances.

Compression and decompression of saturation divers is done in the saturation system accommodation or a part of it, or a diver may be transferred under pressure to a transportable chamber or hyperbaric rescue and escape system and decompressed elsewhere in an emergency.

== Freediving ==
Most non-competitive freediving is done with some positive buoyancy at the surface, and the diver fins downward to descend. The diver's buoyancy will decrease with depth as the air in the lungs and the wetsuit is compressed. At some stage the diver may become negatively buoyant. To ascend, the diver fins upward, generally assisted by buoyancy as the surface is approached. In competitive freediving the techniques for descent and ascent are largely specified by the rules of the specific discipline, and are quite varied, and range from unaided swimming, to pulling oneself along a shotline, to descending using a heavy weight and ascending using an inflatable lift bag.

Skandalopetra diving is a freediving technique that dates from ancient Greece, when it was used by sponge fishermen, and has been re-discovered in recent years as a freediving discipline. It consists of a variable ballast dive using a flat stone of 8 to 14 kg, with smooth, rounded corners and edges, tied to a rope, which the diver held to increase the rate of descent. During descent the diver can use the stone as a drag brake, to steer, and as ballast. The attendant monitors the depth of the diver, feels when they slow down to equalize, when they leave the stone on arrival at the bottom, and when the diver is ready to ascend. At the end of the dive, the diver stands on the stone and is pulled to the surface by the attendant.

== Ascent rates ==
=== Theoretical basis for ascent rate limitation ===
Ascent is the part of the dive in which decompression occurs. Decompression starts when ambient pressure is reduced, and starts effectively reducing tissue gas loading when an inert gas concentration gradient is developed that causes outgassing in the most loaded tissues, though this need not necessarily cause a net reduction in inert gas loading of the entire body, as diffusion continues to ingas the least saturated tissues. As ambient pressure is further reduced, a point will be reached where a net decrease in inert gas loading of the whole body is reached, and as it continues, outgassing will commence for slower and slower tissues. At some point in this scenario, some tissues may become sufficiently supersatutated to start growth of bubble nuclei, and at some later point, the bubbles in some tissues may become sufficiently large to cause the symptoms of decompression sickness. Limits for recommended ascent rate are mainly intended to avoid symptomatic bubble growth, with some safety margin. The mechanics of inert gas uptake and elimination are insufficiently understood to be modelled accurately. All physiological modelling of decompression is an approximation, but some models are more useful than others, generally after adjustment to closer match empirical data sets.

Ascent rate is chosen to limit the development of symptomatic bubbles, while inducing sufficient concentration gradient to keep the time required to eliminate the excess dissolved gas load to a logistically acceptable period. To a large extent this is an empirically based choice, and depends on a number of variables, including environmental exposure and available breathing gas supply, and statistical risk assessment. An optimal ascent rate would minimise unnecessary exposure to pressure and provide a sufficient reduction in pressure to drive outgassing, but be slow enough to protect divers from decompression sickness by sufficiently limiting bubble formation and growth. Such an ascent rate is expected to vary depending on the dive profile regarding depth exposure, tissue saturation and the breathing gas or gases used. In saturation diving, the decompression rate is controlled by the slowest tissue, and is in the order of feet or metres per hour, while in deep bounce diving it is in the order of feet or metres per minute, and should be faster at depth and slower near the surface. In recreational diving the depth and exposure time are limited, and the breathing gas does not vary much, so a maximum ascent rate may reasonably be specified as a general rule.

=== Historical variation in recommended ascent rates ===
John Scott Haldane, who produced the first experimentally based decompression tables using symptomatic decompression sickness as the criterion, advocated staged decompression, using an ascent rate of 60 fsw per minute, while Leonard Hill argued for uniform decompression – a continuous ascent at a much lower rate and without stops, which is more recently been shown to work well for decompression from saturation, which is controlled by only the slowest tissue, and at the time was also used reasonably effectively for compressed air work in tunnels and caissons, where the time at depth was relatively long. It is now known that Haldane's ascent rate produced asymptomatic bubbles, which can slow the process of gas elimination, and in some circumstances grow and cause symptoms.

Royal Navy practice before 1962 is described by Robert Davis in his book "Deep Diving and Submarine Operations", and the Royal Navy's The Diving Manual of 1943. Rate of ascent to the first stop was limited to 60 feet per minute, largely to avoid overshooting the first stop, an artifact of the method for measuring depth by pneumofatometer off the manually operated air pump, which had a relatively slow reaction time. The US Navy Bureau of Ships Diving Manual, NAVSHIPS 250-880, of 1952 specified ascent at not more than 25 feet per minute, but no rationale was provided. The French Groupe d'Etudes et de Recherches Sous-Marines de la Marine Nationale recognised that the time to the first stop is a part of decompression, mentioned in the 1955 publication "La Plongie", along with a remark that scuba divers were capable of ascending at 60 metres per minute, but that this should be considerably reduced when approaching the first stop, and that the diver should always take at least one minute to ascend the final 10 metres or run a significant risk of illness.

During the planning of the 1958 USN Air Tables, a conflict of requirements for ascent rate between the frogmen of the Underwater Demolition Team, who wanted an ascent rate of 100 ft per minute or more and the standard dress divers who insisted that that was impracticable for hauling up a diver in heavy gear. The group responsible for calculating the tables held that ascent rate was an important part of decompression, and producing two complete sets of schedules would be needed if two ascent rates were used. There was no mention of the possibility of a variable rate – a constant rate was assumed between bottom and first decompression stop. A compromise was reached to use 60 feet (18 m) per minute. The calculations indicated that deviating from the specified rate would sufficiently affect the required decompression that procedures for modified decompression for non-standard ascent rate were written into the manual.

Ascent rates used with the Bühlmann decompression algorithms originally varied with altitude to follow the relative pressure variations caused by atmospheric pressure at altitude, from 59 fpm at 1,000 ft (300 m) to 34 fpm at 15,000 ft (4,600 m), but appear to be mostly 9 to 10 metres (30 to 33 ft) per minute in 21st century dive computers using this popular algorithm.

As of 1990, ascent rates used in tables and dive computers ranged from constant ascent rates of 33, 40, and 60 fpm, from all depths, to variable depth dependent rates of 60 fpm for depths below 100 ft, 40 fpm for depths between 100 and 60 ft, and 20 fpm for depths less than 60 ft in the ORCA dive computers. Most certification agencies recommended less than 60 fpm, with no minimum specified, and the DCIEM sport diving tables specified 50 to 70 fpm.

Consensus at the 1990 American Academy of Underwater Sciences Biomechanics of Safe Ascents Workshop was to recommend a maximum ascent rate of 60 feet (18 m) per minute, in the absence of convincing evidence that a slower rate was significantly more effective in reducing decompression risk, and with good empirical evidence that this rate had a low risk of lung barotrauma with arterial gas embolism.

A study published in 2009 in the journal Aviation, Space and Environmental Medicine campared ascent rates of 30 feet per minute and 60 feet per minute in recreational divers. The group using the faster ascent rate had higher bubble grades after the dive measured ultrasonically, which supports the hypothesis that slower ascents reduce decompression stress on the body. By 2012, the US Navy, NOAA and several recreational diver training agencies had settled on a rate of 30 feet (9.1 m) per minute, though some agencies still use 60 feet (18 m) per minute.

== See also ==
- Scuba skills – Skills required to scuba-dive safely
- Surface-supplied diving skills – Underwater diving procedures
- Decompression practice – Techniques and procedures for safe decompression of divers
