= Diving safety =

Risk management of underwater diving activities

Diving safety is the aspect of underwater diving operations and activities concerned with the safety of the participants. The safety of underwater diving depends on four factors: the environment, the equipment, behaviour of the individual diver and performance of the diving team. The underwater environment can impose severe physical and psychological stress on a diver, and is mostly beyond the diver's control. Equipment is used to operate underwater for anything beyond very short periods, and the reliable function of some of the equipment is critical to even short-term survival. Other equipment allows the diver to operate in relative comfort and efficiency, or to remain healthy over the longer term. The performance of the individual diver depends on learned skills, many of which are not intuitive, and the performance of the team depends on competence, communication, preparation, attention and common goals.

There is a large range of hazards to which the diver may be exposed. These each have associated consequences and risks, which should be taken into account during dive planning. Where risks are marginally acceptable it may be possible to mitigate the consequences by setting contingency and emergency plans in place, so that harm can be minimised where reasonably practicable. The acceptable level of risk varies depending on legislation, codes of practice, company policy, and personal choice, with recreational divers having a greater freedom of choice.

In professional diving there is a diving team to support the diving operation, and their primary function is to reduce and mitigate risk to the diver. The diving supervisor for the operation is legally responsible for the safety of the diving team. A diving contractor may have a diving superintendent or a diving safety officer tasked with ensuring the organisation has, and uses, a suitable operations manual to guide their practices. In recreational diving, the dive leader may be partly responsible for diver safety to the extent that the dive briefing is reasonably accurate and does not omit any known hazards that divers in the group can reasonably be expected to be unaware of, and not to lead the group into a known area of unacceptable risk. A certified recreational diver is generally responsible for their own safety, and to a lesser, variable, and poorly defined extent, for the safety of their dive buddy.

== The concept of safety ==
Safety can be, and has been, defined in several ways. The definitions are mostly not contradictory, but are often not fully interchangeable, and it is fairly common for one to be selected to suit the circumstances.

Safety is not the absence of accidents. Safety is the presence of defences. Todd Concklin

Safety is the condition of being protected from harm, and also refers to the control of recognized hazards in order to achieve an acceptable level of risk. When one operates where it is not feasible to avoid or remove hazards completely, safety implies that defences have been set up to recover from foreseeable incidents and to mitigate their consequences to an acceptable level. The level of accepted risk may be imposed by a regulatory body, an organisation performing an activity to which risk is connected, or the individual exposed to the risk.

A distinction can be made between three types of safety:

substantive safety
objective safety
State that occurs when the real-world safety history is favorable, whether or not standards are met.
normative safety
nominal safety
State achieved when a product, design, or procedure meets applicable standards and codes of practice, regardless of the actual safety history.
perceived safety
subjective safety
Refers to the users' level of comfort and perception of risk, without consideration of standards or safety history.

Any combination of the three may coexist. Ideally all three, but the one that matters to the affected population is substantive safety.

== Basic principle ==
A diver should be able to survive any single reasonably predicable incident of significant risk to their life that may plausibly occur under the known and expected circumstances of a planned dive. When this ability is compromised, the dive should be terminated as soon as reasonably practicable, and as safely as reasonably practicable. There are many detailed rules and procedures, and a large amount of equipment dedicated to this principle. Some of these include intervention by another person or team when the potential problem cannot be adequately managed by the unaided diver. The level of acceptable risk will depend on the circumstances and in some cases, the informed choice of the diver.

The hazards to which the diver is exposed should be identified during the planning stages of a dive, and the associated risk assessed, and they may be controlled by one or more of several methods, which, in generally accepted order of decreasing priority, are: Elimination of the hazard, substitution of a lesser hazard, engineering controls which provide physical barriers from the hazard, administrative controls which provide procedural barriers, and personal protective equipment which rely on a combination of procedures and equipment where the hazard cannot be sufficiently controlled by other methods. Choice of the method depends to a large extent on whether application to a specific hazard is possible and reasonably practicable.

== Environmental factors ==
The underwater environment is alien to humans. When not actively hostile, it is unforgiving of errors, and some errors can escalate rapidly to a fatal conclusion. Many aspects of the underwater environment are static or predictable, others vary and may not be easily or reliably predictable, and must be managed as and when they occur. The reasonably predictable factors can be allowed for in the dive planning. Suitable equipment can be selected, personnel can be trained in its use and support provided to manage the foreseeable contingencies. When conditions are found to be other than predicted, plans may have to be changed. Sometimes conditions are better than expected, but other times they may be worse, and may deteriorate during the course of a dive to the extent that recovery becomes an emergency.

- Predictable and static environmental factors are conditions which should be considered in the dive plan. These include geographic factors, like depth, topography, access, tides and currents, normal temperature range and the local ecology.
- Variable environmental factors are the conditions that can change during a dive, like sea and weather conditions. Dive contingency plans should take into account the reasonably foreseeable variations based on forecasts and local knowledge. When there is no reliable local knowledge available, a wider range of variability should be considered.
- Unknown environmental factors are conditions which cannot be taken into account directly, but their reasonably foreseeable existence should be considered in risk assessment, and allowed for if there is a plausible risk.

== Equipment safety ==
Two basic classes of equipment are used by divers: Equipment necessary to do the planned dive, and equipment required to do the task for which the dive is necessary. Recreational divers may not require equipment for a task, but it is quite common for them to use a camera, and some will survey a dive site, or use a small lift bag to recover an anchor or diving shot. There are no particularly significant risks associated with tools commonly used by recreational divers. Commercial divers usually use tools of some kind while diving, and some of these tools can be very dangerous if used incorrectly, such as high-pressure water jetting, explosive bolts, oxy-arc cutting and welding, and heavy lifting equipment and rigging.

=== Scuba ===
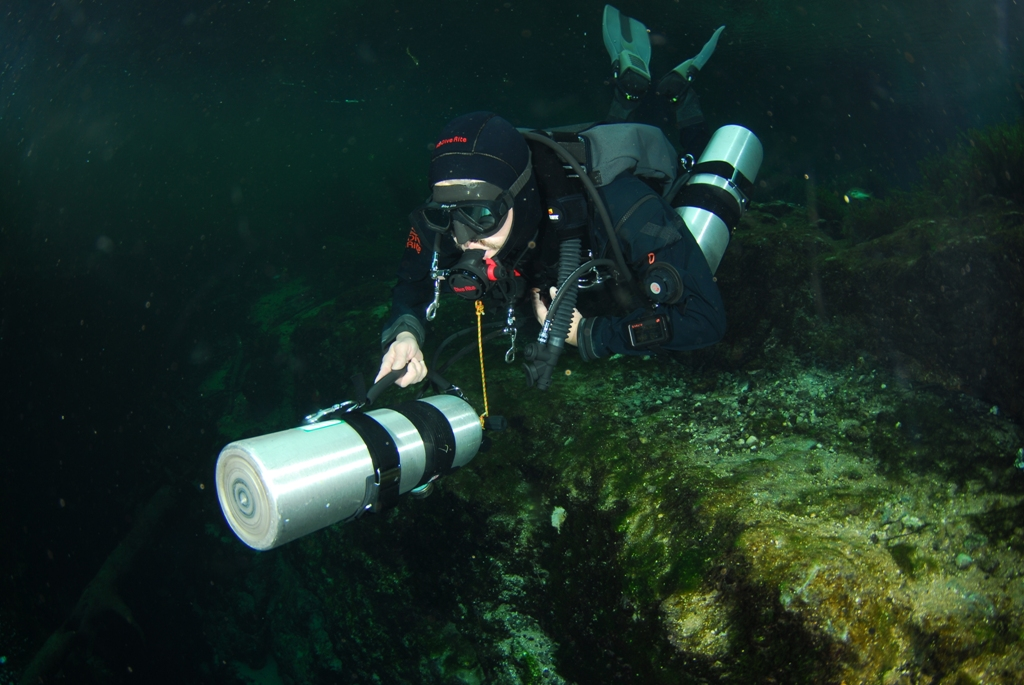
Sidemount scuba is useful in tight restrictions

Open circuit scuba is mechanically robust and reliable, but can malfunction when damaged, misused, poorly maintained, or occasionally due to unplanned circumstances. Provision of a completely independent emergency supply capable of providing sufficient breathing gas to allow the diver to surface safely from any point on the planned dive profile reduces the risk of a non-survivable out of gas incident to an extremely low level. This remains valid only as long as the emergency gas supply is within immediate reach of the diver, which is more reliably achieved by the diver carrying a bailout cylinder than by relying on a buddy or stand-by diver, who may not be where needed in an emergency.

Rebreathers have an intrinsically much higher risk of mechanical and electrochemical sensor failure than open circuit scuba because of their structural and functional complexity, and some inherent characteristics of electro-galvanic oxygen sensors, but this can be mitigated by fault tolerant design which provides redundancy of critical items and by carrying sufficient alternative breathing gas supplies for bailout including any required decompression in case of failure. Designs that minimize risk of human-machine interface errors, and adequate training in procedures that deal with this area may help reduce the fatality rate. Two thirds of fatalities were associated with high risk behaviour or a high risk dive profile.

=== Surface-supplied equipment ===
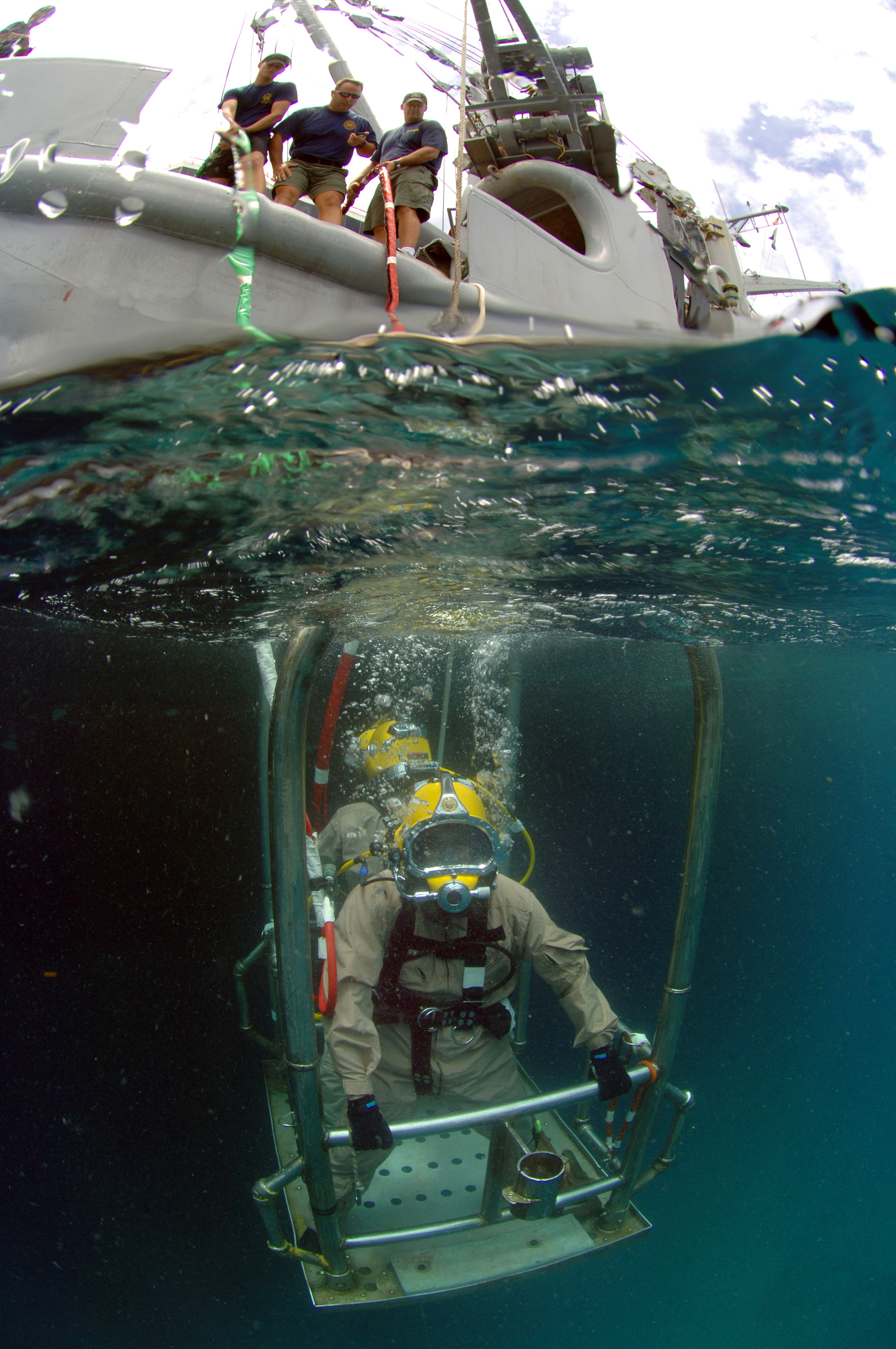
Surface-supplied divers riding a stage to the underwater workplace

The essential aspect of surface-supplied diving is that breathing gas is supplied from the surface, either from a diving compressor, high-pressure cylinders, or both. In commercial and military surface-supplied diving, a backup source of breathing gas should always be present in case the primary supply fails. The diver will normally also carry an emergency gas supply. With two alternative air sources available, the surface-supplied diver is much less likely to have an "out-of-gas" emergency than a scuba diver. Surface-supplied diving equipment usually includes voice communication capability with the surface, which improves the safety and efficiency of the working diver. Surface-supplied equipment is required for diving in harsh contaminated environments, and for most commercial diving operations by several professional codes of practice and national regulations.

=== Saturation systems ===
Design, manufacture, testing and maintenance of saturation diving systems and their components may be required to comply with national occupational safety and health regulations for inshore work and IMCA requirements or the equivalent for offshore work. Saturation systems are generally designed, manufactured, and classified to the standards of a recognised classification society like Lloyd's Register, Bureau Veritas, American Bureau of Shipping or Det Norske Veritas for quality assurance.

=== Manufacturing and performance standards ===
National and international standards have been published for the manufacture and testing of diving equipment for quality assurance and user safety. There are standards for underwater breathing apparatus, swimfins, diving masks, snorkels, buoyancy compensators, wetsuits, dry suits, depth gauges, dive computers, and other equipment.

== Human factors ==
Human factors are the physical or cognitive properties of individuals, or social behavior which is specific to humans, and influence functioning of technological systems as well as human-environment equilibria. Human error can be defined as an individual's deviation from acceptable or desirable practice which culminates in undesirable or unexpected results. Human error is inevitable and everyone makes mistakes at some time. The consequences of these errors are varied and depend on many factors. Most errors are minor and do not cause significant harm, but others can have catastrophic consequences. Examples of human error leading to accidents are available in vast numbers, as it is the direct cause of 60% to 80% of all accidents. The safety of underwater diving operations can be improved by reducing the frequency of human error and the consequences when it does occur.

In a high risk environment, as is the case in diving, human error is more likely to have catastrophic consequences. A study by William P. Morgan showed that over half of all divers in the survey had experienced panic underwater at some time during their diving career. Panic frequently leads to errors in a diver's judgment or performance, and may result in an accident. Human error and panic are considered to be the leading causes of dive accidents and fatalities.

Humans function underwater by virtue of technology, as our physiology is poorly adapted to the environment. Human factors are significant in diving because of this harsh and alien environment, and because diver life support systems and other equipment that may be required to perform specific tasks depend on technology that is designed, operated and maintained by humans, and because human factors are cited as significant contributors to diving accidents in most accident investigations

Only 4.46% of the recreational diving fatalities in a 1997 study were attributable to a single contributory cause. The remaining fatalities probably arose as a result of a progressive sequence of events involving two or more procedural errors or equipment failures, and since procedural errors are generally avoidable by a well-trained, intelligent and alert diver, working in an organised structure, and not under excessive stress, it was concluded that the low accident rate in professional scuba diving is due to this factor. The study also concluded that it would be impossible to eliminate absolutely all minor contraindications of scuba diving, as this would result in overwhelming bureaucracy and would bring all diving to a halt.

Professional diving is a means to accomplish a wide range of activities underwater in a normally inaccessible and potentially hazardous environment. While working underwater, divers are subjected to high levels of physical and psychological stress due to environmental conditions and the limitations of the life support systems, as well as the rigours of the task at hand.

Recreational, or sport divers, including technical divers, dive for entertainment, and are usually motivated by a desire to explore and witness, though there is no distinct division between the underwater activities of recreational and professional divers. The primary distinction is that legal obligations and protection are significantly different, and this is reflected in organisational structure and procedures.

Recreational diving has been rated more risky than snow skiing, but less risky than other adventure sports such as rock climbing, bungee jumping, motorcycle racing and sky diving. Improvements in training standards and equipment design and configuration, and increased awareness of the risks of diving, have not eliminated fatal incidents, which occur every year in what is generally a reasonably safe recreational activity.

Both categories of diver are usually trained and certified, but recreational diving equipment is typically limited to freediving and scuba, whereas professional divers may be trained to use a greater variety of diving systems, from scuba to surface supplied mixed gas, saturation systems and atmospheric diving suits. A recreational diver may use some ancillary equipment to enhance the diving experience, but the professional will almost always use tools to perform a specific task.

Since the goal of recreational diving is personal enjoyment, a decision to abort a dive, for whatever reason, normally only affects the diver and his companions. A working diver faced with the same decision, must disappoint a client who needs and expects the diver's services, often with significant financial consequences. Therefore, the working diver often faces greater pressure to provide the service at the cost of reduced personal safety. An understanding of the human factors associated with diving may help the diving team to strike an appropriate balance between service delivery and safety.

=== Fitness to dive ===
Fitness to dive is the medical and physical capacity of a diver to function safely in the underwater environment using underwater diving equipment and procedures. Psychological factors can also affect fitness to dive, particularly where they affect response to emergencies, or risk taking behavior. Some conditions affect fitness to function safely and effectively underwater in unpredictable ways, and may not be noticed until they show up under stress and precipitate an emergency. Other conditions do not necessarily prohibit the person from diving, but limit their ability to manage in difficult circumstances, and a realistic assessment of where the diver's personal limits lie can help prevent an emergency from developing. In professional diving, the diving medical examination is used to identify divers who are at risk in circumstances which are acceptable in a working environment. Recreational divers must take more personal responsibility for self-assessment before each dive. To some extent greater competence can mitigate a lower level of fitness, as the diver can correct mishaps more quickly and with less effort.

=== Situational awareness ===
Situational awareness is the perception of environmental elements and events with respect to time or space, the comprehension of their meaning, and the projection of their future status. It has been recognized as a critical, yet often elusive, foundation for successful decision-making across a broad range of situations. Lacking or inadequate situation awareness has been identified as one of the primary factors in accidents attributed to human error. The formal definition of situational awareness breaks it down into three components: perception of the elements in the environment, comprehension of the situation, and projection of future status. Situational awareness is recognised as necessary for diving safety, as a member of the dive team who is not aware of changing circumstances may fail to react appropriately in time to avoid serious difficulties. Situation awareness is limited by sensory input and available attention, by the diver's knowledge and experience, and by their ability to recognise, interpret and analyse the available information effectively. Attention is a limited resource, and may be reduced by distraction and task loading. Comprehension of the situation and projection of future status depend heavily on relevant knowledge, understanding, and experience in similar environments and situations. Team situation awareness may be less limited by these factors, as there can be a wider knowledge and experience base, but it is limited by the effectiveness of communication within the team.

=== Diver performance ===
Safety of underwater diving operations can be improved by reducing the frequency of human error and the consequences when it does occur.

- Inadequate learning or practice of critical safety skills may result in the inability to deal with minor incidents, which consequently may develop into major incidents.
- Overconfidence can result in diving in conditions beyond the diver's competence, with high risk of accident due to inability to deal with known environmental hazards.
- Inadequate strength or fitness for the conditions can result in inability to compensate for difficult conditions even though the diver may be well versed at the required skills, and could lead to over-exertion, overtiredness, stress injuries or exhaustion, all of which can adversely affect the dive's ability to handle an emergency.
- Peer pressure can cause a diver to dive in conditions where they may be unable to deal with reasonably predictable incidents.
- Plan continuation bias and the sunk cost fallacy can induce the team to take greater risks when circumstances deteriorate.
- Normalisation of deviance and practical drift can slowly erode adherence to best practice.
- Diving with an incompetent buddy can result in injury or death while attempting to deal with a problem caused by the buddy.
- Overweighting can cause difficulty in neutralising and controlling buoyancy, and this can lead to uncontrolled descent, inability to establish neutral buoyancy, inefficient swimming, high gas consumption, poor trim, kicking up silt, difficulty in ascent and inability to control depth accurately for decompression.
- Underweighting can cause difficulty in neutralising and controlling buoyancy, and consequent inability to achieve neutral buoyancy, particularly at decompression stops.
- Diving under the influence of drugs or alcohol, or with a hangover may result in inappropriate or delayed response to contingencies, reduced ability to deal timeously with problems, leading to greater risk of developing into an accident, increased risk of hypothermia and increased risk of decompression sickness.
- Use of inappropriate equipment and/or configuration can lead to a whole range of complications, depending on the details.
- High task loading due to a combination of these factors can result in a dive that goes well enough until something goes wrong, and the diver's residual capacity is not enough to cope with the changed circumstances. This can be followed by a cascade of failures, as each problem loads the diver more and triggers the next. In such cases the diver is lucky to survive, even with the assistance of a buddy or team, and there is a significant risk of others becoming part of the accident.

=== Diving team performance ===
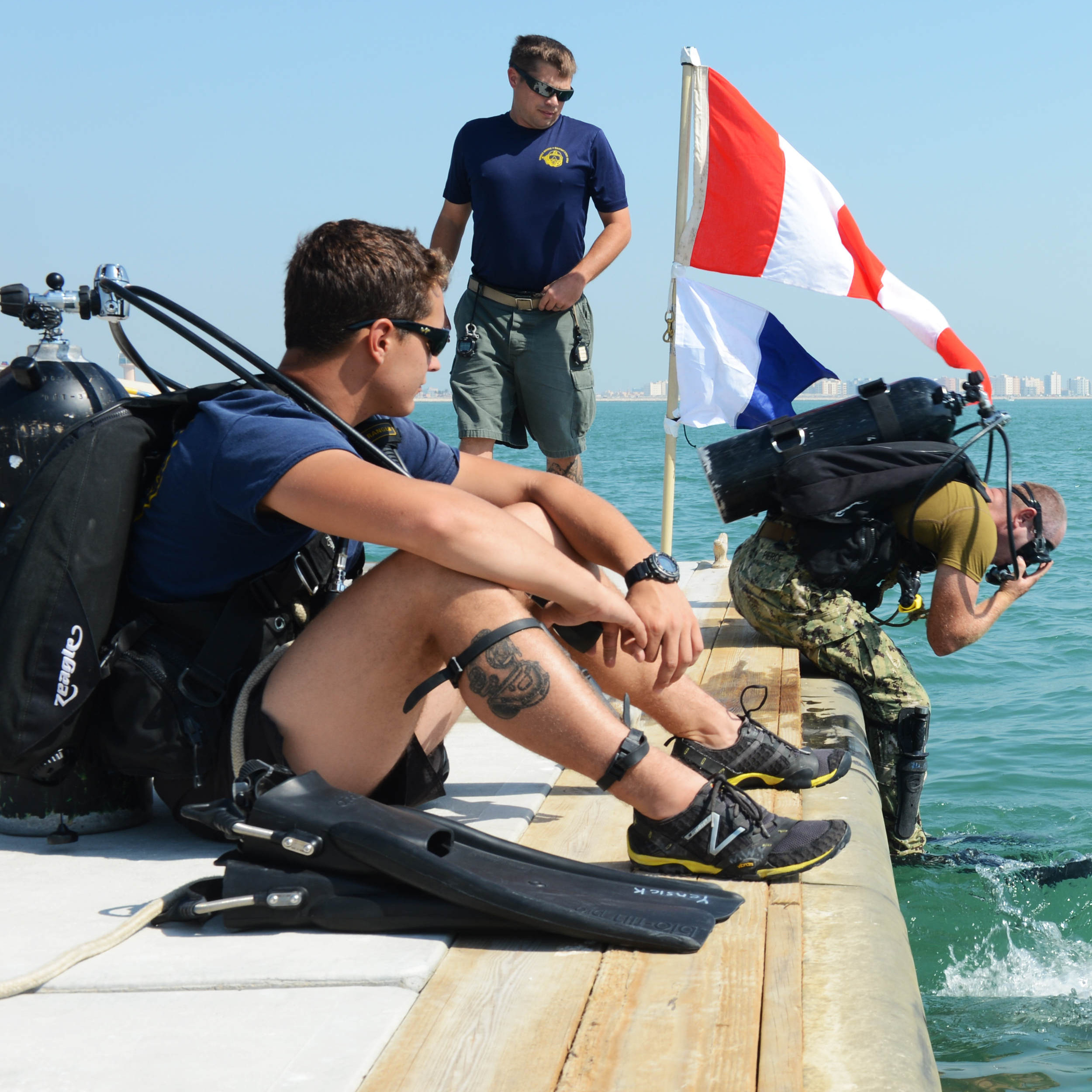
Minimal professional diving team, with standby diver, supervisor and working diver entering the water

A diving team can vary from a recreational buddy pair to a professional saturation diving team working 24 hours per day with dive and habitat support personnel on a dynamically positioned vessel. The primary purpose of a professional diving team is to improve safety for the working diver by providing backup and support, and to manage the surface equipment required for the operation. A buddy pair is a team intended to improve the safety of recreational divers, and in some circumstances succeeds in this aim, depending on the skills, situational awareness and compliance with procedures of both of the divers. Technical diving teams can vary between the recreational buddy pair at its worst to expedition teams with structure, competence and planning similar to professional teams. For buddy diving to be an effective means of improving safety, the buddy pairs should be set long enough before the dive to allow adequate familiarisation with each other's equipment, signals and procedures, where they differ, and discuss the dive plan, and kit-up should occur in close enough proximity for both divers to actually monitor the progress and details of pre-dive checks, and where necessary, to assist directly with fitting equipment.

For many applications, the minimum personnel requirement for a professional diving operation is a working diver, to do the job, a diver's tender to assist the diver and manage the umbilical or airline, a stand-by diver, competent and ready to go to the assistance of the working diver, and a supervisor, to co-ordinate the team, ensure that the plan is acceptably safe in terms of the organisational policies coded of practice and applicable legislation, ensure that the operation follows the plan as far as possible, and to manage any contingencies or emergencies that may come up during the operation. The primary responsibility of the supervisor of a professional diving team is the health and safety of the diving team. The minimum personnel requirement for a recreational dive in most places, is the diver. There are a few countries where further support is obligatory, generally a requirement to dive with a buddy, but in most places a recreational diver is responsible for their own safety and is legally free to dive without any support personnel. Recreational service providers may impose their own terms and conditions on customers, but this is generally a contractual option.

=== Balance between safety and efficiency ===
As both time and physical and financial resources are limited, there is a trade-off between safety and efficiency. If taken to extremes, concerns with safety could prevent all diving. This trade-off is acknowledged in occupational health and safety legislation, where precautions are required to be reasonably practicable, with reference to cost, benefit, available technology and other factors.

=== Diving beyond one's training and experience ===
Recreational divers are often cautioned not to dive beyond the limits of their training and experience, as this increases the risk to the diver, and possibly also to other members of the dive team. Superficially this may seem logical, but it neglects to consider that formal training is focused on learning specific skills and assessment is against a minimum acceptable level of competence in those skills. These skills are intended to allow the diver to manage a more general range of conditions implied by the certification standard, and greater competence in the new skills is achieved by exercising those skills under a wider set of conditions than those encountered during training, which are of necessity, limited by circumstances. In reality, the range of diving that is considered within the limits of their training is generally defined in the training standard for each level of certification. The additional condition of being within the limits of their experience is not always specified in the same way. Some agencies will specify that the diver is certified to dive independently in conditions similar to those in which they were trained, but they do not specify how the similarity can be assessed.

There is also the matter of how and where the skills were originally developed and honed to become the standard practice taught to the learner in formal training programmes. These skills did not exist before the equipment was developed which makes them useful, so the pioneers of each mode of diving had to develop them from what was previously available, sometimes while using unfamiliar equipment, often by trial and error. Exploration of a place where no-one has been before, or where no-one has reported on the conditions there, is explicitly beyond the limits of a divers experience, but it is done routinely by divers who explore new dive sites. Most of these divers do not experience problems on most of their exploratory dives, and at the end of the dive have extended their experience. Those organisations which train divers at the higher levels of certification are more likely to caution divers to expand their experience gradually, making as few changes at a time as reasonably practicable, and ensuring that they remain competent at all relevant skills within the extended range as it is expanded.

=== Training and safety standards ===
There is a large variability between certification standards, and major philosophical differences regarding the minimum level of acceptable competence. Training in the minimum required skills specified for the certification, splitting certification into multiple courses for maximum diver convenience and agency profit, is common in mainstream recreational diver training, where the diver is responsible for their own safety and the choices they may make, and the agency is protected by legal waivers, and where entry-level training typically can be done over about three or four days, with four open-water dives worth of experience, and on-line self-study and automated assessment of the theoretical knowledge component. Fitness to dive is self assessed using a questionnaire. This has been shown to be an effective business strategy.

Ensuring during the entry level course that the diver is adequately skilled to deal with the range of conditions and equipment likely to be encountered at work is typical of professional diver training where training standards are set out by legislation for workplace health and safety, where entry-level training may be full time over a month, with several hours of confined water skills training and practice, a substantial classroom based theory and knowledge section, and about 30 open water dives, with practice and assessment of all critical skills and compulsory medical fitness assessment by a registered diving medical practitioner.

A few recreational/technical certification agencies provide entry-level training to intermediate levels.

== Hazards ==
Divers operate in an environment for which the human body is not well suited. They face special physical and health risks when they go underwater or use high pressure breathing gas. The consequences of diving incidents range from merely annoying to rapidly fatal, and the result often depends on the equipment, skill, response and fitness of the diver and diving team. The hazards include the aquatic environment, the use of breathing equipment in an underwater environment, exposure to a pressurised environment and pressure changes, particularly pressure changes during descent and ascent, and breathing gases at high ambient pressure. Diving equipment other than breathing apparatus is usually reliable, but has been known to fail, and loss of buoyancy control or thermal protection can be a major burden which may lead to more serious problems. There are also hazards of the specific diving environment, and hazards related to access to and egress from the water, which vary from place to place, and may also vary with time. Hazards inherent in the diver include pre-existing physiological and psychological conditions and the personal behaviour and competence of the individual. For those pursuing other activities while diving, there are additional hazards of task loading, of the dive task and of special equipment associated with the task.

Professional divers may be exposed to a wider range of hazards, some of which are inherent in the equipment used to reduce the risk of other hazards. Saturation diving is intended to reduce a relatively high risk of decompression sickness, but introduces other health and safety hazards of living at a high ambient pressure for extended periods, and transfer between pressurised spaces. Failure of a saturation system can be catastrophic and fatal to the occupants and bystanders. Such failures are seldom engineering failures, they are more often ergonomic design and operation failures, and usually systems are corrected after analysis of such failures.

Occupational hazard types can also be classified as biological, chemical, environmental, ergonomic, physical, and psychological, safety, and work organization hazards.

A particular range of hazards may be associated with a specific mode of diving:

=== Freediving ===
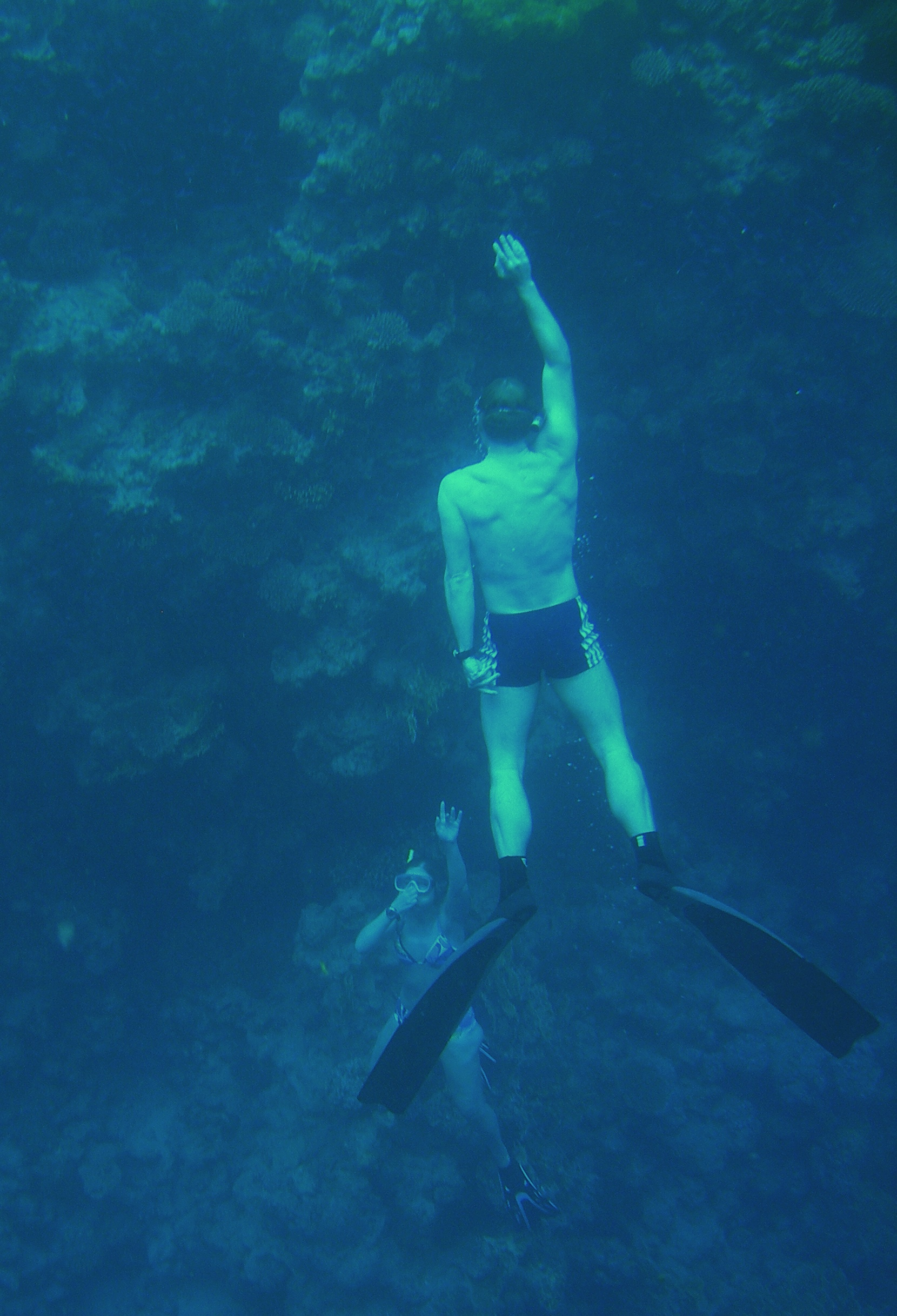
freediving in the Red Sea

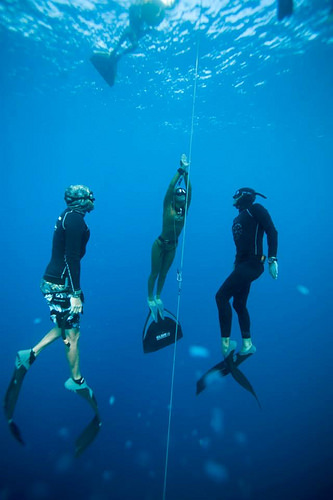
Competition freediving with safety divers

Freediving, or breath-hold diving, is the original mode of diving, and was used for centuries in spite of limitations as it was the only option available. It is simple and inexpensive, but severely limited in the time available to do useful work at depth. The risk of drowning is relatively high, as the diver is limited to the oxygen supplied by a single breath, and the risk of hypoxic blackout underwater, followed by drowning, is significant.

Hypoxic blackout during freediving is a loss of consciousness caused by cerebral hypoxia towards the end of a breath-hold dive, when the swimmer does not necessarily experience an urgent need to breathe and has no other obvious medical condition that might have caused it. It can be provoked by hyperventilating just before a dive, or as a consequence of the pressure reduction on ascent, or a combination of these. Victims are often established practitioners of breath-hold diving, are fit, strong swimmers and have not experienced problems before.

Divers and swimmers who blackout or grey out underwater during a dive will usually drown unless rescued and resuscitated within a short time. Freediving blackout has a high fatality rate but is generally avoidable. The risk cannot be quantified, but is clearly increased by any level of hyperventilation.

Freediving blackout can occur on any dive profile: at constant depth, on an ascent from depth, or at the surface following ascent from depth and may be described by a number of terms depending on the dive profile and depth at which consciousness is lost. Blackout during a shallow dive differs from blackout during ascent from a deep dive in that deep water blackout is precipitated by depressurisation on ascent from depth while shallow water blackout is a consequence of hypocapnia following hyperventilation.

Trained freedivers are well aware of this and the competition rules require competitions to be held under strict supervision and with competent first-aiders on standby. However this does not eliminate the risk of blackout. Freedivers are recommended to only dive with a 'buddy' who accompanies them, observing from in the water at the surface, and is ready and able to dive to the rescue if the diver loses consciousness during the ascent. This recommendation has an obvious point of failure when the visibility does not allow the buddy to observe the diver throughout the dive.

A rare form of decompression sickness of the central nervous system called taravana can occur in freedivers who make frequent deep dives with short surface intervals.

=== Scuba diving ===
Diving using self-contained underwater breathing apparatus was developed after surface supplied diving, and was intended as a method of improving the mobility and horizontal range of the diver who is not restricted by a physical connection to a surface gas supply. The diver has a larger gas supply than the freediver, and this allows a greatly extended underwater endurance, and lower risk of drowning, but at the cost of higher risk from decompression sickness, lung over-pressure barotrauma, nitrogen narcosis, oxygen toxicity and hypothermia, all of which must be limited by procedural and engineering controls, and personal protective equipment. For acceptable safety the diver must be able to survive any reasonably foreseeable single point of failure. For scuba equipment this implies that the failure of any single item of equipment should not put the diver out of reach of a breathing gas supply.

==== Open circuit ====
In the case of a single cylinder scuba set with a single first stage, and a single second stage, each of these items has a low but non-zero probability of failure. The components work in series - if any one of them fails, the system fails. It is equivalent to a single chain in which if any link fails, the chain breaks. When the dive is very shallow, the diver can safely escape to the surface, and when there is another diver right there with spare gas at the time of failure, they can share gas. At other times, a failure of a single item can kill the diver.

==== Closed circuit ====
Open circuit scuba has a small number of fairly rugged and reliable components, each with a small number of failure modes and a low probability of failure. Most of these components remain present in closed circuit scuba, but there are also a number of additional items which could fail. Therefore, the rebreather architecture is inherently more likely to fail, and it is necessary to provide redundancy of critical components to provide reliability even approaching that of open circuit scuba. It is also more important to provide full redundancy of breathing gas supply as some rebreather failure modes do not allow safe ascent. Bailout to open circuit is the simplest and most robust option, but for dives where a long return under an overhead, or long decompression are necessary, open circuit can be impractically bulky. There is a point at which closed circuit bailout becomes a more manageable option, and the requirement for ability to return safely from any point on the planned dive profile makes it necessary for the breathing loop and gas supplies to be fully independent, though the ability to make use of the primary gas supply in the bailout rebreather can considerably extend the range for a small added complexity, using highly reliable components, but adding to the task loading of the diver.

A hazard specific to closed circuit rebreathers is failure of the oxygen partial pressure control system. The breathing gas mixture in a diving rebreather loop is usually measured using electro-galvanic oxygen sensors, and the output of the cells is used by either the diver or an electronic control system to control addition of oxygen to increase partial pressure when it is below the chosen lower set-point, or to flush with diluent gas when it is above the upper set-point. When the partial pressure is between the upper and lower set-points, it is suitable for breathing at that depth and is left until it changes as a result of consumption by the diver, or a change in ambient pressure as a result of a depth change.

Accuracy and reliability of measurement is important in this application for two basic reasons. Firstly, if the oxygen content is too low, the diver will lose consciousness due to hypoxia and probably die, or if the oxygen content is too high, the risk of central nervous system oxygen toxicity causing convulsions and loss of consciousness, with a high risk of drowning becomes unacceptable. Secondly, decompression obligations cannot be accurately or reliably calculated if the breathing gas composition is not known. Pre-dive calibration of the cells can only check response to partial pressures up to 100% at atmospheric pressure, or 1 bar. As the set points are commonly in the range of 1.2 to 1.6 bar, special hyperbaric calibration equipment would be required to reliably test the response at the set-points. This equipment is available, but is expensive and not in common use, and requires the cells to be removed from the rebreather and installed in the test unit. To compensate for the possibility of a cell failure during a dive, three cells are generally fitted, on the principle that failure of one cell at a time is most likely, and that if two cells indicate the same P_{O_{2}}, they are more likely to be correct than the single cell with a different reading. Voting logic allows the control system to control the circuit for the rest of the dive according to the two cells assumed to be correct. This is not entirely reliable, as it is possible for two cells to fail on the same dive.

=== Surface oriented surface supplied diving ===
Surface-supplied diving is diving using equipment supplied with breathing gas using a diver's umbilical from the surface, either from the shore or from a diving support vessel, sometimes indirectly via a diving bell. Surface oriented diving means that the dive starts and ends at surface pressure, which may involve staged decompression stops, gas switches, or surface decompression.

The copper helmeted, free-flow, standard diving dress is the version which made commercial diving a viable occupation, and although still used in some regions, this heavy equipment has been superseded by lighter free-flow helmets, and to a large extent, lightweight demand helmets, band masks and full-face diving masks. Breathing gases used include air, heliox, nitrox, oxygen and trimix. Gases with raised oxygen fraction are used to reduce decompression obligation and accelerate decompression, and gases containing helium are used to reduce nitrogen narcosis. Both applications reduce the risk to the diver when applicable.

The primary advantages of conventional surface-supplied diving over scuba are lower risk of drowning and considerably larger breathing gas supply than scuba, allowing longer working periods and safer decompression.

Surface-supplied diving systems also improve safety by virtually eliminating the risk of a lost diver, as the diver is physically connected to the surface control point by the breathing gas supply hose, and other components of the umbilical cable system. They also significantly reduce the risk of running out of breathing gas during the dive, and allow multiple redundancy of gas supply, with main and secondary surface supply, and a scuba bailout emergency gas system. Use of helmets and full-face masks help protect the diver's airway in case of loss of consciousness. These can be considered engineering controls of the hazards. Surface supplied systems routinely include voice communication between diver and supervisor, making it relatively easy to monitor the condition of the diver from the surface.

=== Saturation diving ===
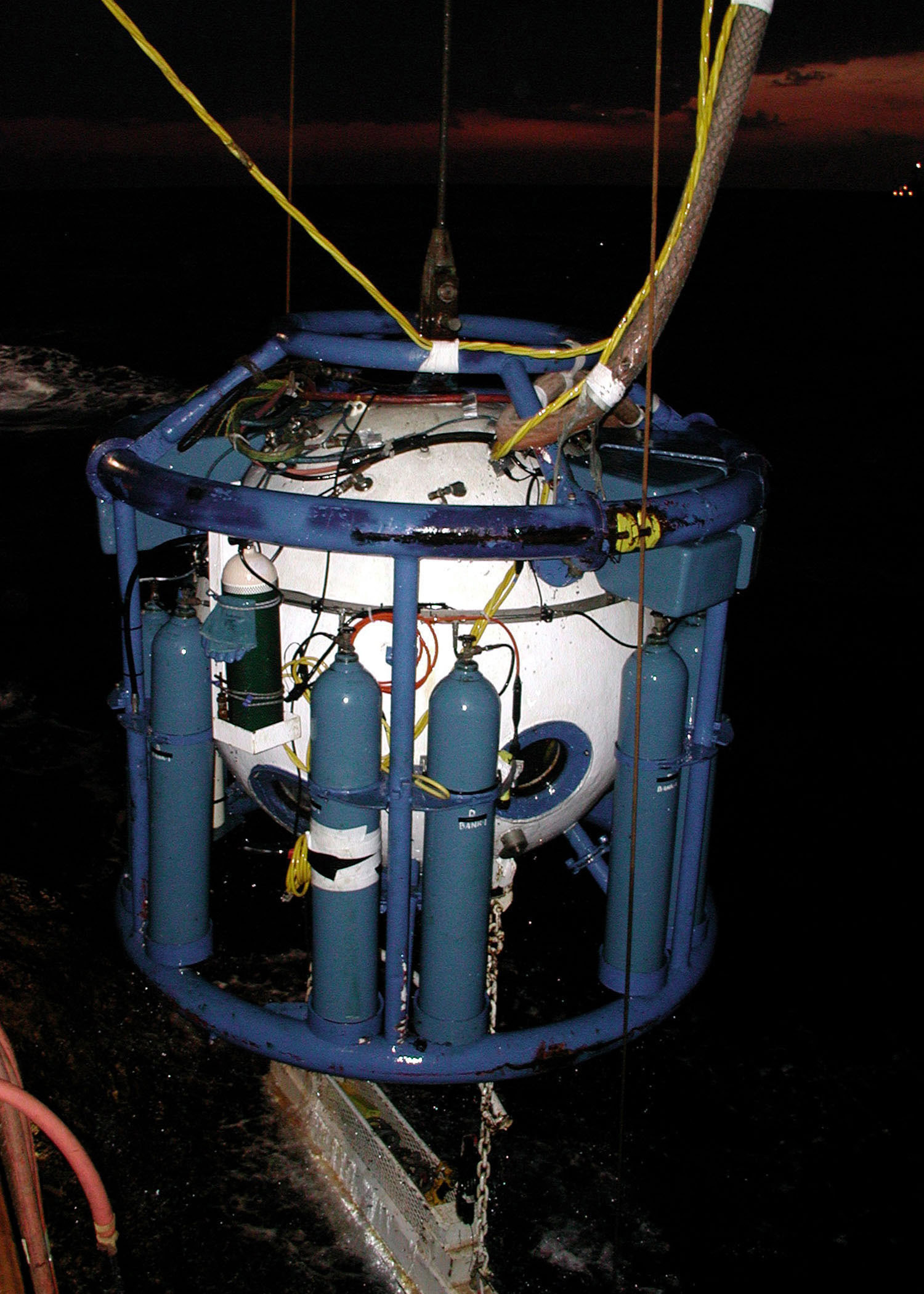
Saturation divers are transferred under pressure between the living quarters and the work site in a closed bell

Decompression sickness occurs when a diver with a large amount of inert gas dissolved in the body tissues is decompressed to a pressure where the gas forms bubbles which may block blood vessels or physically damage surrounding cells. This is a risk on every decompression, and limiting the number of decompressions can reduce the risk.

Saturation refers to the state where the diver's tissues have absorbed the maximum concentration of inert gas possible for that depth due to the diver being exposed to breathing gas at that pressure for periods in the order of 24 hours. This is significant because once the tissues become saturated, the time required to ascend from depth, to decompress safely, will not increase with further exposure.

In saturation diving, the divers live in a pressurized environment, which can be a saturation system - a hyperbaric environment on the surface - or an ambient pressure or pressurised underwater habitat. This may continue for up to several weeks, usually with the divers living at the same or very similar ambient pressure to the work site, and they are decompressed to surface pressure only once, at the end of their tour of duty or contract. By limiting the number of decompressions in this way, the risk of decompression sickness and the total time required for decompression of each diver is significantly reduced at the cost of exposing the diver to other hazards associated with living under high pressure for prolonged periods. Saturation diving is an example of substitution of a hazard expected to present a lower risk than surface oriented diving for the same set of operations.

=== Atmospheric pressure diving ===
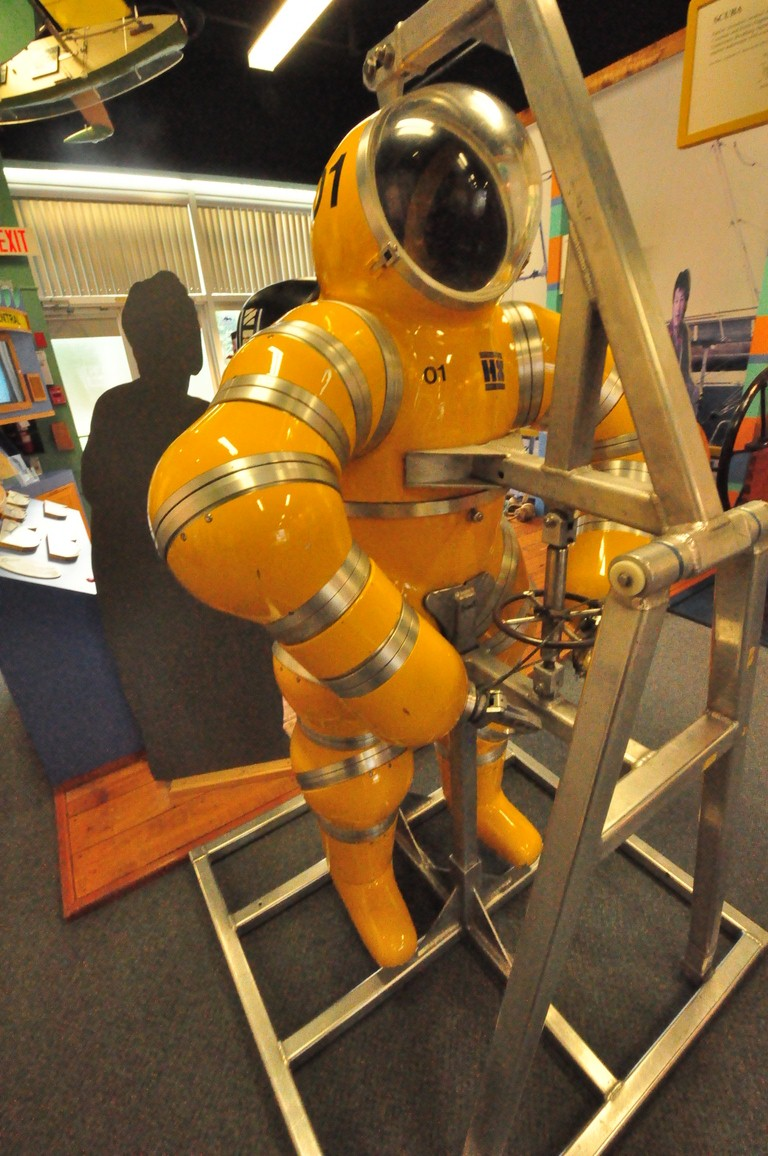
The Newtsuit has fully articulated, rotary joints in the arms and legs. These provide great mobility, while remaining largely unaffected by high pressures.

Atmospheric pressure diving isolates the diver from the ambient pressure of the environment by using an atmospheric diving suit (ADS), which is a small one-person articulated submersible of anthropomorphic form which resembles a suit of armour, with elaborate pressure joints to allow articulation while maintaining an internal pressure of approximately one atmosphere. The ADS can be used for very deep dives of up to 2,300 feet (700 m) for many hours, and eliminates the majority of physiological dangers associated with deep diving; the occupant need not decompress, there is no need for special gas mixtures, and there is no danger of decompression sickness or nitrogen narcosis, and a greatly reduced risk of oxygen toxicity. Hard suit divers do not even need to be skilled swimmers, as swimming is not yet possible in atmospheric suits. The current generation of atmospheric suits are more ergonomically flexible than earlier versions, but are still very limited in personal mobility and dexterity compared to an ambient pressure diver. Use of an atmospheric suit may be considered as substituting a relatively low risk of crushing for a higher risk of decompression sickness and barotrauma, by using the suit as an engineered barrier between the diver and the hazards, or as personal protective equipment.

=== Remotely operated underwater vehicles ===
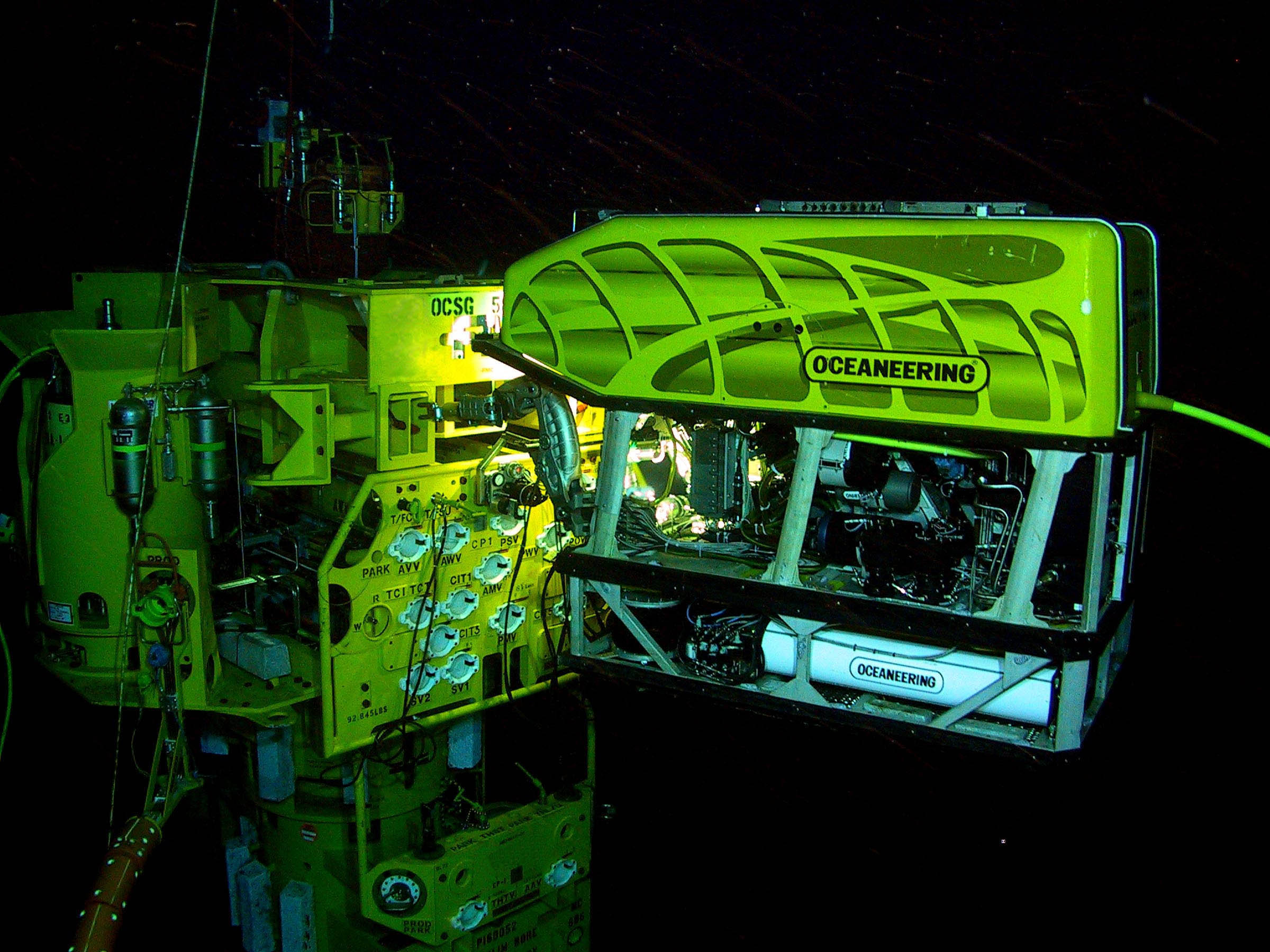
ROV at work in an underwater oil and gas field. The ROV is operating a subsea torque tool (wrench) on a valve on the subsea structure.

A remotely operated underwater vehicle (ROV) is an unoccupied, highly maneuverable, tethered mobile underwater device operated by a crew aboard a base platform. They are linked to the base platform by a neutrally buoyant tether or, often when working in rough conditions or in deeper water, a load-carrying umbilical cable is used along with a tether management system (TMS). The purpose of the TMS is to lengthen and shorten the tether so the effect of cable drag where there are underwater currents is minimized. The umbilical cable is an armored cable that contains a group of electrical conductors and fiber optics that carry electric power, video, and data signals between the operator and the TMS. Where used, the TMS then relays the signals and power for the ROV down the tether cable. Most ROVs are equipped with at least a video camera and lights. Additional equipment is commonly added to expand the vehicle's capabilities. These may include sonars, magnetometers, a still camera, a manipulator or cutting arm, water samplers, and instruments that measure water clarity, water temperature, water density, sound velocity, light penetration, and temperature. ROVs are commonly used in deep water industries such as offshore hydrocarbon extraction, where they can carry out many tasks previously requiring diver intervention. ROVs may be used together with divers, or without a diver in the water, in which case the risk to the diver associated with the dive is eliminated altogether.

== Consequences ==
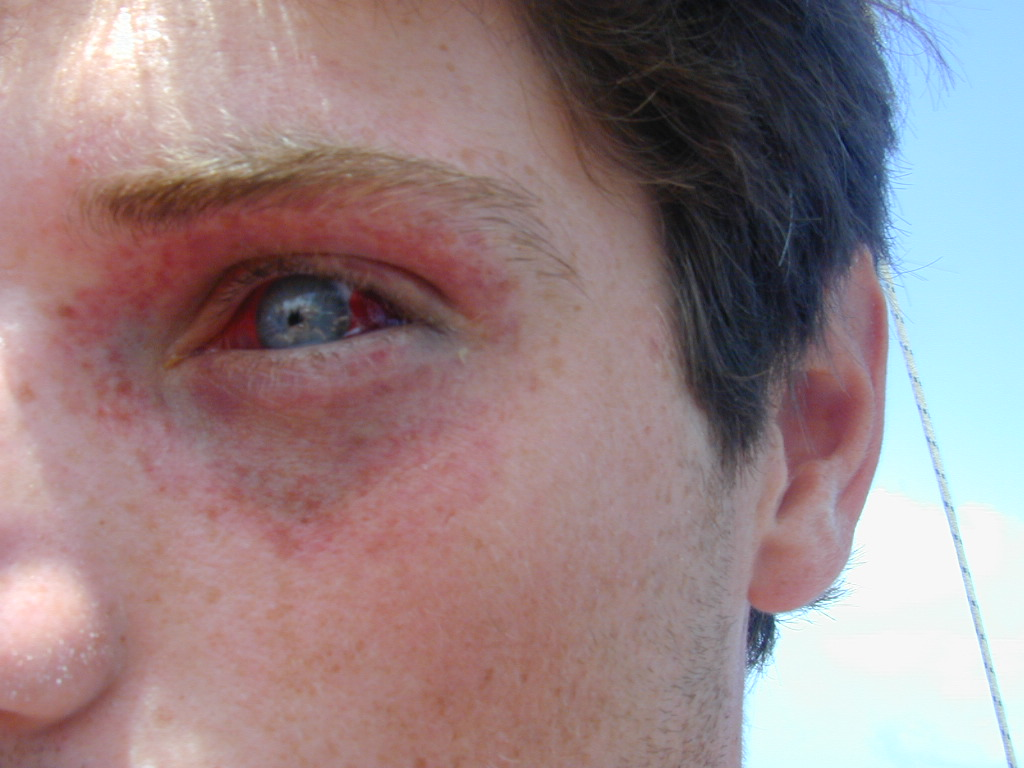
Mask squeeze barotrauma of descent

Diving related medical conditions, are conditions associated with underwater diving, and include both conditions unique to underwater diving, and those that also occur during other activities. This second group further divides into conditions caused by exposure to ambient pressures significantly different from surface atmospheric pressure, and a range of conditions caused by general environment and equipment associated with diving activities.

Disorders particularly associated with diving include those caused by variations in ambient pressure, such as barotraumas of descent and ascent, decompression sickness and those caused by exposure to elevated ambient pressure, such as some types of gas toxicity and excessive work of breathing. There are also non-dysbaric disorders associated with diving, which include the effects of the aquatic environment, such as drowning, which also are common to other water users, and disorders caused by the equipment or associated factors, such as carbon dioxide and carbon monoxide poisoning. General environmental conditions can lead to another group of disorders, which include hypothermia and motion sickness, injuries by marine and aquatic organisms, contaminated waters, man-made hazards, and ergonomic problems with equipment and tasks. Finally there are pre-existing medical and psychological conditions which increase the risk of being affected by a diving disorder, which may be aggravated by adverse side effects of medications and other drug use.

Treatment depends on the specific disorder, but often includes oxygen therapy, which is standard first aid for most diving accidents, and is hardly ever contra-indicated for a person medically fit to dive, and hyperbaric therapy is the definitive treatment for decompression sickness. Screening for medical fitness to dive can reduce some of the risk for some of the disorders.

== Risk ==
The labels used to classify dives are not sufficiently precise for analysing risk. Terms like "recreational", "technical", "commercial", "military", "scientific" and "professional" are used but are not precisely defined, particularly for risk analysis, as they do not identify specific contributors to diving risk. Categorisation by depth and obligation for decompression stops is also insufficient to classify risk. Overhead environment implies greater risk than open water.

The diving mode has a large influence on risk, and choice of diving mode is commonly based on the outcome of a risk assessment for the diving operation.

=== Probability of equipment failure ===
A system failure depends on the failure of components. In some cases the failure of any component will cause a system failure, while in others, multiple items must fail together to cause system failure. Where a system failure would have fatal consequences a backup is generally required. This is the case for breathing gas supply, and in some situations, for lights, decompression monitoring instruments, buoyancy control, and navigational equipment.

Assuming statistical independence of failure events, each item that can cause failure of the combined system is a critical point of failure and increases the probability of system failure. For the system not to fail, all items must not fail according to the formula:

${p}= 1- \prod_{i=1}^{n} (1-p_{i})$

where:

- $n$ – number of components
- $p_{i}$ – probability of component i failing
- $p$ – the probability of all components failing (system failure)

As a purely illustrative example, if there is a 1 in 100 probability of a regulator failure, and a 1 in 1000 probability of a scuba cylinder failure then

$p_{reg}=0.01$, and $p_{cyl}=0.001$

Therefore:

$$P_{fail}= 1-(1-p_{reg}) \times (1-p_{cyl})$$

Substituting values:

$P_{fail}= 1-(1-0.01) \times (1-0.001)$

$= 1-0.99 \times 0.999$
$= 1-0.98901$
$= 0.01099$ which is close to the sum of the two probabilities.

The example shows that each critical point of failure increases the probability of system failure by approximately that item's probability of failure.

If there are two completely independent scuba sets at the diver's disposal, either one of which is sufficient to allow the diver a safe return, then both sets must fail during the same dive to cause a fatal outcome. These items work in parallel - all must fail for the system to fail. The probability of this happening is extremely low for reliable equipment.

Assuming independence of failure events, each duplicate redundant item added to the system decreases the probability of system failure according to the formula:-

${p}= \prod_{i=1}^{n} p_{i}$

where:

- $n$ – number of components
- $p_{i}$ – probability of component i failing
- $p$ – the probability of all components failing (system failure)

Taking two independent sets with the same probability of failure calculated in the example above:

$p_{left}=0.01099$, and $p_{right}=0.01099$

Therefore:

$$P_{fail}= (p_{left}) \times (p_{right})$$

Substituting values:

$P_{fail}= 0.01099 \times 0.01099$

$= 0.00012078$

It is clear from the example that redundancy reduces the risk of system failure very rapidly, and conversely, that disregarding a failure of a redundant item increases the probability of system failure equally rapidly.

=== Risk management ===
Risk management has three major aspects besides equipment and training: Risk assessment, emergency management and insurance cover. The risk assessment for a dive is primarily a planning activity, and may range in formality from a part of the pre-dive buddy check for recreational divers, to a safety file with professional risk assessment and detailed emergency plans for professional diving projects. Some form of pre-dive briefing is customary with organised recreational dives, and this generally includes a recitation by the divemaster of the known and predicted hazards, the risk associated with the significant ones, and the procedures to be followed in case of the reasonably foreseeable emergencies associated with them. Insurance cover for diving accidents may not be included in standard policies. There are a few organisations which focus specifically on diver safety and insurance cover, such as the international Divers Alert Network

Risk assessment is particularly important when planning exploration dives and when diving beyond one's current range of experience. Potential points of failure and methods for managing the risk may require research beyond existing personal knowledge. In all cases the aim is to set up circumstances in which if something fails, it will fail safely.

The tools of diving risk management include:

- Checklists – Aide-memoire to ensure consistency and completeness in carrying out a task
- Hazard identification and risk assessment: HIRA is a procedure of identifying the relevant hazards and assessing their risks applied to a project, and the results would be used to inform the planners on safety related issues such as choosing the appropriate diving mode, selection of equipment and dive team members, specialised training that may be required, and contingency and emergency planning.
- Hazard analysis – Method for assessing risk
- Job safety analysis: A JSA is a procedure which helps integrate accepted safety and health principles and practices into a particular task or job operation. In a JSA, each basic step of the analysis is to identify potential hazards and to recommend the safest way to do the job. In professional diving a JSA would be done for the planned task for a specific dive, and the result would be included in the dive briefing.
- Risk control – Process in which identified risks are reduced or mitigated
- Engineering redundancy: The duplication of critical components or functions of a system with to increasing reliability of the system, usually in the form of a backup. Very commonly applied to breathing gas supplies, also common in rebreather diving for rebreather gas mixture control and monitoring. Technical divers may also carry spare dive masks, surface marker buoys, cutting devices, reels, flashlights, and dive computers.

Administrative control procedures for specific hazards include:

- Lockout–tagout is a system for identifying and isolating energy sources which constitute a risk during a diving operation. The locks prevent re-energising equipment that had been shut down until the lock is removed after completion of the work.
- Permit-to-work is a management system procedure used to ensure that work is done safely and efficiently, without conflict with other ongoing procedures. It is used in hazardous industries, often in connection with maintenance work. It involves procedured request, review, authorization, documenting and, de-conflicting of tasks to be carried out. It ensures affected personnel are aware of the nature of the work and the hazards associated with it, all safety precautions have been put in place before starting the task, and the work has been completed correctly.
- Safety data sheet provide detailed information on hazardous materials, including their risks, handling instructions, and emergency response procedures.

The Incident pit is a way of understanding the development of an incident from the pre-existing conditions, through the triggering incident, to the unrecoverable stage.

== Hazard control ==
The classic methods of hazard control are applied when reasonably practicable: The modes of diving can be considered levels of hazard control. An alternative mode of diving may include hazard elimination or substitution, engineering controls, administrative controls and personal protective equipment to reduce risk for a given activity, usually at considerable logistical cost, and often reducing operational flexibility.

Hazards to divers can be completely eliminated when a machine can do the job. There are a growing number of commercial, military and scientific applications where a remotely operated or autonomous underwater vehicle can produce satisfactory results. To a lesser extent this applies to atmospheric pressure diving, where the diver is not exposed to the environment as long as the suit integrity is maintained, but some hazards and risks remain. Hazards can be substituted by using a different mode of diving when applicable. Saturation diving is a technique that allows divers to reduce the risk of decompression sickness ("the bends") when they work at great depths for long periods of time, at the cost of substituting other, lower risk, hazards, associated with living in a saturation environment.

=== Administrative controls ===
Administrative controls include medical screening, planning and preparation for diving and training in essential skills. These requirements may be specified by regulation, code of practice, operations manual or terms or conditions of a contract.

==== Legislation, codes of practice and organisational procedures ====
Professional diving is generally regulated by occupational safety and health legislation, which can vary between jurisdictions, but tends to have some common features.

- Some form of statutory law protecting persons at work.
- Regulations empowered by the statutory law referring specifically to occupational diving activities and defining their scope.
- Codes of practice for diving activities approved or recommended in terms of the regulations.
- A requirement for employers of occupational divers to provide a safe working environment to the extent reasonably practicable, and to provide specific guidance for them in the procedures and equipment to be used by way of an operations manual.
- Training standards specifying the minimum competences required for occupational diving in various circumstances, generally associated with diving mode and depth range, and for the minimum competences of other specified members of a dive team.
- Medical standards of fitness to dive, and persons authorised to perform medical examinations on divers to assess their fitness to dive.
- Formal registration of personnel assessed as competent to perform in specified roles as members of a professional diving team, and their legal responsibilities in terms of occupational health and safety.

In most jurisdictions, recreational diving is unregulated, and an entirely untrained person is not legally hindered from scuba or freediving at their own risk in public access bodies of water. There is to some extent industry self-regulation, and most service providers will require customers to show evidence of competence appropriate to the service requested. This is usually a matter of presenting a recognised C-card, and is intended mainly to limit liability. The other instrument commonly used to limit liability is a waiver signed by the customer as part of the conditions of service.

===== Exemptions =====
In special cases exemptions may be granted for specific classes of diving operations, or for specific diving projects.

USA – Depending on state legislation, public safety diving in the USA may fall under state or federal occupational safety and health legislation. Federal legislation applies where there is no relevant state legislation and the divers are employees diving as part of their occupation. If they fall under federal legislation they are exempt (excluded) from specific requirements of 29 CFR Part 1910, Subpart T, Commercial Diving Operations, only during diving activities incidental to police and public-safety functions the purpose of which is to provide search, rescue, or public-safety diving services. The exemption was written to include the ability to deviate from safe diving practices under limited conditions where compliance would be impracticable due to time constraints or the possible consequences of failing to perform the task overwhelm the risks taken using available facilities. This exclusion does not apply during training, recovery operations, searches where there is no reasonable probability of rescue of a living person or there is no real and immediate public safety hazard. The specific federal legislation does not apply to volunteers where there is no employer/employee relationship. Scientific diving in the US is also exempt from 29 CFR Part 1910, Subpart T, Commercial Diving Operations provided that such diving is under the auspices of the American Academy of Underwater Sciences, and complies with all requirements for the exemption, which are tied to the AAUS Standards for Scientific Diving Certification and Operation of Scientific Diving Programs.

==== Medical screening ====
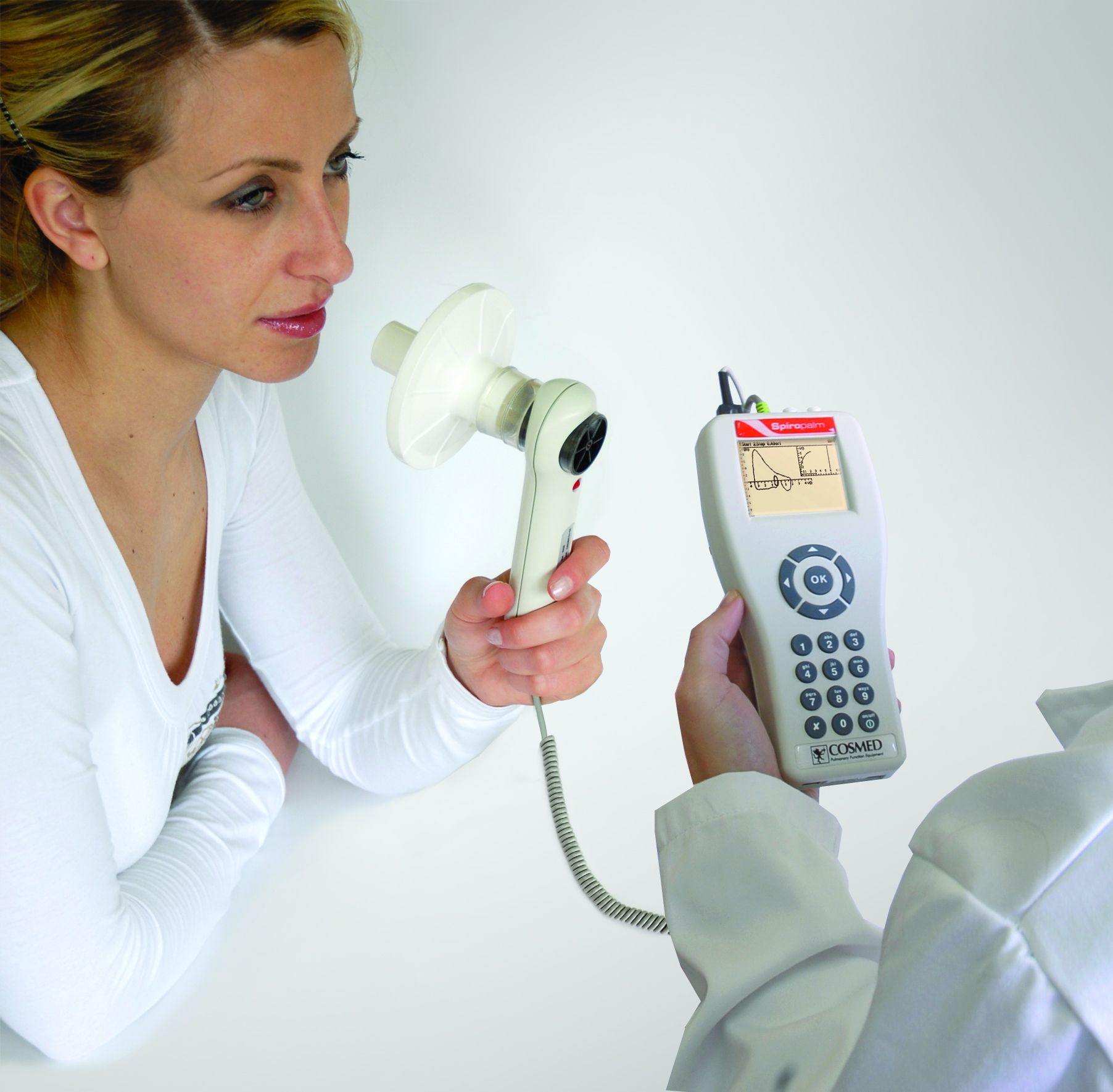
Hand held spirometer used to test lung function, one of the standard medical screening tests for divers.

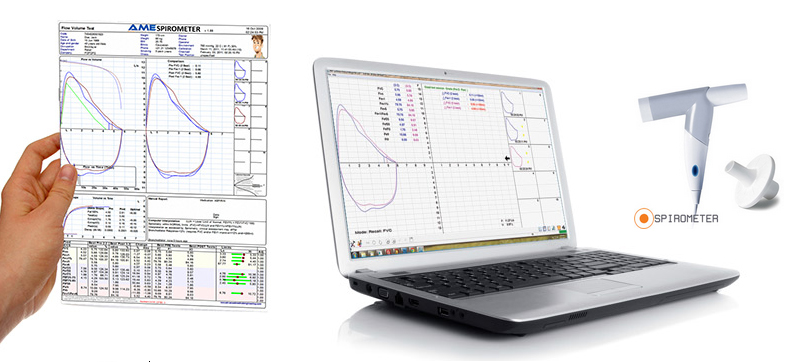
PC based spirometer output

Fitness to dive, (also medical fitness to dive), is the medical and physical suitability of a diver to function safely in the underwater environment using underwater diving equipment and procedures. Depending on the circumstances it may be established by a signed statement by the diver that he or she does not suffer from any of the listed disqualifying conditions and is able to manage the ordinary physical requirements of diving, to a detailed medical examination by a physician registered as a medical examiner of divers following a procedural checklist, and a legal document of fitness to dive issued by the medical examiner.

The most important medical is the one before starting diving, as the diver can be screened to prevent exposure when a dangerous condition exists. The other important medicals are after some significant illness, where medical intervention is needed, and has to be done by a doctor who is competent in diving medicine, and in these cases fitness can not always be established by prescriptive rules.

Psychological factors can affect fitness to dive, particularly where they affect response to emergencies, or risk taking behaviour. Overconfidence and trait anxiety are both undesirable characteristics in a diver. The use of medical and recreational drugs, can also influence fitness to dive, both for physiological and behavioural reasons. In some cases prescription drug use may have a net positive effect, when effectively treating an underlying condition, but frequently the side effects of effective medication may have undesirable influences on the fitness of diver, and most cases of recreational drug use result in an impaired fitness to dive, and a significantly increased risk of sub-optimal or inappropriate response to emergencies.

Fitness to dive can be modified to some extent by training. Physical fitness can be improved to give the diver better capacity to deal with physical challenges, and properly conducted stress exposure training can improve situational awareness and the ability to focus on relevant responses under stress.

==== Pre-dive preparation and planning ====
Dive planning is the process of planning an underwater diving operation. The purpose of dive planning is to increase the probability that a dive will be completed safely and the goals achieved. Some form of planning is done for most underwater dives, but the complexity and detail considered may vary enormously.

Professional diving operations are usually formally planned and the plan documented as a legal record that due diligence has been done for health and safety purposes. Recreational dive planning may be less formal, but for complex technical dives, can be as formal, detailed and extensive as most professional dive plans. A professional diving contractor will be constrained by the code of practice, standing orders or regulatory legislation covering a project or specific operations within a project, and is responsible for ensuring that the scope of work to be done is within the scope of the rules relevant to that work. A recreational (including technical) diver or dive group is generally less constrained, but nevertheless is almost always restricted by some legislation, and often also the rules of the organisations to which the divers are affiliated.

The planning of a diving operation may be simple or complex. In some cases the processes may have to be repeated several times before a satisfactory plan is achieved, and even then the plan may have to be modified on site to suit changed circumstances. The final product of the planning process may be formally documented or, in the case of recreational divers, an agreement on how the dive will be conducted. A diving project may consist of a number of related diving operations.

A hazard identification and risk assessment procedure is the basis of a large part of dive planning. The hazards to which the divers will be exposed are identified, and the level of risk associated with each is evaluated. If the risk is deemed to be excessive, control methods will be applied to reduce the risk to an acceptable level, and where appropriate, further controls will be set in place to mitigate the effects if an incident does occur.

A documented dive plan may contain an overview of diving activities, a schedule of diving operations, specific information on the dive plan, contingency plans, emergency plans, and a budget.

==== Following the plan ====
A basic strategy of risk management is to plan an operation and then conduct it, as far as reasonably practicable, according to the plan. If this is done, the risks will have been assessed and the equipment chosen will be suitable. Deviation from the plan brings in unassessed factors. In professional diving where a diving operation plan must be drawn up, variation from the plan generally requires reassessment of risk and recording of the deviation and any measures that were found necessary to manage the changed circumstances, but diverging to an existing contingency plan is not normally considered deviation from the plan. In recreational diving, the diver is free to plan or not, and to change the plan on whim, but technical diving certification agencies generally encourage divers to "plan the dive and dive the plan", as this is considered good practice for safety, and is the same strategy used by professionals.

Standard operating procedures (SOPs) and codes of practice (CoPs) are used to reduce the amount of detail required in dive planning. These documents provide much of the necessary detail of how frequently encountered tasks should be performed, using methods which have been tested and found to be effective, efficient and acceptably safe. When standard procedures are used, it is not necessary to detail those procedures in the dive plan, as the team members should be familiar with them already.

Standard operating procedures are the procedures identified by the diving contractor as the recommended or required way of performing a range of routine activities and codified in a document. Following SOPs is generally a condition of employment for the diving team, and the provision of SOPs may be a requirement of health and safety regulations. The document is often called the operations manual, diving manual or something similar. For example, the U.S. Navy Diving Manual, and NOAA Diving Manual,

Codes of practice are procedures identified by a larger population as preferred methods for a similar range of activities. They may be a set of industry best practice recommendations, such as the IMCA Code of Practice for Offshore Diving, a government regulated set of recommendations, or a regulated set of requirements which must be followed.

In recreational diving there are also some procedures that are widely recognised and common to most training agencies, but there are some procedures that differ between agencies, and divers may therefore differ in their expectations in some contingencies. Ideally any two divers intending to dive together in the buddy system, should use the same or compatible responses to emergencies where prompt and effective response could be a matter of life or death. This ideal does not always map well onto the common practice of buddy pairs being allocated more or less arbitrarily by the divemaster or charter boat skipper. The consequence is that some divers accept that the buddy system is degraded by this practice, and they amend their expectations by assuming that the buddy may not be of any practical assistance, and plan to be self-sufficient. Other divers refuse to dive with anyone who is not trained to the same system. Many divers simply accept the status quo and do not even question the safety implications.

==== Monitoring the progress and status of the dive ====
To follow a plan the plan must be known, permissible variations must be known, and the dive must be monitored sufficiently to be aware when permissible variations will be exceeded, so that corrective action can be taken in time, or the dive can be safely terminated, or appropriate emergency actions taken. Responsibility for monitoring the dive is shared by those members of the diving team who are best able to monitor the specific aspects, and will vary between a solo recreational scuba diver, who may have sole responsibility, to a saturation diving team, where each member has specified responsibilities under the supervisor.

==== Use of checklists ====
Studies have shown that the use of written checklists can significantly reduce the number of critical human errors in occupations and procedures where a small number of critical checks can make a proportionately large effect on the risk of the operation. These are reminders to make critical checks for people who are well aware of the need, and highly skilled and responsible posts such as airline cockpit crew and operating theatre staff, who nevertheless occasionally fail to complete the necessary preparations in the absence of a checklist. The concept has been tested on a group of recreational divers and the reduction in undesirable incidents was highly significant. Checklist systems are more common in professional diving, where the code of practice or operations manual may mandate recording that each checklist has been applied. The checklist is effective when all critical checks are listed. Additional detail may be counterproductive as distraction. More detailed checklists may be appropriate where equipment is set up and tested. The pre-dive check mnemonics advocated by diver training agencies are less reliable, as they rely on memory, vary considerably, using different terms to refer to the same or similar set of checks and the order of checks is highly variable and can cause divers trained by different agencies to become confused when diving together. In some cases the same initial has been reused in the same mnemonic for several groups of checks. A written checklist covering the safety-critical checks in a logical order avoids the distraction of trying to remember what the next item to be checked should be, and ensures that all the checks are covered, even if the checks are interrupted. There are several stages at which the use of a checklist is appropriate. These include during dive planning, risk assessment, equipment setup (particularly assembly and function testing of rebreathers), preparing the diver for the water, and in emergencies for which there is a planned response. A commonly used special case of a checklist in scuba diving is the decompression schedule for a planned dive profile, often carried by each diver in written format on a wrist slate or wet notebook.

The pre-dive equipment safety checks are an application where the use of a written checklist has been shown to reduce the incidence of mishaps which could potentially escalate to incidents with significant adverse consequences.

The use of checklists for pre-dive checks is generally considered good practice by recreational diver training agencies, but is seldom applied in practice. Pre-dive procedures include planning and organisation of the dive and preparation of equipment, which generally includes function tests of safety critical equipment and assembly of the scuba set. Occasionally a buoyancy check may be made for unfamiliar equipment. An effective pre-dive checklist would reduce the probability of failing to kit up correctly and completely before entering the water. Divers are trained to apply mnemonics to conduct pre-dive checks in training, but there is little or no follow-up to encourage their use outside of the training environment. Each training agency has its own "buddy check" mnemonic recorded in its training manual, but there is very little common ground between them, and two divers trained by different agencies to equivalent certification, are unlikely to be familiar with each other's buddy check system, while in theory they have equivalent qualifications and are considered competent to dive together. Solo divers avoid this problem by taking sole responsibility for their pre-dive checks, at the expense of losing the hypothetical double check of the buddy.

Most of the memorised checklists rely on mnemonics, which are all short and very unspecific, covering a wide range of checks, surveys and preparations, usually using a single word each to represent a series of checks on several important aspects of preparation. These checklists do not provide focused instructions, and important details of the actions to be taken may be forgotten or overlooked, or missed due to distractions. It is not known to what extent these mnemonic checklists are used in the field, and none of them have been evaluated for effectiveness. The use of a written checklist which provides sufficient detail to ensure that all necessary pre-dive checks are completed is experimentally associated with a significant reduction in unsafe conditions before a dive, and mishaps during a dive. In some cases the identification of unsafe conditions during the checks allows corrective measures to be taken, after which the dive may proceed, without associated mishap, and in some cases the dive is cancelled and the possibility of associated mishaps avoided.

Reasons cited for failure to properly complete pre-dive checks include:

- not using a written checklist,
- the checklist being over-complicated, in too much detail or in an inconvenient order,
- time pressure
- peer pressure
- distractions and interruptions
- lack of space
- overconfidence and complacency, often influenced by outcome bias

and combinations of these.

Breaking pre-dive checks into groups which are done at different stages of preparation may require some of the checks to be repeated, but can still be more effective than doing everything at the last minute, when the conditions in which the checks are done are more conducive to attention, comfort and making any necessary adjustments to the equipment. This can apply particularly to diving from small boats, when assembly of the breathing set and partial kitting up in the diving suit before launch may be necessary due to space constraints and a wet bumpy ride to the site.

==== Training, practice and experience ====
To make effective use of standard procedures, the diving team must be competent in the procedures, particularly the diving and emergency skills. These skill sets are the basis of the standard operating procedures, and have themselves been standardised to a degree where they are largely internationally accepted, and are portable between organisations without requiring much re-learning. A large part of the variation is associated with different equipment and equipment configurations, and operators need to become familiar with new equipment under controlled conditions before using them in the field. This is the realm of formal training for diving certification, which is normally done by registered diving schools and instructors, and equipment rating and familiarisation, which may be done by the employer or by diver training schools, depending on the risks and complexity of the training, and how much unfamiliar equipment is involved. For example, basic operation of an unfamiliar mode of life support equipment like surface supplied diving or a rebreather is likely to be learned at a school, while the details of operating a different model of non-diving equipment, like a hydraulic bolt-tensioner is likely to be learned from a skilled operator of that equipment, or at a manufacturer's familiarisation workshop. It is common practice to record such training and the associated assessment in the diver's logbook, as well as any certificate which may be issued.

Appropriate response to minor life-support equipment malfunctions which can be corrected by the diver is very important for diving safety. The diver is expected to deal with a number of small problems promptly and correctly before the situation escalates. Dealing with such problems as a dislodged or flooded mask, or free-flowing regulator, or correctable buoyancy fault should be done before the situation deteriorates to an emergency. A basic understanding of the physics and physiology of diving should give the diver the ability to predict the consequences of possible responses to unfamiliar contingencies. A diver with inadequate understanding may respond inappropriately to an emergency outside of their training and experience, which though unlikely remains possible. Repeated practice beyond initial competence of standard responses to the more likely contingencies develops a "muscle memory" response, which helps the diver perform the correct response under stress, and when more than one problem occurs simultaneously. It is possible to never experience one of these problems, and some divers may never need the skills in practice, but divers who do not practice the skills are more likely to be overtaken by circumstances if something does go wrong. The practice of stress exposure training in controlled conditions, where the diver is task loaded with an increasing level of simulated problems and must deal with them, is thought to develop the diver's confidence in their ability to manage an emergency effectively, which may give them the ability to avoid panic and continue to respond usefully to the situation, giving a better chance of survival.

Continued occasional practice of emergency procedures after initial training ensures that the skills are not lost due to lack of use. Divers who have not practiced their skills for several months or years are at higher risk of accidents when first returning to the water, and refresher courses and checkout dives in benign conditions are available to get the skills back to standard and thereby reduce risk of an accident.

=== Personal protective equipment ===
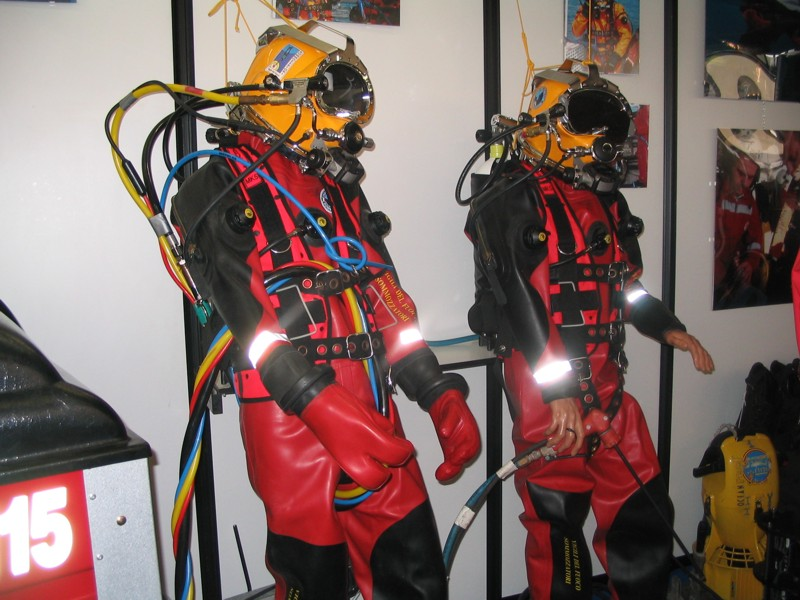
Surface-supplied commercial diving equipment on display at a trade show

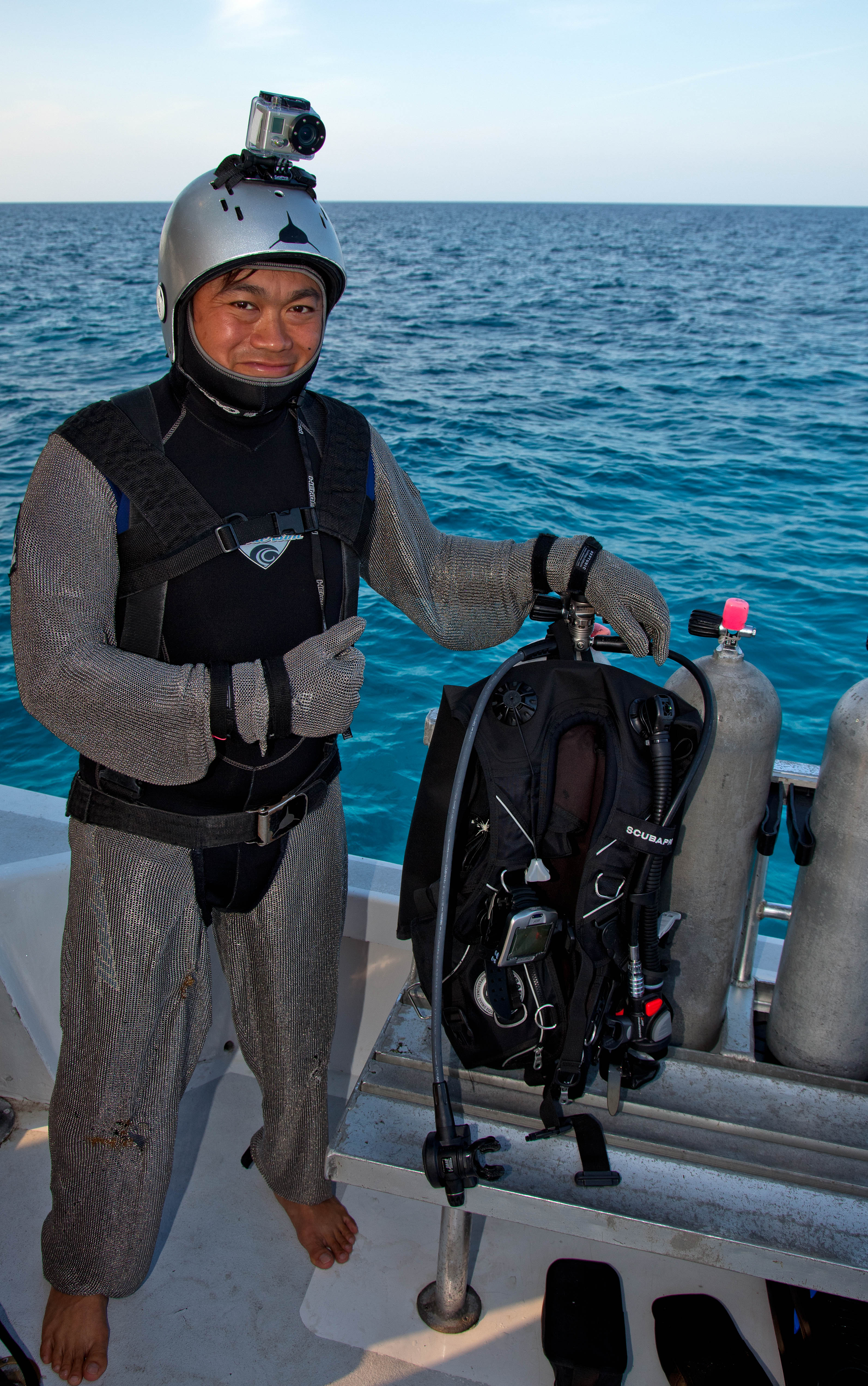
A shark bite resistant chain mail suit

A large part of personal diving equipment can be classified as personal protective equipment.

- Breathing apparatus allows the diver to breathe under water, where they would otherwise drown.
- Exposure suits - Wetsuits, Dry suits, and hot-water suits provide thermal protection to the diver. Where thermal protection is not necessary, divers may wear overalls as protection against stings, cuts and abrasions which could be caused by contact with the environment.
- Diving helmets provide thermal protection and impact protection for the diver's head, and protect the diver's airway. Neoprene hoods provide protection against high volume sound, often produced by the breathing apparatus, but also from other sources.
- Gloves and boots serve similar functions underwater to those they provide at the surface.
- Where the environment is contaminated by hazardous materials, the exposure suit, helmet, boots and gloves may be sealed together by watertight connections and the breathing gas exhaust system protected from water ingress by series non-return valve arrangements.
- Other more exotic personal protective equipment such as chain mail suits for protection against shark bites are occasionally used.

== Mitigation ==
It is not usually possible to entirely eliminate risk to a diver, and where there is sufficient residual risk it is necessary to provide mitigation for the foreseeable consequences of an incident occurring.

=== Emergency planning ===
Professional diving teams may be legally obliged to make plans and provide equipment and personnel to manage reasonably foreseeable accidents. This can include a requirement for the contractor's operations manual to include instructions for the members of a dive team in the event of any of several classes of emergency, which may include managing an injured or unconscious diver underwater or at the surface, recovery of such diver from the water, provision of first aid, provision of recompression therapy in the case of decompression illness, communication with emergency services and the contracted diving medical practitioner on standby, decontaminating divers and emergency evacuation of the worksite. Specific checklists or flowcharts may be provided with emergency plans where they may be useful to ensure correct sequencing and that no critical stage is omitted. Technical divers, and in some circumstances, scientific divers, diving at remote locations, may arrange equipment for emergency in-water recompression.

Recreational dive leaders such as divemasters and instructors may also be required to produce emergency plans for a dive site or area. The contents may vary depending on location and access to assistance, and would contain the information necessary to handle reasonably foreseeable emergencies. Content may include contact details for local emergency medical care, a casualty evacuation plan, how to arrange emergency recompression and other diving specific emergencies, and what assistance can be expected from the local emergency services.

Recreational, and particularly technical divers, are recommended by certification agencies to have some form of emergency plan in case something goes wrong. The international organisation Divers Alert Network provides a hotline service giving advice on diving emergencies, and in the case of members, authorising and arranging emergency medical assistance and evacuation.

=== Training to manage foreseeable incidents ===
A large part of diver training is in the emergency procedures known to be effective at managing the most common incidents which could be life-threatening if not managed promptly and appropriately. The amount of overlearning and the level of skill required for certification varies considerably with the training standard for different certifications, but minimum standards for recreational diver and instructors have been established by the International Standards Organisation (ISO), and national and international standards for professional divers have been published by various controlling bodies. All of these standards include management of the most frequent diving emergencies by application of well established techniques, though not always by identical procedures.

=== Emergency and rescue: procedures, personnel and equipment ===
The diver should be able to manage a reasonably foreseeable and immediately life-threatening emergency unaided as there can be no guarantee that someone else will be near enough to help, will notice and will respond appropriately in time. Lower priority threats can be managed by teamwork and resource sharing. Since most of the critical safety skills for diving are not intuitive, nor associated with activities the diver is likely to have learned for other purposes, diver safety is enhanced by comprehensive training and frequent exercise of safety critical skills.

One of the standard ways to help the diver to manage an emergency is to provide another diver ready to assist. In professional diving this is known as the stand-by diver, and in the case of bell diving, the bellman. In technical diving, similar roles may be filled by support divers. In recreational diving, buddy diving and team diving procedures are intended to provide similar benefits, where each diver in a pair or team is stand-by diver to the other or others. This system can be effective when the divers are all adequately skilled, fit and dedicated to the task, as has been shown in many deep dives and cave penetrations. The buddy diver is less effective when insufficiently skilled, inattentive, or unfit. Buddy and team diving procedures impose a significant additional task loading on the divers, particularly in adverse conditions, such as darkness, low visibility, confined spaces, strong currents, cold water and unfamiliarity with each other's equipment and habits. Nevertheless, many recreational training agencies maintain that buddy diving is intrinsically safer than solo diving.

==== Stand-by diver ====
The stand-by diver's job is to wait until something goes wrong, and then be sent in to sort it out. For this reason a stand-by diver should be one of the best divers on the team regarding diving skills and strength, but does not have to be expert at the work skills for the specific job. The stand-by diver is usually required to remain ready for deployment at very short notice during the entire working dive, and will usually be fully dressed ready to deploy, except for helmet or mask. When deployed, the stand-by diver will normally follow the umbilical of the diver who is in trouble, as unless it has been severed, it will reliably lead to the correct diver. The stand-by diver must maintain communications with the supervisor throughout the dive and is expected to give a running commentary of progress so that the supervisor and surface crew know as much as is reasonably practicable about what is happening underwater to be able to plan accordingly, and must take the necessary steps to resolve incidents, which may involve supply of emergency air or locating and rescuing an injured or unconscious diver. In bell diving, the bellman is the stand-by diver when the working diver is out of the bell, and may have to recover a distressed diver to the bell and give first aid if necessary and possible. There will generally be a surface stand-by diver in addition to the divers in the bell. The stand-by diver and working diver are generally interchangeable, unless specialised skills are required for the task of the specific dive, and professional divers are trained in rescue procedures appropriate to the equipment they are qualified to use. Rescue skills are not included in the minimum training standards for entry level recreational divers according to RSTC and ISO publications, and a diver cannot be obliged to perform procedures for which they are not qualified.

==== Incident management ====
In professional diving, the incident manager will be the supervisor, who should be trained and competent to handle procedures for the reasonably foreseeable incidents that may occur during diving operations for the range of diving operations they are licensed to control. The supervisor will advise and coordinate efforts by other participants until the affected diver or divers are handed over to a competent agency, or the casualty is assumed dead. The master of the vessel will be advised by the supervisor regarding safety of diving personnel, but remains responsible for the overall safety of the vessel and occupants.

In recreational diving, the skipper of the dive boat is likely to be responsible for the safety of the divers on or near the boat, and to ensure that everyone who left the boat to dive is back on the boat before it leaves the site. Unless there is another person specifically appointed as responsible for incident management, the skipper will generally have this responsibility by default. Competence requirements for dive boat skippers will vary depending on the jurisdiction. There is no international standard. There is no specific post for incident management for recreational shore dives. If a diving instructor is involved they will have a duty of care for their learners, and may be the best qualified person to advise emergency services, but it is likely that any emergency services contacted will have to do their best according to their code of practice. Divers Alert Network will be available to advise on best practice if one of their clients is involved, and have been known to do so as a pro bono service even when they have no direct involvement.

==== Buddy or team divers ====
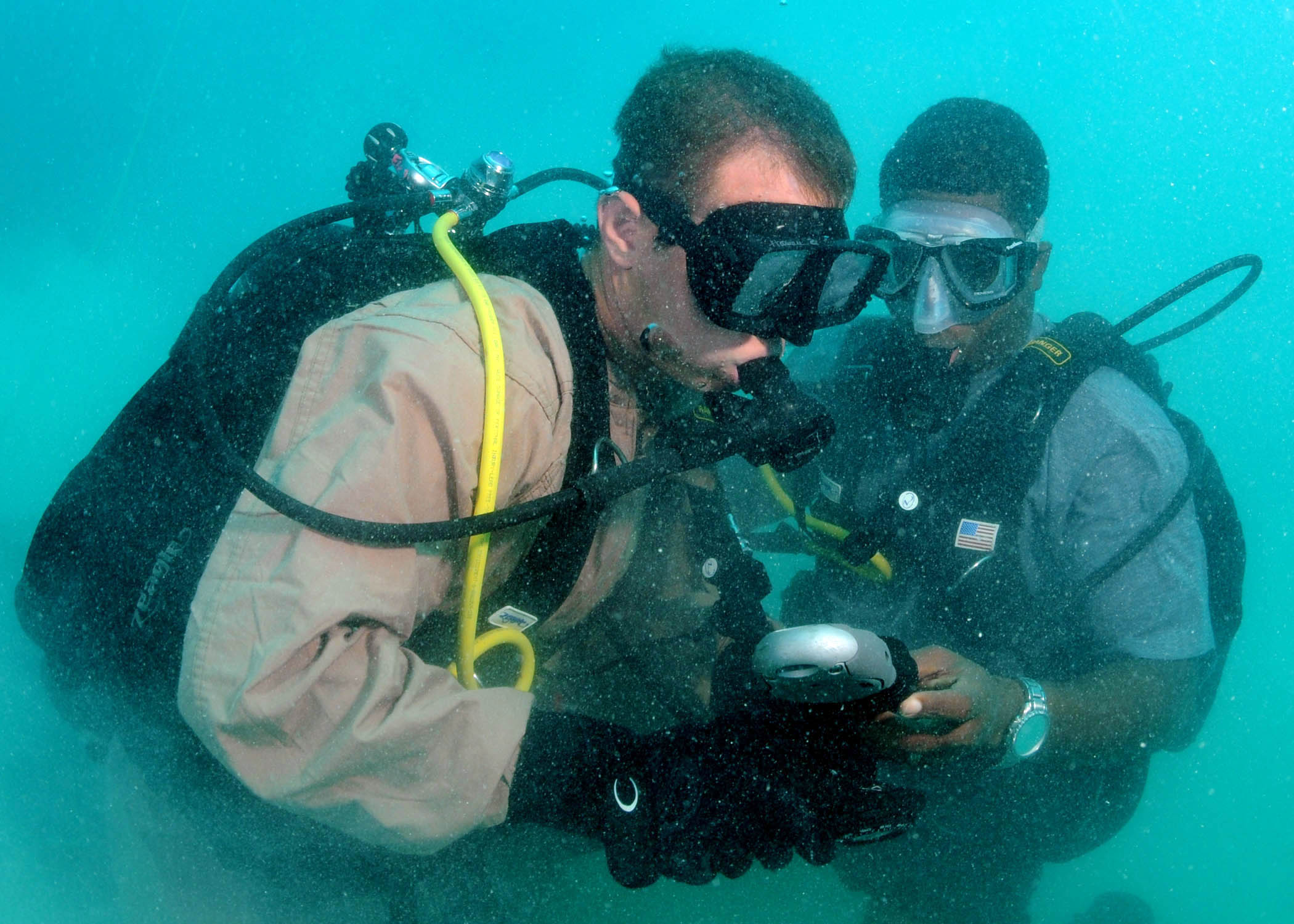
A Navy buddy diver team checking their gauges together

A buddy or team diver is simultaneously the diver and the stand-by diver for the buddy or other members of the team. Since it is increasingly difficult to keep track of a larger number of divers, and the benefits of larger groups are small, teams are usually of three divers. Larger groups are generally split up into three diver teams and pairs.

When using the buddy system, members of the group dive together and co-operate with each other, so that they can help or rescue each other in the event of an emergency. This is most effective if the divers are both competent in all the relevant skills and are sufficiently aware of the situation to be able to respond in time, which is a matter of both attitude and competence, both of which may vary with circumstances.

In recreational diving, a pair of divers is usually the best combination in buddy diving; with threesomes, one of the divers can easily lose the attention of the other two. The system is likely to be effective in mitigating out-of-air emergencies, non-diving medical emergencies and entrapment in ropes or nets. When used with the buddy check it can help avoid the omission, misuse and failure of diving equipment, though the use of a written checklist is more reliable.

In technical diving activities such as cave diving, threesomes are considered an acceptable practice. This is usually referred to as team diving to distinguish it from buddy diving in pairs. Diving in a three person team requires a higher level of situation awareness regarding the disposition of team members, but also provides a considerably enhanced support system if anything goes wrong. As a way to reduce peer pressure on the least confident or experienced diver, some certification organisations suggest making that diver the executive leader of the team, with primary responsibility for decisions regarding terminating the dive or venturing into areas of increased difficulty or risk, while retaining the general rule that any diver can terminate the dive at any time without argument.

When professional divers dive as buddy pairs their responsibility to each other is specified as part of the standard operating procedures, code of practice, or governing legislation. This may range from equal mutual support to one of the divers being appointed as the safety diver, with no task responsibilities, to the task specialist.

==== Support divers ====
A technical diving support team is a group of people organised to provide support to the divers in a similar way to a professional diving team, but without the same legal constraints. Support divers are recreational divers who are members of the support team who have made themselves available to provide in-water assistance to the primary diving team, and are typically used for a particularly complex or hazardous dive, such as in depth record attempts and major cave and wreck explorations, where the lead divers may need to spend several hours under the water, and the dive is logistically complicated. They may be chosen for useful support skills other than diving, but must be competent for the dives they are expected to do.

Such support may include deploying and recovering stage cylinders, monitoring and escorting the primary team divers during decompression, providing additional breathing gas when requested, and providing assistance in an emergency. In some cases they may function as standby divers, and not be required to enter the water during the dive unless something goes wrong.

==== Personal protective equipment for mitigation ====
Analysis of rebreather diving incidents shows that full-face masks and mouthpiece retaining straps are effective for protecting the airway if a diver loses consciousness underwater due to breathing an inappropriate gas mixture, the most common disabling agent. This increases the chances of a successful rescue. Full face masks are more effective, bit more complex and expensive. Mouthpiece retaining straps are not as effective but are inexpensive and simple to use. These measures have not been widely adopted by the recreational diving community.

== Responsibility ==
In professional diving the responsibilities of the participants are distributed according to their role in a project, and may be formally defined by legislation. The client is obliged to divulge any information they are aware of regarding hazards inherent in the site, the work, or the equipment and materials they specify. The contractor is responsible for risk assessment, specifying the mode of diving and safe practices to be followed during the diving operations, and the supervisor is responsible for job safety, following the specified procedures and managing contingencies and incidents. The diver and other members of the dive team are responsible for carrying out the operations according to the prescribed procedures and for notifying the supervisor of any changes in circumstances that could affect team safety. The stand-by diver may be required to assist or rescue the working diver in the event of an emergency. The contracted diving medical practitioner will advise on occupational health issues during the planning, and will be available through live telecommunications to advise on treatment in the event of an injury.

As professional service providers, diving instructors and professional dive leaders have a duty of care to their clients and contractual obligations to both the certification agency with which they are registered, and the client, related to the training standards and their terms of registration with the agency. Responsibilities to the client are usually restricted as far as legally possible by terms and conditions of service and waivers required of the client. Recreational divers are generally not members of the agency which issues their certification, and their responsibility for safety is often not specifically different from that of a non-diver citizen or tourist. There are some responsibilities conventionally accepted as applying to the dive buddy in terms of the training standard and recommendations of the certification agency, but the buddy is not legally bound by the standards of the agency, and is not required to put themself at unacceptable risk. There is no clear duty of care between dive buddies. There are a few countries where there are laws specifically relating to recreational diving, such as Israel and the Maldives.

=== Occupational safety and health in professional diving ===
When professional diving is done within territorial waters, the operations generally fall under national or state diving regulations, often with associated Codes of practice. In some cases exemptions from regulations may apply, such as for public safety diving in the US where a rescue is intended, or scientific diving in the US, where the diving follows an accepted code of practice approved by the American Academy of Underwater Sciences (AAUS). For work outside national territorial waters, where health and safety regulations do not apply, diving contractors may choose to work under codes of practice of voluntary industry membership organisations, like the Association of Diving Contractors International (ADCI) and International Marine Contractors Association (IMCA) International Code of Practice for Offshore Diving.

These regulations or their codes of practice define the minimum support personnel in the dive team based on the mode of diving, and require the diving contractor to follow standard operating procedures laid out in their company operations manual, or use procedures drawn up specifically for the job. Members of a professional diving team will usually include at least a working diver, a diving supervisor, and a stand-by diver. If the divers are using surface supplied breathing equipment, a diver's attendant would be required for each diver. Use of a diving bell would require a bellman. If a chamber is required on site, a chamber operator is required. When breathing gases may be switched, a Gas man will be needed to operate the gas panel. In remote locations, a diver medical technician and a diving systems technician may be required. At least two life support technicians are required to run a saturation system, as it must be monitored 24 hours a day.

Regulations or codes of practice may also require the appointment of specific personnel with responsibilities for various aspects of occupational safety, such as a diving safety officer for an organisation doing scientific diving, a diving superintendent at an offshore installation where various diving contractors may be employed, a health and safety representative, or a contracted diving medical practitioner to be on remote standby during diving operations. Periodical safety meetings may be required, and an emergency response plan, listing emergency procedures may be required for any diving operation.

Other occupational health and safety regulations may apply to diving work where any member of a dive team is exposed to relevant types of health hazard, and these may specify exposure limits for various health hazards, and occupational hygiene measures to be taken, such as exposure assessment, and workplace health surveillance.

=== Recreational diving safety ===
Regulation of recreational diving is by legislation in a few countries, but in most countries the service industries such as training and certification, and professional dive leadership are self-regulated by the certification agencies, and there are some internationally recognised training standards set by WRSTC and ISO. Recreational diving has an acceptable safety record, and the service providers protect themselves by liability insurance and waivers recording assumption of risk by the customer where the duty of care is unclear.

== Recreational diver and service provider perceptions ==
A survey on the perceptions of recreational divers and recreational diving service providers in 2018 showed that both groups considered the personal surface marker buoy and the dive computer to be the most important safety accessories. Dive centres also considered a backup mask, cutting tool, whistle and reel important, whereas divers generally did not.

The most important safety aspect that should be provided by a diving service provider was considered to be breathing gas quality, followed by staff competence, training provision, and availability of oxygen for first aid. Local availability of a recompression chamber was considered of lower importance, possibly because it is beyond the control of the diver or the service provider.

Dive centres considered that recommendations of the instructors was an important factor in allocating buddy pairs, an opinion not shared by most divers. Both groups agreed that gender, age, family connection or existing friendship were not significant factors, and divers and service providers both considered experience, buoyancy skills and emergency skills important.

About 30% of the dive centres had experience with scuba incidents and accidents, about 60% of them with decompression illness. Drowning and equipment failure each accounted for 11%, followed by boat accidents at 9%, and staff perceived these to be the highest risks. About 30% of divers had experience with a diving accident or incident, and about 60% had witnessed an accident or incident, including equipment failures and buddy separation, but also changes in weather conditions and interactions with dangerous animals.

Divers considered the greatest risks as being lost at sea, decompression illness and equipment failure, and did not consider drowning or hazardous animals to be a high risk. The population sample was considered representative of the actual members of DAN Europe, being characterised by mostly middle aged males. The study focused on perceived risk, which does not necessarily correspond to actual risk, and the correlation between diver experience and risk perception was not investigated.

The study concluded that recreational diving safety might be improved by raising awareness of risk and working towards accident prevention by training and attempting to create a culture of safety in the recreational diving industry. A hazard identification and risk assessment (HIRA) protocol and a diving safety officer programme which are similar to systems used with some success by professional divers have been developed by DAN Europe and are being offered to the recreational diving public.

== Analysis of incidents ==
The incidents that are documented and analysed are usually those which lead to serious injury or death. Valuable understanding of the risks of diving can be derived from analysis of such incidents, but they are a small fraction of the potential learning opportunities because for each documented accident there are estimated to be possibly hundreds of undocumented near-misses.

Cardiac events account for approximately 28% of diving fatalities. Approximately 60% of these divers had signs or symptoms that could later be identified as cardiac related before or during the dive, but chose to continue to dive.

DAN data suggest that limited experience is associated with diving fatalities, with entry level divers and divers certified for less than a year or with limited experience at the highest risk. Divers with very few dives in the previous year, and divers with a very large number of dives (>300) in the previous year are also high risk groups. In the first case due to lack of practice, and in the second case due to overconfidence in their proficiency.

A high body mass index may correlate to the risk of a diving emergency becoming a fatality, which may indicate a lack of exercise tolerance that may reduce the ability to successfully manage an emergency.

Root cause analysis of incidents shows four phases commonly present during the sequence of events leading to a fatality. These are: the trigger, the disabling agent, the disabling injury and the cause of death. Triggering events in decreasing order of frequency include running out of breathing gas, entrapment, equipment problems, rough conditions, trauma, buoyancy problems and breathing an inappropriate gas.

Very few out-of gas incidents are a consequence of equipment malfunctions. Most divers might have survived if they managed their gas supply correctly. Ineffective gas management puts the divers, their buddies and any other diver in the vicinity at risk. Most entrapment fatalities involved an overhead environment, where the diver was unable to make a direct ascent to the surface. While in some circumstances it is possible to enter an overhead environment by accident, it is almost always intentional or due to lack of attention to the surroundings.

The majority of the equipment failures leading to fatalities were not due to faults inherent in the equipment, but to improper use, incorrect configuration, poor maintenance or unfamiliarity with the equipment. It is more often the diver's response to equipment malfunction than the malfunction itself which results in injury or death.

The triggering event, if not managed effectively, leads to a harmful action that exacerbates the situation, and the most commonly identified harmful action is an emergency ascent, which shows that most of the divers chose to try to escape to the surface instead of dealing with the problem underwater. The next stage of the cascade/sequence is an incapacitating injury, most commonly asphyxia, which prevents the diver from making further efforts to control the incident, followed by the official cause of death as the final stage. In freediving and scuba diving this is usually found to be drowning.

In an analysis of recreational closed circuit rebreather deaths between 1998 and 2010, a somewhat arbitrary risk rating for each dive was allocated:

- low risk, for open water dives to depths not exceeding 40 metres (130 ft), where all checks and tests were done
- moderate risk, for penetration dives to depths not exceeding 40 metres (130 ft), where all checks and tests were done,
- intermediate risk, open water dives to depths between 40 metres (130 ft) and 150 metres (490 ft), where all checks and tests were done
- high risk, for penetration dives to depths between 40 metres (130 ft) and 150 metres (490 ft), where all checks and tests were done,
- extreme risk, for all dives to depths exceeding 150 metres (490 ft), or where checks and tests were not done, or alarms were ignored.

When applied to the database this indicated that about two thirds of the deaths appear to be associated with high risk behaviour.

The annual rebreather death rate of approximately 4 per 10 000 dives is approximately 10 times the rate for non-technical recreational scuba diving. Some deep diving problems have been associated with excessive work of breathing, which can reduce the capacity of the diver to deal with problems where physical exertion is required, and in extreme cases can be overwhelming even at low exertion levels.

Analysis of recreational diver behaviour indicates that using a sufficiently specific written checklist for pre-dive checks reduces the incidence of dives started in unsafe conditions in comparison with pre-dive checks following a memorised checklist, and a corresponding reduction of mishaps during the dive that might have triggered incidents with harmful consequences. There were not enough observations to correlate with actual harmful incidents such as fatalities, which are much less frequent.

== See also ==
- Diving hazards – Agents and situations that pose a threat to the underwater diver
- Diving procedures – Standard underwater diving protocols
- Fault tolerance – Resilience of systems to component failures or errors
- Near miss (safety), also known as close call – Incident that could have caused harm
- Occupational hazard – Hazard experienced in the workplace
- Occupational safety and health – Field concerned with the safety, health and welfare of people at work
- Redundancy (engineering) – Duplication of critical components to increase reliability of a system
- Scuba skills – Skills required to scuba-dive safely
- Surface-supplied diving skills – Underwater diving procedures
