= Stress exposure training =

Training in a deliberately distracting environment

Stress exposure training is the practicing of important existing skills in a stressful and distracting environment to develop the ability to perform them reliably in spite of the circumstances.

There are a number of occupations where a potentially high-stress, high-risk environment can occur, where failure to act appropriately can lead to injury, death or significant loss. These settings can be found in military engagements, aviation, emergency medicine, mining, underwater diving, parachuting, bomb disposal, police work, and fire fighting. These environments impose a high demand on those who work in them, and there is a high potential for immediate and often catastrophic harm following an error. Emergency or crisis conditions can occur suddenly and without warning.

The effects of stress on the individual are a concern in industry, the military, aviation, sports, and other settings where effective performance under stress is required. In this context, stress is a process by which environmental demands result in a perception that demand exceeds resources. This can have negative physiological, psychological, behavioral, or social effects, by restricting attention and distracting the operator from the primary task. Technical skill is a necessary but not always a sufficient condition for effective performance in a stressful environment. Effective training to reduce the negative effects of stress on performance has become important in the training community. The purpose of stress exposure training is to prepare people to function effectively under high-stress conditions.

The main purpose of training is to develop and retain skills, knowledge, understanding and abilities, and most training occurs in conditions which facilitate learning. These conditions usually involve an environment which is free of avoidable discomfort, surprises, and other distractions, allowing focused concentration on understanding and mastering the components and combinations of skills. This is generally effective when performance will be under similar circumstances, but when transferred to stressful operational conditions, reliable performance is not guaranteed.

The main purpose of stress training is to prepare the person to perform effectively in a high-stress environment. It increases familiarity with the environment and conditions in which the skills must be performed effectively, and develops the ability and confidence to perform those skills in spite of the distractions and task loading present.

== Effects of stress on performance ==
Stress is recognised as adversely altering cognitive processes such as attention, memory, and making decisions. High task loads and time pressures tend to cause narrowing of attention and loss of team perspective. Noise, thermal stress, and fatigue have also been implicated in performance degradation. Adverse environmental conditions can make effective performance physically more difficult at the same time that other distractions occur.

Theories of stress identify at least two aspects to human stress response. The appraisal process includes the person's assessment of a situation to decide whether they have the abilities and resources to cope, and has two stages:

- Firstly, threat appraisal, and determining options for coping. The perception of the existence of a threat and an inability to cope or lack of options is the cause of stress.
- Secondly, the self-regulatory mechanisms people use to control their emotions, thoughts, and behaviors in potentially threatening situations are important for directing efforts toward goal achievement in those situations. These factors help explain why some people manage to perform well under stress, while others fail to respond appropriately or make critical errors.

== Strategies for managing stress-degraded performance ==
Three basic methods exist for counteracting the effects of stress on performance:

- Exposure to stressors can be reduced by modifying the work environment or the stressor. This is a preferred strategy and is useful in many environments, but in some cases it is not possible or reasonably practicable to control the environment, and some stressors are inherently beyond control.
- Training to improve the ability to cope in stressful situations. This is the goal of stress exposure training. It is the second line of defense.
- Provision of care and support to those experiencing symptoms resulting from exposure to stress. This necessarily applies only to survivors and is an indication that the preferred options have failed.

== Training objectives ==
- Understanding of the stress environment: A lower level of stress will generally be experienced when a greater level of advance information on a stressful situation is made available. The subject is enabled to form more accurate expectations about the situation, increasing predictability and lowering surprise. The level of distraction is thereby reduced, and some planning is possible, which increases the avoidance of performance errors.
- Skill development under benign conditions: There are a wide range of stress effects that can degrade task performance. Stress training may provide practice in behavioural and cognitive skills which allow better performance under stress, such as multi-tasking skills and prioritising critical activities.
- Building confidence in the ability to perform under stress: The training is effective when a sense of mastery is achieved. Negative experiences will not have the desired effect.

== Application of the techniques ==
- Providing information: Information on stress and its likely effects is provided, and the value and goals of the training are explained, so that the learner can understand the purpose and develop a positive attitude towards the expected benefits. This also increases the sense of control and confidence, encourages realistic expectations and reduces the distractions of the stress environment, allowing more attention to task-relevant stimuli and anticipation of performance errors and what to do about them. This is generally most effective as the first phase.
- Skill building: Specific cognitive and behavioral skills relevant to the management of the stressors are taught and practiced. The critical skills may be overlearned where this is appropriate. Overlearning increases knowledge and skill retention and can retain performance under stress, but may hinder ability to adapt to new situations. Overlearning should not be used when the trained response is only useful in a limited range of situations, or when one of several responses may be most appropriate, but it may be appropriate for situations where the same response is correct each time. The goal is to build skill sufficiently to maintain effective performance in the stress environment.
- Practice under stress: The skills are applied and practiced under conditions of gradually increasing stress that are similar to those likely to be encountered in operational conditions. The full range of stressors should ideally be experienced in training, but exposure should be built up gradually, increasing the intensity or combinations after a successful demonstration of proficiency. A too sudden exposure to multiple stressors may hinder skill development. As skill in maintaining effective performance increases, the stressors are increased at a rate that allows successful performance to be maintained, and confidence in the ability to handle such conditions can grow. Learners should be aware of how realistic the stressors and combinations used in training are considered to be, so that expectations of operational conditions are realistic.

Stress-exposure training can be effective as a part of initial training or a part of refresher training, but should not be introduced before the skills are well learned or it can interfere with skill acquisition. If used in refresher training, it should follow an initial exercise and assessment of skills to ensure they are remembered and practiced correctly. It is not necessary or desirable to match the stress levels in the exercises with reality. A lower level of stress can be adequate to accustom the learner while less likely to cause a negative learning experience, but the simulations should be relevant and the situations reasonably realistic. A gradual buildup may have good results. Where stress training is optional or voluntary, a gradual buildup will allow learners to continue as far as they feel they are able to manage.

Experimental findings show that technical skill is a necessary but not always a sufficient condition for effective performance in a stressful environment, and that skills learned from stress training generalise to different tasks and stressors.

Familiarity with the stressors characteristic of the occupation is needed in order to reduce uncertainty and to improve effectiveness of learning.

== Effectiveness ==
Analyses have indicated that the training is most effective with high- or normal anxiety individuals, and effectiveness is partly proportional to the number of training sessions. Four to seven sessions were needed to produce significant improvements in performance and anxiety levels.

The training approach including all three stages has been shown to be most effective, with the skills training phase most important, and the training remains effective when unfamiliar stressors are applied. The training was also effective in preparing participants to perform tasks that had not been practiced under stress, and appears to be useful for people who may have to perform under unpredictable conditions.

== Varieties ==
- Stress inoculation training (SIT) – A clinically based system, with roots in clinical psychology, and the goal of building resistance to stress through cognitive and behavioral skill training and exposure to stressful stimuli. Trainees are exposed to sufficient stress to develop coping skills, but not so much that it overwhelms the person. These exposures and training allow the trainee to build up the ability to deal with stress, and the confidence necessary to function under greater levels of stress on the job. SIT focuses on the therapeutic input of a skilled practitioner, individualised treatment and reducing anxiety, depression and anger. It adds a fourth stage of review and analysing effectiveness of the training to that point. It was developed to reduce anxiety in doctors during times of intense stress by Donald Meichenbaum from 1985. It is used to help people with post traumatic stress disorder.
- Practical applied stress training (PAST) – An application targeting police tactical enforcement teams, developed by Will Brink and detailed in a book published in 2010.

== See also ==
- Diver training – Processes to develop the skills and knowledge to dive safely underwater
- Diving safety – Risk management of underwater diving activities
- Hierarchy of hazard controls – System used in industry to eliminate or minimize exposure to hazards
- Occupational hazard – Hazard experienced in the workplace
- Occupational safety and health – Field concerned with the safety, health and welfare of people at work
- Overlearning – Practicing newly acquired skills beyond the point of initial mastery
- Vocational education, also known as Occupational training – Studies that prepare a person for a specific occupation
