= Buddy check =

Pre-dive safety checks carried out by two-diver dive teams

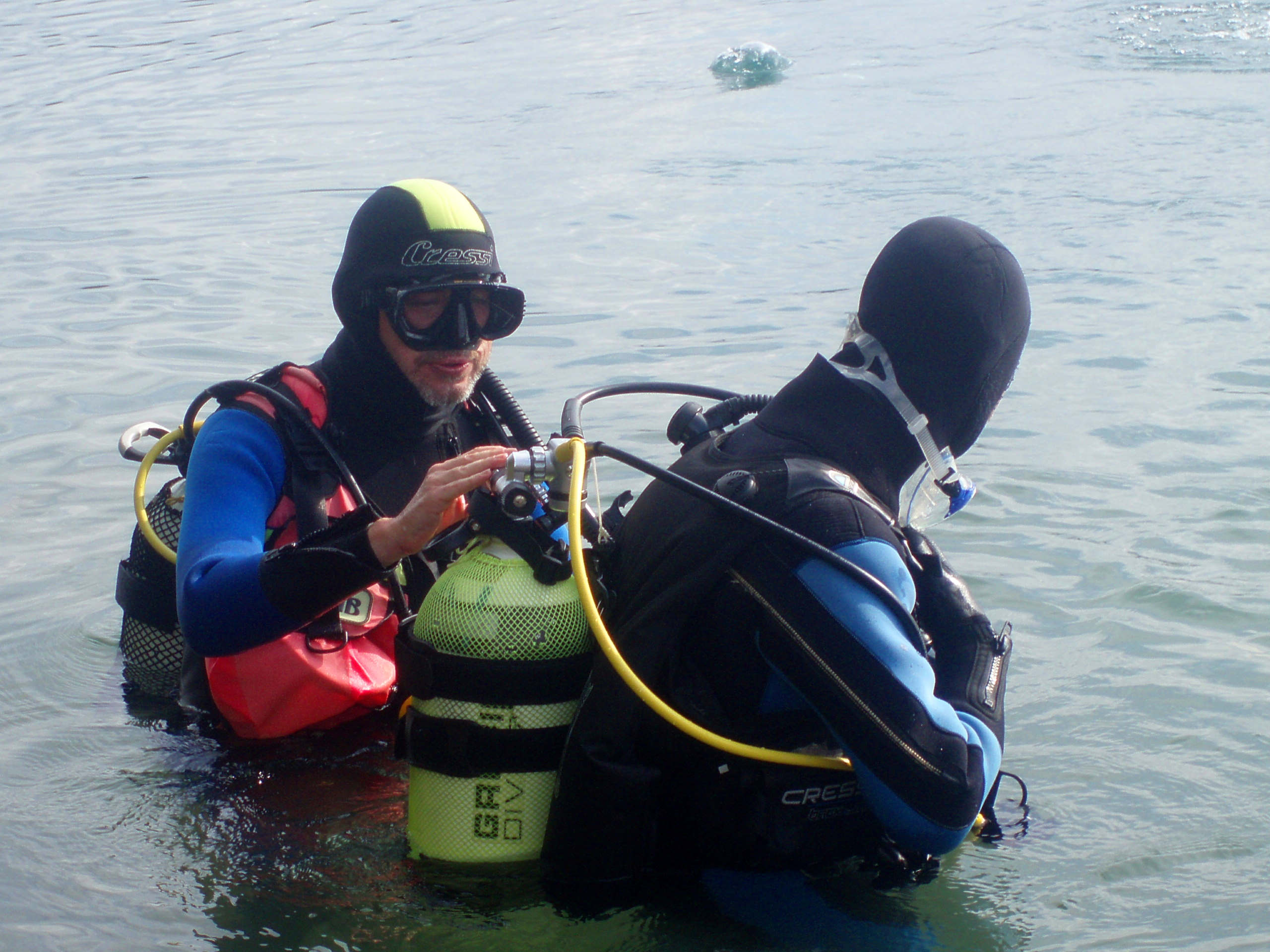
Divers doing a buddy check - This is usually done before entering the water, but there may be reasons to check again in the water if something does not appear to be right.

The buddy check is a procedure carried out by scuba divers using the buddy system where each dive buddy checks that the other's diving equipment is configured and functioning correctly just before the start of the dive. A study of pre-dive equipment checks done by individual divers showed that divers often fail to recognize common equipment faults. By checking each other's equipment as well as their own, it is thought to be more likely that these faults will be identified prior to the start of the dive. The correct use of a well designed written checklist is known to be more reliable, and is more likely to be used by professional divers, where it may be required by occupational health and safety legislation, and by technical divers, where the equipment checks are more complex.

The wide variety of types of buoyancy compensator, diving suits and types of scuba equipment means that it is important for each buddy to understand the other's equipment configuration in case one has to help or rescue the other. The buddy check is a last minute opportunity to become familiar with the dive buddy's equipment. Since many buddy pairings are arbitrarily assigned by the diving service provider just before the dive, this may be the only time the buddy pair get to familiarise themselves with each other's equipment.

Other systems are used by technical team divers and professional divers with the similar goal of ensuring that the divers are ready to safely enter the water. Professional divers may be required by organizational policy to use an itemised checklist.

== Purpose ==
The basic buddy check is a pre-dive equipment check intended to reduce the risk of the diver entering the water with life-support equipment which has not been checked to be functioning correctly. The extended buddy checks include dive planning information sharing to improve the ability of the divers to co-operate usefully both during the planned dive and in case of a contingency, and may include a review of the current conditions and a basic risk assessment. Checklists have been shown to be highly effective at reducing operator error in several fields where the correct completion of a series of tasks is of critical importance.

=== Effectiveness ===
Although generally not a written checklist, a simple buddy check can be effective in avoiding major problems due to failure to prepare critical equipment correctly. Effectiveness can vary depending on the completeness of the checks, and the attention given, and can be reduced by distractions, interruptions, and time pressure.

== Procedures ==
There are several formats of buddy check, but almost all cover these four aspects:

- Checks on breathing apparatus function and breathing gas supply.
- Checks on buoyancy and weighting equipment.
- Checks on harness security and connectors, and quick release functions.
- Checks on hose routing, attachment and presence of auxiliary equipment: Mask, dive computer, knife etc.

Buddy checks may be extended to include aspects of dive planning, to ensure that the divers are agreed on the intended activity and contingency plans. When larger groups and more complex dive plans are involved this would be considered part of the dive briefing.

- Risk assessment update
- Emergency plans
- Contingency plans
- Dive plan, including planned activities, route, decompression if applicable, and who will lead.

To be effective, all safety critical items must be checked, and shown to be functional within specification, and preferably all items that could cause a premature termination of the dive if not set up correctly should be verified to be correct. This requires some attention by the diver to ensure that all the checks are done, particularly if the sequence is interrupted to make corrections.

=== Breathing apparatus checks ===
- Adequate supply of breathing gases. (cylinder volume and pressure checks)
- Suitable type and quality of breathing gas. (correctly and unambiguously identified if applicable)
- Cylinders mounted securely and accessibly.
- Valves opened or closed as planned, accessible if applicable.
- Demand valves functioning correctly. (work of breathing low, no leaks or free-flows)
- Hose routing correct, no kinks or hoses trapped under other equipment, pressure gauges accessible.
- Demand valves secured correctly where applicable.

For rebreathers the list is longer and may include:

- Oxygen monitoring functioning if applicable.
- Prebreathing has been done to ensure scrubber function.

=== Buoyancy and weighting equipment checks ===
- Low pressure inflation hose secure and free of leaks.
- Operation of inflation and deflation valves to ensure that BCD can be filled and vented.
- Oral inflation valve function.
- Dump valves function and accessible.
- Weight belts or weight pockets in place and have the correct weight to compensate for the diving suit and other equipment.
- Trim weights secured if applicable.
- Dry suit inflation hose connected if applicable, inflation valve functions without sticking.

=== Harness security and release function checks ===
- Scuba/BCD harness adjusted and secured, buckles accessible for quick release as applicable. Straps adjusted and lying flat.
- Weight belt secured, buckle accessible. Belt free to drop clear if ditched in an emergency. Integrated weight system pockets secure, accessible and free to ditch in an emergency.
- Other equipment attached to the diver secure, accessible and can be removed if necessary.

=== Presence and condition of required equipment ===
- Diving suit fasteners done up correctly, Dry suit zipper closed, neck and wrist seals lying smooth and good fit.
- Mask (and snorkel if applicable)
- Fins
- Depth gauge and timer or dive computer. Computer set to correct gas if applicable.
- Diver's knife or cutting implement secure and accessible.
- Compass, slate, cameras etc. secure.

== Mnemonics ==
There are several mnemonics for the buddy check taught by the various training agencies. All have the intended function of ensuring that the pre-dive checks are done effectively. The equipment and procedures used by recreational divers tends to be much the same between agencies, but the mnemonics vary considerably, even in the number of groups listed, and the scope of the checks. No data on the relative effectiveness of these mnemonics has been published, and well designed written checklists have been shown experimentally to be consistently more reliable.

=== BWRAF ===
The Professional Association of Diving Instructors (PADI) use the formula BWRAF to represent the following checks:

B - BCD
Function of the BCD is tested by operating inflation and deflation valves to ensure that the BCD can be filled and can release air. Both oral and low pressure inflator valves are checked to ensure that the valves operate freely, do not stick, and the low pressure inflation hose is connected correctly. All dump valves are operated to verify that they open correctly and close automatically. Shoulder straps, cummerbund, waist belt, crotch strap and other harness components have no slack or twists, and are lying flat.

W - Weights
If a weight belt is worn, the belt is checked for security and position, and that the buckle is positioned so that it can be released by the diver's right hand. Weights on the belt should be secured to prevent sliding along the belt not and must be sufficient for the buoyancy of diver and equipment at the end of the dive, but not excessive at the start of the dive. If a weight harness is worn, or the BCD uses an integrated-weights system, the system is checked for correct assembly and function of clip release. A secondary check is to ensure that the buddy is familiar with the weight system of the diver being checked, and is able to operate it to ditch weights in an emergency.

R - Releases
The buddy will locate and check that all of the diver's harness fasteners are properly secured and they know how to release them in an emergency. This includes the velcro waist band, shoulder clips, and where present, the chest and waist clip. It is recommended to touch and name each clip as it is checked, as this makes it less likely to miss one. The tank strap and clip can be checked by testing whether lifting the cylinder causes the strap to move.

A - Air
The cylinder valve is checked to ensure that it is fully open. The practice of closing by a quarter-turn is recommended by some instructors as it leaves the valve easy to turn, which allows a quick check to ensure it is not closed. A fully open valve may be damaged if the cylinder is empty and someone tries to open it, thinking it is tightly closed, as may happen if the cylinder is empty. However, this practice has been widely discouraged, after several fatalities were attributed to divers mistakenly closing the valve and then opening a quarter turn. (This means that adequate airflow may be delivered at the surface, but restricted at depth due to increased air density.) After opening the valve, the demand valves are tested for function by drawing full breaths while monitoring the pressure gauge to ensure that the valve allows adequate gas flow. Both should breathe comfortably, and not 'free-flow' when purged. Taste and smell of the air is assessed. Contaminated air is extremely dangerous under pressure, but can often be recognized through an unpleasant, often oily, taste or smell. The secondary regulator (the 'octopus') is confirmed to be attached in the triangle between the chin and the base of the ribs, and can be released easily, to ensure easy access for the buddy in the event of an emergency.

F - Final Check
The final check ensures that hoses lead correctly and are clipped to the diver neatly, that the diver has fins, a mask, and any other accessories (cameras, reels, knife, compass, torch etc.) needed for the dive, and that these are secured to the diver, or are placed ready to be handed down once the diver is in the water.

PADI teach the mnemonic Begin With Review And Friend, but many divers have their own.

=== BAR ===
BAR is another acronym for the parts of a buddy check, used by the British Sub-Aqua Club (BSAC):

B - Buoyancy
Test and demonstrate how each buoyancy device, such as a buoyancy compensator or dry suit is inflated or vented. It is important to test common failure modes, for example, that the device remains inflated when required and that the inflation stops when required. Rebreather divers may test the breathing loop to ensure that it does not leak under a positive internal pressure and negative internal pressure.

A - Air
Test that each air source has its cylinder valve open, has sufficient gas, is functioning and has no taste. If the indicating needle of the contents gauge moves when the diver inhales that may indicate the cylinder valve is only partially open and may not provide enough gas at the higher ambient pressures at depth. An oily taste to the gas may indicate a contaminated gas fill. Some rebreather divers breathe from the loop for 2 or 3 minutes before entering the water, to check that the soda lime of the carbon dioxide scrubber is active, but this has been shown to be unreliable.

R - Releases
Check how to operate the releases that can be used in an emergency to separate the diver from the weighting system, buoyancy compensator and scuba set.

=== SEABAG ===
The National Association of Underwater Instructors uses the acronym SEABAG to address all pre-dive preparations: The first part relates to dive and contingency planning, and the second part to the equipment checks

S - Site
The site survey checks if the chosen site is acceptably diveable under the prevailing weather and tidal conditions, and whether currents or other local transient hazards are present.

E - Emergencies
The established emergency procedures and equipment are reviewed to ensure that they are appropriate for the prevailing conditions. This may include availability of emergency oxygen available and the route to the closest recompression chamber.

A - Activities
What is the purpose of the dive? Are there any special risks or concerns that must be addressed?

B - Buoyancy
Buoyancy checks include negative and positive buoyancy control devices (this includes environmental suits and equipment), and knowing where the buddy's weight and harness releases are in case they must be ditched.

A - Air
Both buddies check each other's first and second stages, confirm the locations of their octopuses, and proof check by breathing from each other's equipment. Surface Air Consumption (SAC) rates and available breathing gas are confirmed.

G - Gear
Other gear is checked.

=== DIR equipment checks ===
The equipment check is the DIR diving equivalent of a buddy check procedure. Before the dive, all members of the diving team in turn examine and announce to other team members the presence, configuration, functionality, place and form attachment of each item of their standardized diving equipment.

The complete dive plan review uses the mnemonic SADDDD:

- Sequence: Who leads, who follows, and the responsibilities of each member of the team.
- Air: Turn pressure, decompression ('deco'), bailout deco.
- Distance: Planned penetration of a cave/ wreck, how far from boat/ shore, etc.
- Depth: Planned maximum and average depths of the dive.
- Direction
- Dive

In 2006, SADDDD was replaced within the Global Underwater Explorers organisation with GUE EDGE which stands for:

- G : Goal, dive objectives
- U : Unified team, team strategies
- E : Equipment match
- E : Exposure, planned depth and time profile
- D : Decompression strategies (planned profile and contingency plans)
- G : Gas strategies (planned turn points, critical pressures)
- E : Environmental issues

== See also ==
- Buddy diving – Practice of mutual monitoring and assistance between two divers
- Checklist – Aide-memoire to ensure consistency and completeness in carrying out a task
- Dive planning – Process of planning an underwater diving operation
- Diving safety – Risk management of underwater diving activities
- Pre-dive checks – Checks done prior to entering the water for a dive
- Recreational diver training – Training process for people who do not dive at work
- Scuba skills – Skills required to scuba-dive safely
