= Dive briefing =

Meeting of the dive team to discuss details before the diving operation

A dive briefing or pre-dive briefing is a meeting of the diving team or dive group before the dive to allow the instructor, supervisor, dive leader or dive boat skipper to inform the attendees of the dive plan, contingency plans and emergency plans for the dive. The amount of detail presented should be appropriate to the dive, but there are several topics which are considered standard components of a dive briefing. The topics may vary depending on context.

On some occasions an expert or specialist may present part of the dive briefing, particularly aspects relating to specialised tasks, or vessel safety and procedures, but the overall responsibility is with the person responsible for the safety of the group for that dive.

== Purpose ==
Each member of the dive team needs to understand the objectives of the dive, and their and the other members of the dive team's roles in the dive. The dive briefing allows exchange of this information. A competent professional diver already knows how to dive and carry out the routine and standard emergency diving procedures for the equipment and conditions in which they been trained. The divers may not be familiar with the dive site environmental details or the dive boat in use, or specific details of the objective of the dive, and the specific contingency and emergency response plans for the dive, so the briefing is an opportunity to inform them of relevant information they may not already know which might affect their safety and successful completion of the objectives of the dive. The briefing usually ends by soliciting questions to ensure understanding of task and assignments, and clarification of any uncertainty.

Recreational divers may not be familiar with each other, or with local procedural details, such as the method of keeping track of who is in the water or back on the boat, buddy separation procedures, conditions for terminating the dive, recall signals, where to sit, water entry and exit procedures specific to the boat or site, how to stow their gear, and where the on-board safety equipment is kept, so this information forms part of the briefing, along with a description of the dive site, known local hazards, local rules and regulations, environmental concerns and the planned route if the dive is to be guided. In some cases allocation of buddy pairs is included in the briefing.

== Audience ==
The dive briefing targets all personnel involved with the safety of the dive and particularly the divers.

== Topics ==
As a general rule the topics of a dive briefing are those things the team members need to know to carry out the planned dive safely and effectively, at the specific site, using the equipment provided, in the conditions as they appear to be on the day of the dive. It is not a necessary part of a dive briefing to inform the team of things that they are expected to know already as competent and qualified divers. A dive briefing for a training dive may include more skill, background and review information, but the briefing should be restricted to information that is likely to be necessary or useful on that specific dive. Additional information can be counterproductive if it distracts attention from the core material, or reduces the likelihood of the important information being remembered and used correctly during the diving operation.

Scientific diving example:

Standard topics:

- Objectives of the dive
- Responsibilities of the dive team members – for a professional diving team this generally means their job designation for the dive
- Review of specific underwater tasks for the dive
- Planned dive profile – Maximum depths and bottom times for the dive, decompression scheduled for planned dive and plausible contingencies.
- Geographical extent and features of the dive site
- Review of communications: hand or line signals relevant to the planned dive and foreseeable contingencies.
- The presence and location of emergency equipment
- Diver recall signals available and the procedures to be followed.
- Buddy separation procedures
- Contingency plans in case conditions become unfavourable
- Any known hazards specific to the dive site
- Significant risks and safety issues identified in the risk assessment

Other topics that may be relevant in some cases:

- Planned and alternative methods of entry and exit into and from the water
- Use of emergency signalling equipment
- Use of special tools or equipment
- Lost diver and diver rescue procedures appropriate for the site and dive plan
- Procedures for reducing the risk of developing decompression illness.

The PADI checklist for dive briefings for recreational diving lists 10 points:

- The name of the dive site
- A description of the dive site. This should cover the layout and topography, points of interest and how to navigate between them, hazards specific to the site, sea conditions, general and maximum depth.
- The role of the divemaster in the planned dive. How the divers can recognize the dive leader underwater, where the divemaster will be relative to the group during the dive and also what they will do to attract attention.
- Entry and exit techniques to be used for the dive
- The planned procedures for the dive. This includes the suggested course, avoiding problems that may be caused by site hazards and sea conditions, recommendations for safety stops and air reserves, and the planned control of the group.
- Emergency procedures, which should include local protocols, buddy and group separation, low on air and out of air procedures, diver recall and surface signaling devices.
- Review of signals, in case some of the divers do not know the standard signals, and to inform them of local variations.
- Roster and buddy check.
- Orientation on the local environment. This includes informing the divers about the importance of not touching corals and other marine life and to be aware of their proximity to fragile organisms and their buoyancy and trim.
- Pre-dive safety check

Some of these cover things every trained diver should know, but experience has shown that entry level divers who only dive a few times a year tend to lose their knowledge and skills due to lack of practice, and need to be reminded.

== Legal status ==
A dive briefing may be required in terms of statutory law, regulation, code of practice or organisational operations manual, for diving where there is a duty of care to employees or customers, or it may be merely recommended. In jurisdictions where recreational diving is unregulated, private recreational divers are generally not required to conduct or attend a briefing when they are diving solo or in independent buddy pairs and taking responsibility for their own safety and dive planning. Clubs will often provide a briefing for groups on club outings by an experienced diver who knows the area relatively well.
