= Emergency procedure =

Plan of action to deal with an emergency

An emergency procedure is a plan of actions to be conducted in a certain order or manner, in response to a specific class of reasonably foreseeable emergency, a situation that poses an immediate risk to health, life, property, or the environment. Where a range of emergencies are reasonably foreseeable, an emergency plan may be drawn up to manage each threat. Most emergencies require urgent intervention to prevent a worsening of the situation, although in some situations, mitigation may not be possible and agencies may only be able to offer palliative care for the aftermath. The emergency plan should allow for these possibilities.

== Need ==
Organizations are frequently required to have written emergency procedures in place to comply with statutory requirements; demands from their insurers, their regulatory agency, shareholders, stakeholders and unions; to protect staff, the public, the environment, the business, their property and their reputation.

== Risk assessment ==
Before preparing a procedure, it may be appropriate to carry out a risk assessment, estimating how likely it is for an emergency event to occur and, if it does, how serious or damaging the consequences would be. The emergency procedure should provide an appropriate and proportionate response to this situation. A risk assessment is usually in the style of a table, which rates a risk on its likelihood and severity.

== Testing and training ==
An emergency procedure identifies the responsibilities, actions, and resources necessary to deal with an emergency. Once drafted, a procedure may require a consultative period with those who could be involved or affected by the emergency and a program set out for testing, training, and periodic review.

== Controlled issuance ==
When an emergency procedure is revised and reissued, previous versions must be withdrawn from point of use to avoid confusion. For the same reason, a revision numbering system and a schedule of amendments are frequently used with procedures to reduce the potential for errors and misunderstandings.

== Style and complexity ==
The document itself may be just a few lines, perhaps using bullet points, flow charts or it may be a detailed set of instructions and diagrams, dependent on the complexity of the situation and the capabilities of those responsible for implementing the procedure during the emergency.

== Business continuity planning ==
Business continuity planning may also feed off of the emergency procedures, enabling an organization to identify points of vulnerability and minimise the risk to the business by preparing backup plans and improving resilience. The act of producing the procedures may also highlight failings in current arrangements that if corrected, could reduce the risk levels.

== Escalating situations ==
Even with a well documented and well practised procedure using trained staff, there is still the potential for events to spiral out of control, often due to unpredicted scenarios or a coincidence of events. There are many well documented examples of this such as: Three Mile Island accident, the Chernobyl disaster and the Deepwater Horizon drilling platform explosion in April 2010. In a press release by BP on the 8 September 2010, BP's outgoing chief executive Tony Hayward said of this: The investigation report provides critical new information on the causes of this terrible accident. It is evident that a series of complex events, rather than a single mistake or failure, led to the tragedy.

== Review ==
It is common practise with emergency procedures to have review processes where the lessons learnt from previous emergencies, changing circumstances, changes in personnel, contact details, etc. can be incorporated into the latest version of the documentation.

== Examples ==
Some typical emergency procedures are:

- Procedure carried out during a fire alarm in commercial buildings where the occupants are evacuated via the nearest exit as the emergency services are called. Fire wardens or security may search the building to ensure everyone has left or there may be a roll call at the assembly point. The procedure would identify who is responsible for these various tasks, and their deputies, detailing other arrangements such as assisting those in the building who may have mobility issues, liaison with the fire fighters, etc. In large multi tenanted buildings the procedure may be complex and address several possible scenarios.
- Medical emergency where first aiders are called to attend an unconscious person and after checking their airways and general condition, put them into a recovery position whilst awaiting the paramedic.
- Written guidance on aircraft which indicate the steps to be undertaken by the crew to give the best chance for a successful recovery or with the least loss of life.
- Abandonment of a ship which is sinking, wrecked, or uncontrollably on fire.

Other potential emergencies that may affect an organisation include the following

- Fire – Rapid and hot oxidation of a material
- Active shooter – Perpetrator of a mass shooting
- Power outage – Loss of electric power to an area
- Bomb threat – Threat to detonate an explosive device
- Civil disorder – Forms of unrest caused by a group of people
- National emergency – Government declaration for extraordinary power
- Gas leak – Unintended escape of gas from a pipeline or other containment
- Flood – Water overflow submerging usually-dry land
- Hurricane – Rapidly rotating storm system
- Tornado – Violently rotating column of air
- Medical emergency – Acute injury or illness posing an immediate risk to life or long-term health
- Chemical accident – Unintentional release of hazardous chemicals
