= Commercial diver registration in South Africa =

Commercial divers as defined in the Diving Regulations to the Occupational Health and Safety Act 85 of 1993 are required to be registered with the Department of Employment and Labour (previously Department of Labour). The Department of Employment and Labour has jurisdiction only within the national borders of South Africa, and therefore registered diving schools are required to operate within the borders of South Africa where the Diving Regulations apply. A registered diving school is required to comply with the Code of Practice for Commercial Diver Training, and the training standards published by the department for divers, supervisors and instructors respectively.

Conditions for registration as a commercial diver in classes 1 through 6, as a diving supervisor in classes 1 through 4 and diving instructor in classes 1 through 4 are that the applicant is medically fit in terms of Regulation 20 and registered on the SAUHMA database, is in possession of an in-date first aid certificate to the specified standard (Level 1 for divers, Level 2 for supervisors), and has been assessed as competent against the training standard that applies to the class of registration by a commercial diving school registered with the Department of Employment and Labour.

Initial registration as a diver, supervisor or instructor is done through the school which assessed the person as competent against the relevant standard. This is generally the school at which the person was trained. There is no requirement for a registered diver, supervisor or instructor to renew registration periodically, but there are conditions under which registration may legally be withdrawn. Recognition of prior learning and international reciprocal recognition of diver competence applies in some cases.

== Application for registration ==
Initial application for registration as a diver, supervisor or instructor can only be done through the registered diving school at which assessment was done. Application for replacement of lost certificates can be done through the school or directly to the Department of Labour.

A registration card is issued to the applicant as evidence of registration. The format has changed over the years, but the older cards are still valid as they have no expiry date. Any card is evidence of prerequisite registration, for example, a Class 3 Instructor implies that the holder is also qualified as Class 3 and 4 diver, supervisor and instructor. Normally only one card is carried. The card is not evidence of current medical fitness to dive or current first aid registration.

=== Classes of diver ===
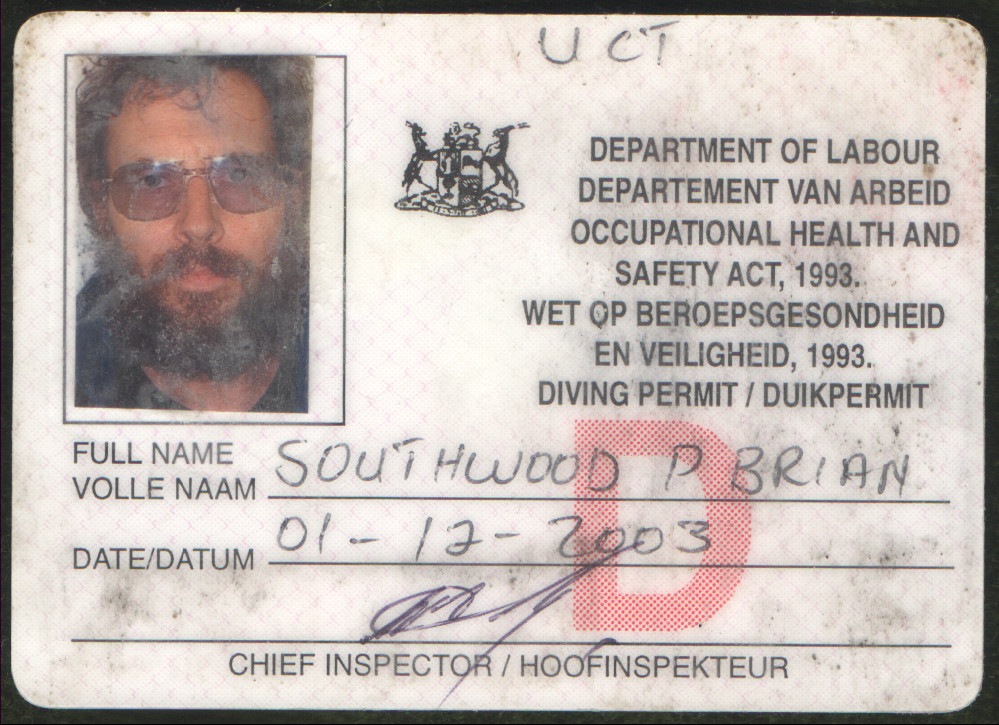
Class 4 diver registration card: SA Department of Labour 2003

The following classes of diver are defined in the Diving Regulations and training standards.

- Class 1 Diver (Class I Diver) - Commercial saturation diver
- Class 2 Diver (Class II Diver) – Commercial wet bell surface orientated diver to 50 m on air, 75 m on mixed gas
- Class 3 Diver (Class III Diver) – Commercial surface-supplied diver to 30 m on air or nitrox
- Class 4 Diver (Class IV Diver) – Commercial scuba diver to 30 m on air or nitrox
- Class 5 Diver (Class V Diver) – Scientific limited scope scuba diver to 20 m under CoP for Scientific Diving
- Class 6 Diver (Class VI Diver) – Benign water scuba diver limited to 8 m in defined benign environments under CoP for Diving in Benign Conditions.

Where not specifically limited, a diver may be employed on diving operations under whichever of the published codes of practice is appropriate to the specific operation.

=== Classes of diving supervisor ===
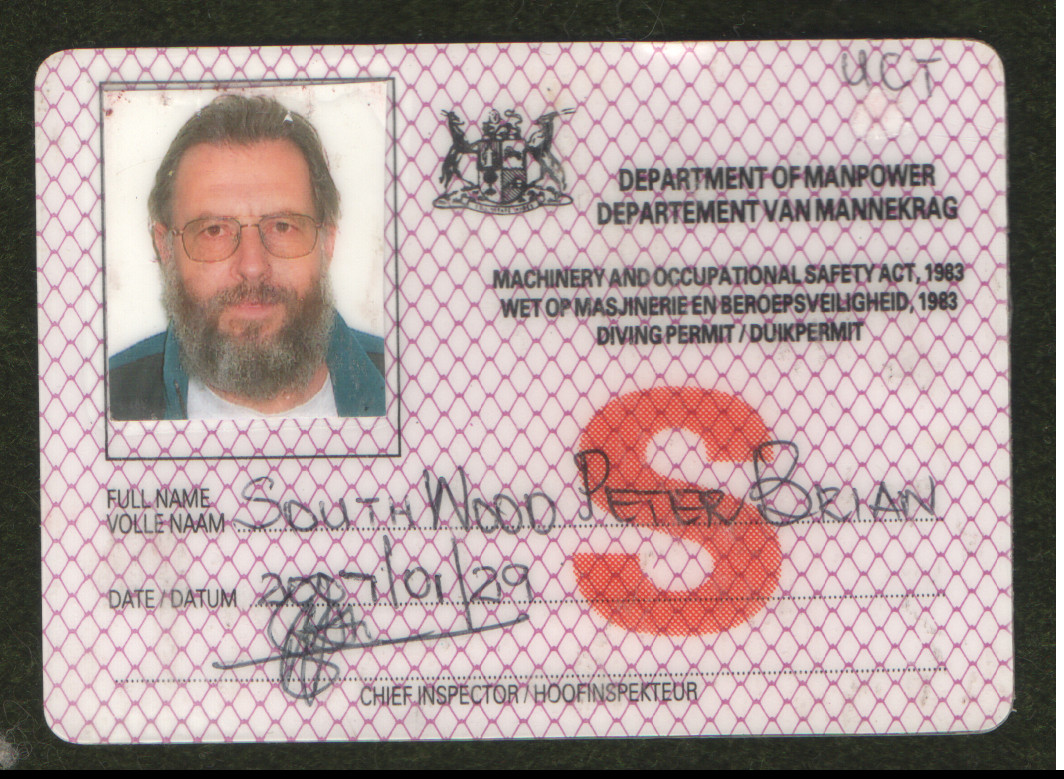
Class 4 Diving Supervisor registration card: SA Department of Labour 2007

The following classes of diving supervisor are defined in the training standards:

- Class 1 Supervisor
- Class 2 Supervisor
- Class 3 Supervisor
- Class 4 Supervisor

There are no supervisors limited to class 5 and 6 diving operations. Class 4 supervisor is the default minimum for these.

To register as a supervisor a person must, in terms of the training standard, first be competent and experienced as a diver of the same class and as a supervisor at the next lower class, except for Class 4 Supervisor, which is the initial level for diving supervisors. The class of supervisor relates to the type of diving work that may be supervised, not the class of diver that may be supervised.

=== Classes of diving instructor ===
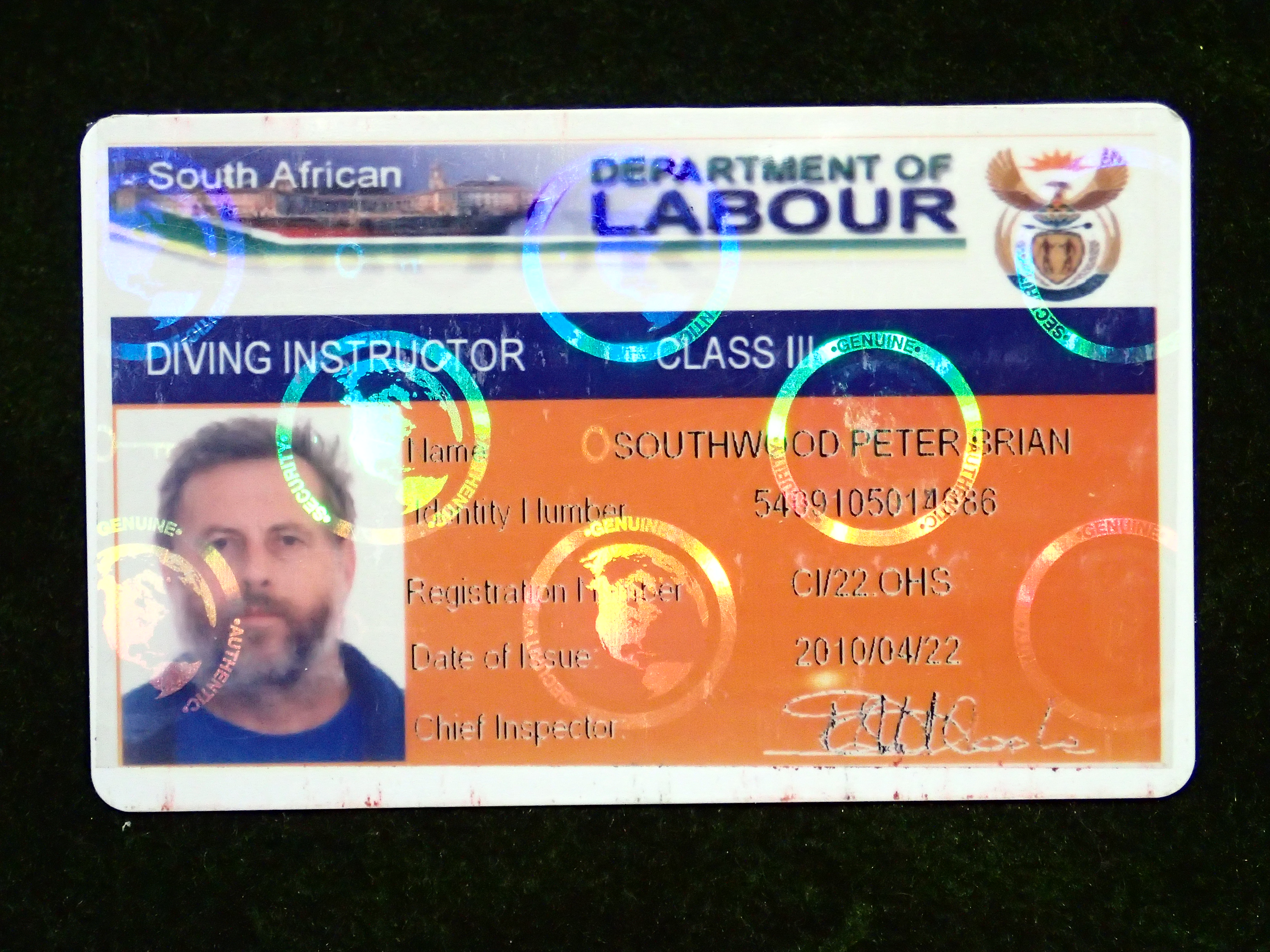
Class 3 Diving Instructor registration card: SA Department of Labour 2010

The following classes of diving instructor are defined in the training standards:

- Class 1 Instructor
- Class 2 Instructor
- Class 3 Instructor
- Class 4 Instructor

There are no instructors limited to class 5 and 6 diver training. Class 4 instructor is the default minimum for these.

To register as an instructor a person must, in terms of the training standard, first be competent and experienced as supervisor of the same class. The class of instructor relates to the highest class of diver and supervisor the instructor may be responsible for training and assessing. Registration of instructors requires specialised additional training in educational procedures such as adult education and training and assessment methods, for which diving schools are generally not registered. These requirements are acquired at other training establishments, but the final application for registration as a diving instructor of a specific class is through a diving school registered for that class of training. Special cases may be handled directly by the DAB at their discretion or at the request of the Chief Inspector.

== Other diving related occupational registration ==
- Chamber operator – A person who operates a diving chamber
- Life support technician – A member of a saturation diving team who operates the surface habitat

=== Registration of Designated Medical Practitioners ===
Designated Medical Practitioners are medical practitioners registered with the Health Professions Council of South Africa who have completed a course in underwater medicine approved by the Chief Inspector and have been designated for a four-year term by the Chief Inspector. There are two levels:

- DMP Level 1 is competent and licensed to do medical examinations for fitness to dive for a commercial diver.
- DMP Level 2 is competent and licensed to do medical examinations for fitness to dive and to advise and prescribe treatment for specific diving disorders, particularly decompression illness. Level 2 DMPs are further specified as competent for advising on air diving and mixed gas diving operations and injuries. Level 2 DMPs are authorised to act as contracted off-site medical and occupational health advisors for diving contractors.

== Registration of diving schools ==
Any person may apply to register a commercial diving school provided the requirements of the Diving Regulations, the Code of Practice for Diver Training, and the training standards for the class of registration are met This applies to staff, equipment and facilities, and an instructor registered to train the class for which application is made. A school is registered for training to a class which includes divers and supervisors of that class and all prerequisite classes. The school is not obliged to provide training in all programmes for which it is registered, but is required to remain compliant with all specified requirements while it is registered. The applicant is responsible for providing all evidence of compliance, and will be audited before registration.

=== Commercial diving schools currently registered ===
- Professional Diving Centre, Durban: Class 2
- Seadog Commercial Diving School, Saldanha Bay: Class2
- BS Divers, Hermanus: Class 2
- Jack's Dive Chest, Strand: Class 2
- Research Diving Unit, University of Cape Town: Class 3

== The Diving Advisory Board ==
The Diving Advisory Board (DAB) to the Department of Employment and Labour is a group comprising members appointed by the Chief Inspector of the Department of Employment and Labour in terms of Regulation 23 for a period specified at the time of appointment. The DAB is made up as follows:

- A chairperson who is an officer of the Department of Employment and Labour.
- A labour inspector. Where practicable this will be a diving inspector.
- A person representing the Department of Minerals and Energy (Diving on minerals and energy projects is subject to different regulations)
- A registered diving instructor (training advisor)
- A diving contractor (industry advisor)
- A registered class II diving supervisor (diving operations advisor)

Additional temporary members may be co-opted to the board as and when their expertise is expected to be useful and relevant to a specific project. With the exception of the chairperson and labour inspector, the members are not employed by or contracted to the DoL. Service on the DAB is voluntary and not remunerated, though major travelling expenses are paid.

The DAB is required to make recommendations and reports to the Chief Inspector regarding matters within the scope of the Diving Regulations and advise the Chief Inspector on matters referred to the DAB. This includes compilation and revision of training standards, assessments and codes of practice, and recommendations for revisions of the Diving Regulations.

== History ==
Previous to the Diving Regulations 2009, the registration of divers was in terms of the Diving Regulations 2001. Registrations made under the earlier conditions remain valid although the standards for registration have changed.

== International recognition ==
- International Diving Regulators and Certifiers Forum
- International Diving Schools Association table of equivalence.

Diving qualifications with specified reciprocal recognition do not require RPL as the diver may work in South Africa with the existing recognised registration. This applies only to diver registration. Supervisors and instructors must be registered locally to work as supervisors and instructors as the legal requirements are significantly different.

== Recognition of prior learning ==
Recognition of prior learning is a right of any South African citizen, but can only be applied when a registered diving school has an RPL policy and procedures in place, as it must follow that policy and procedures. Competence and experience standards for RPL are theoretically identical to the equivalent standards for training and assessment through a formal training programme. RPL for foreign nationals is at the discretion of the diving school, who will be responsible for ensuring that all standards, policies and procedures are complied with.
