= Diver training standard =

Document describing requirements of a diver training programme

A diver training standard is a document issued by a certification, registration, regulation, or quality assurance agency, that describes the prerequisites for participation, the aim of the training programme, the specific minimum competences that a candidate must display to be assessed as competent, and the minimum required experience that must be recorded before the candidate can be registered or certified at a specific grade by the agency. A standard is a description of the quality required of a product, or a way of doing something that has usually been derived from the experience of experts in a specific field. The purpose is to provide a reliable method for people to share a reasonably consistent expectation regarding the scope and quality of the product or service. Training standards allow objective comparison between the training provided by various agencies and the competence indicated by certification or registration to the specific standard, though in most cases, training and competence may exceed the minimum requirement much of the time, and variation between newly certified divers can be considerable, partly due to differences in the training, and partly due to qualities of the candidate. Training standards may narrowly prescribe the training, or may concentrate on assessment of exit level competence, and allow recognition of prior learning based on various forms of evidence. To be useful, a training standard must be sufficiently specific to allow agreement on the requirements by most readers reasonably competent in the field, including the instructors, assessors, and learners who must use it, the employers of persons trained, the potential customers, and any quality assurance personnel who may need to enforce it. A training standard may be linked to a code of practice referring to how the training should be carried out.

== Contents of a diver training standard ==
The contents would normally contain, but are not limited to, some or all of the following components.

=== Scope ===
The name of the qualification, the range of diving activities or specific skills that the holder is considered competent to participate in, and perform in conditions considered appropriate for the activities, the training authority publishing and authorising the standard, and the training establishments and personnel authorised or licensed to train according to the standard are usually specified. The training environment may also be specified.

=== Prerequisites ===
The prerequisites for diver training are basically of two types. For entry-level training the primary requirement is that the person is medically fit to dive. Further requirements are usually of the type that indicate a high probability of success in the specific training programme, such as reasonable to excellent physical fitness and swimming ability, competence in the language of training, and basic numeracy.

For advanced training the prerequisites are generally continued medical fitness to dive, and an existing certification of competence against a specific training standard or recognised equivalent, which indicates that the applicant was assessed as competent in the skills and knowledge considered necessary to allow them a good chance of success in the more advanced training program. Some training standards include a requirement for additional experience in terms of number of dives, hours of dive time or something similar, as a proxy for having practiced the prerequisite skills to the appropriate level of mastery. Other training standards allow the diver to progress directly from one training programme to the next, and assume that the experience and practice gained during training is sufficient to ensure adequate mastery to cope with the challenges of the more advanced programme.

=== Aims of the training programme ===
The detail of most diver training standards is in the description of the equipment which may be used and the conditions under which the certified diver may be considered competent to operate, and the required exit level knowledge and skill competences that provide evidence of ability to operate safely in these conditions.

=== Training methods ===
The training methods may be specified, but more often the result is considered more important than the methods, and instructors may be free to adapt their methodology to suit circumstances, particularly for theoretical knowledge. The reliable performance of critical motor skills under stress is often easiest to achieve by overlearning by repetition under varied conditions to develop muscle memory. This is usually more emphasised in professional diver training, and is also generally left to the school to ensure that skills are sufficiently practiced to be well retained. Complex skills are learned by incremental practice starting with the component actions and when mastered, combining them in more complex combinations. Stressors may be added later to further develop and test the reliability of response. This may be covered in the training standard by specifying both simple and complex skills and procedures.

=== Minimum acceptable competence ===
The minimum acceptable competence in terms of skills considered essential for a certification level that is defined by international standards agreements is interpreted by the training agencies according to their principles and applied by the individual instructors, so some variation is inevitable. The intention is generally that the diver should be sufficiently competent that the risk of serious injury or death is acceptably low for any person awarded certification and diving within the scope of their training. Competence is not a constant, and can improve with practice and deteriorate with lack of practice. Professional diver training works from the principles of occupational safety and health, and requires that the competence is sufficient to allow the diver to work effectively while diving safely in an environment that may not be ideal at the time, a situation of significant task loading, which requires a higher level of basic diving skills competence than recreational diving, where the diver is not expected to be distracted by other concerns while diving, has the option of choosing not to dive if they are not happy with conditions, and if they do task load, it is their own choice and they implicitly accept the added risk. Consequently, professional diver training tends to require more practice of safety critical skills and procedures during the training programme, and to require reliably repeated demonstration of those skills during assessment, sometimes under fairly stressful conditions.

=== Requirements for experience ===
Some skills and knowledge are not safety-critical. The learner is expected to have some reasonable working understanding of the theory and techniques and can hone their skills at the worksite. For these skills it may only be specified that they must do the exercise satisfactorily once or twice. A minimum number of hours at various depth ranges and a minimum number of dives is also a common requirement, as experience has shown these requirements to be fairly reliable at turning out reasonably competent divers.

=== Assessment ===
Theory knowledge is generally assessed by some form of written examination. In some cases the exam paper must be retained for a specified period as evidence of the assessment. Practical skills are generally assessed by direct demonstration of the skill, or where more appropriate, a simulation exercise (particularly for rescue and emergency skills, where a real emergency may be considered an excessive risk. Assessment of practical skills may be integrated with training exercises. Safety critical skills may be required to be demonstrated more than once to the required standard.

== Recognition of prior learning ==
RPL is a process for evaluating skills and knowledge acquired outside the formal education environment to recognize competence against a set of standards. It is complementary to recognition of equivalent competence, where formal assessment has already been made against an alternative standard deemed to be equivalent.

== Registration ==
The training standard may specify the procedure for applying for certification of registration, or this may be specified elsewhere such as in a code of practice or an instructor's procedures manual,

== Agencies publishing diver training standards ==
Recreational diver training standards

- List of recreational scuba diving certification agencies
- List of freediving and snorkelling certification agencies

Professional diver training standards

- List of commercial diver training and registration authorities
- List of scientific diving certification agencies

=== International and inter-agency harmonised standards ===
- World Recreational Scuba Training Council (WRSTC) – Scuba diving standards body
- Confédération Mondiale des Activités Subaquatiques (CMAS) – International organisation for underwater activities
- International Organization for Standardization (ISO) – International standards development organization
- International Diving Regulators and Certifiers Forum (IDRCF) – International forum of professional diver accreditation organisations
