= Diving supervisor =

Professional diving team leader responsible for safety

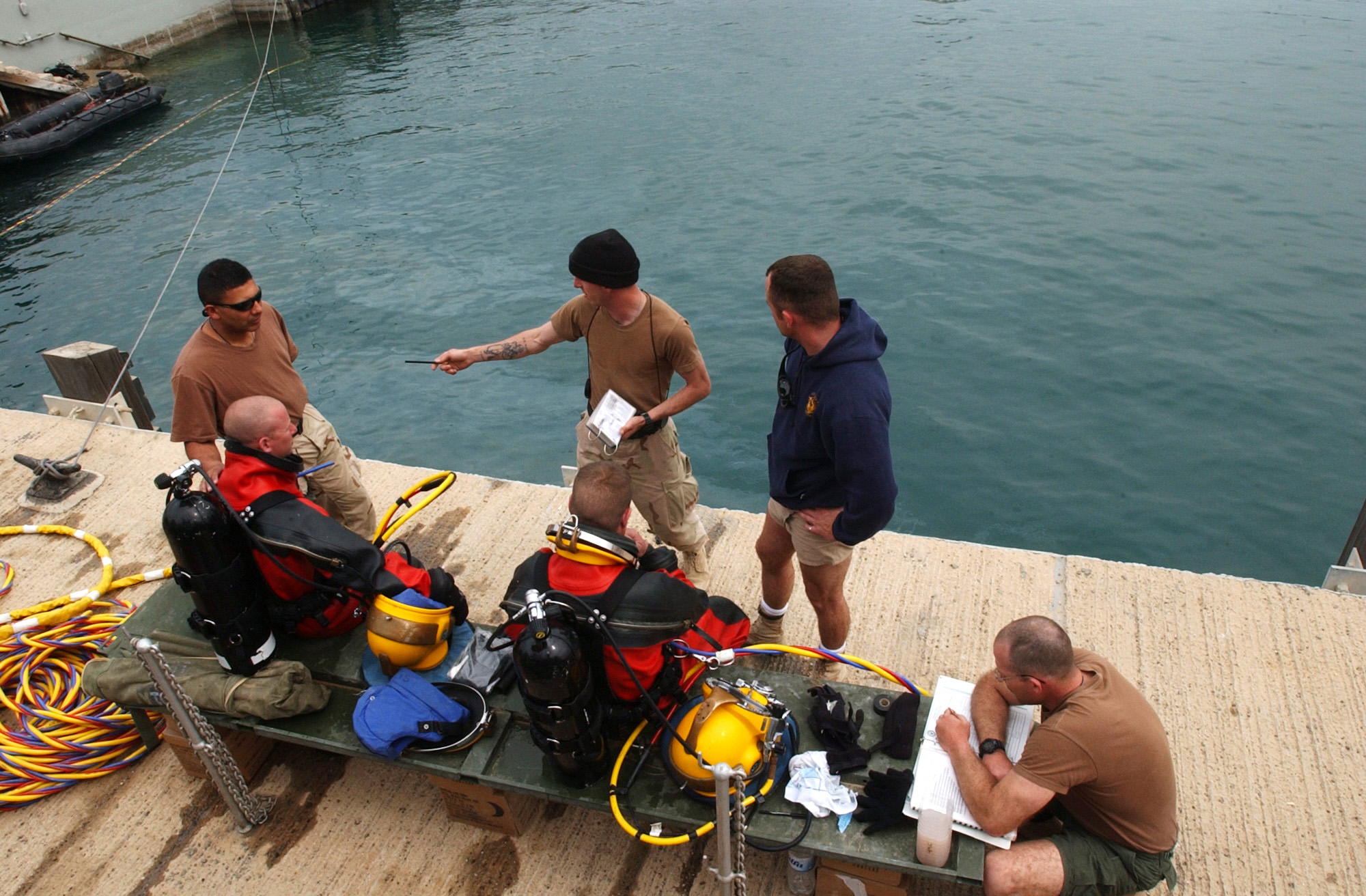
A dive team listens to a safety brief from their dive supervisor

The diving supervisor is the professional diving team member who is directly responsible for the diving operation's safety and the management of any incidents or accidents that may occur during the operation; the supervisor is required to be available at the control point of the diving operation for the diving operation's duration, and to manage the planned dive and any contingencies that may occur. Details of competence, requirements, qualifications, registration and formal appointment differ depending on jurisdiction and relevant codes of practice. Diving supervisors are used in commercial diving, military diving, public safety diving and scientific diving operations.

The control point is the place where the supervisor can best monitor the status of the diver and progress of the dive. For scuba dives this is commonly on deck of the dive boat where there is a good view of the surface above the operational area, or on the shore at a nearby point where the divers can be seen when surfaced. For surface supplied diving, the view of the water is usually still necessary, and a view of the line tenders handling the umbilicals is also required, unless there is live video feed from the divers and two-way audio communications with the tenders. The control position also includes the gas panel and communications panel, so the supervisor can remain as fully informed as practicable of the status of the divers and their life support systems during the dive. For bell diving and saturation diving the situation is more complex and the control position may well be inside a compartment where the communications, control and monitoring equipment for the bell and life-support systems are set up.

In recreational diving the term is used to refer to persons managing a recreational dive, with certification such as Divemaster, Dive Control Specialist, Dive Coordinator, etc.

== Responsibilities ==
The professional diving supervisor is the person legally responsible for the health and safety of the personnel engaged in a professional diving operation.

The supervisor is appointed for a specific operation by the diving contractor, and has the following responsibilities during that operation:

- to ensure that the planned operation is carried out as far as it is reasonably practicable—
  - without unacceptable risk to the health and safety of all those taking part in that operation and of any other person who may be affected by the operation;
  - in accordance with the requirements and prohibitions of any relevant laws or regulations;
  - in accordance with the relevant authorised code of practice;
  - in accordance with the company operations manual; and
  - in accordance with the diving project plan.
- to ensure that relevant hazard identification and risk assessment has been carried out for the project, to update it to suit the actual conditions on site, to communicate the findings of such HIRA to all members of the diving team, and ensure that it is understood and accepted by the affected parties before diving operations commence.
- to ensure that all affected parties are aware that the diving operation is imminent, and that all required signals, notifications, lock-out and tag-out procedures are in place;
- to ensure before starting the operation that everyone taking part is aware of requirements of the diving project plan which relate to that operation and that person;
- to ensure that all members of the diving team are medically fit for the work they are allocated, suitably qualified, in-date and registered, as applicable, and competent to do the scheduled work with the allocated equipment.
- to ensure that all pre-dive preparations and checks have been satisfactorily completed;
- to instruct the working diver to enter the water to start the dive;
- to monitor the progress of the diving operation and condition of the divers, and to manage gas supply, communications and decompression;
- to call a stop to operations and recall the diver if circumstances warrant;
- To instruct the stand-by diver to enter the water and go to the assistance of the working diver if needed;
- to record the relevant details of the operation;
- to maintain a personal logbook of supervision of diving operations;
- to ensure that the details of any recompression therapy are recorded in the logbook of the diver;
- to be available throughout the diving operation to deal with any emergencies related to that operation; and
- to manage any emergencies that may occur during the diving operation.

The supervisor cannot perform these duties while diving.

The recreational dive supervisor's legal position and responsibilities are not as clearly defined, and it is common practice for the person to lead a group of divers in the water. The recreational dive supervisor is expected to supervise recreational divers on recreational dives and assist in training recreational divers to the extent specified by the policies of the training organisation with which they are registered.

=== Logistics and planning ===
The diving supervisor may also be involved in diving project planning and logistics as an expert on the selection and deployment of diving equipment and personnel.

== Training and qualifications ==
A candidate for training as a professional diving supervisor is generally selected from the divers employed by a contractor, as a competent diver of the class for which he or she will be trained to supervise, and a reliable person, suitable for taking the responsibility for the health and safety of the diving team and capable of managing the logistics of a diving operation. Training as a diving supervisor is generally carried out by commercial diver training schools, which are usually registered as training providers by a national or international quality assurance body or government department, such as the Australian Diver Accreditation Scheme (ADAS) in Australia, the Association of Diving Contractors - UK (UK ADC) in the UK and the Department of Labour in South Africa. The International Marine Contractors Association (IMCA) also registers diving supervisors for offshore work.

Several classes of diving supervisor are recognized, associated with the various classes of commercial and other professional divers, and these can be roughly categorized as scuba supervisors, surface supplied air supervisors, surface orientated mixed gas supervisors and saturation diving supervisors.

Training standards and competence criteria are provided to indicate the competence requirements in various jurisdictions.

Recreational dive supervisors are trained by recreational diving instructors, and certified as divemasters, dive control specialists, dive coordinators, or whatever the specific training agency chooses to call them, by the agency with which the instructor is registered.

== Registration and appointment ==
National legislation may require the professional diving supervisor to be registered or licensed by a national or professional organisation.

- For offshore work by members of the International Marine Contractors Association (IMCA), the supervisor must be registered with IMCA,
- In the UK, the supervisor is a senior diver appointed by the contractor. There is an industry association certification scheme provided by the UK Association of Diving Contractors
- In the Netherlands, the supervisor must hold a certificate issued by the Netherlands Diving Centre Certifying Institute, NDCCI, which is the certifying institute approved by the Council of Accreditation and appointed by the Ministry of Social Affairs and Employment.
- In South Africa, the supervisor must be registered with the South African Department of Labour.
- In Australia, the supervisor for high risk work, such as construction work, is required to be trained in accordance with AS/NZS 2815. This is done through an ADAS supervisor course at a registered school. For low risk work, the supervisor is a diver experienced in the type of work, and appointed by the contractor.

The diving supervisor for a specific commercial diving operation is appointed for that operation by the diving contractor. This appointment is a legal commitment by both contractor and supervisor, and the format may be prescribed. In many cases the supervisor may be appointed to supervise the contractor's diving operations as a general condition of employment, but the requirement to ensure that the supervisor is competent and fit to supervise any specific operation remains the responsibility of both contractor and supervisor. These requirements do not generally preclude hiring a supervisor as a subcontractor, but this does not generally transfer the responsibilities of the contractor.

Recreational dive supervisors are appointed by the employer. Their responsibilities regarding diving activities at work would normally be defined by their terms of employment and certification. Their authority over clients who are not registered with the same training authority is unclear and may be undefined unless specified in the contract between the client and the employer.
