= International Diving Regulators and Certifiers Forum =

International forum of professional diver accreditation organisations

The International Diving Regulators and Certifiers Forum (IDRCF) is an organisation representing a group of national regulatory and certifying bodies for occupational diving, and other interested and affected parties. The IDRCF confirmed its principles and purpose at their meeting in London in September 2009. The statement of principles and purpose states “The forum has agreed to work together towards mutual recognition to identify and implement best practice in diver training and assessment with the objective of harmonising cross-border diver training outside Europe.”

The organisation has since changed its name to International Diving Regulators and Certifiers Forum (IDRCF)

== Members ==
Members of the IDCRF include ADAS (Australia), Diver Certification Board of Canada (Canada), Health and Safety Executive(UK), Havtil (Norway), the Association of Diving Contractors International (USA), the South African Department of Employment and Labour, and the International Marine Contractors Association (IMCA).
