= Australian Diver Accreditation Scheme =

Australian based international occupational diver accreditation organisation

The Australian Diver Accreditation Scheme (ADAS) is an international commercial and occupational diver certification scheme. It has mutual recognition arrangements with other equivalent national schemes. ADAS qualifications have international recognition.

The original Australian and New Zealand (NZ) national occupational diver certification scheme was developed by the Australian government as a not-for-profit accreditation and certification scheme. It is administered on a cost-recovery basis by the ADAS Board under the direction of the Australian Department of Industry, Innovation and Science.

Training is provided by Accredited Training Establishments (ATEs) which are required to operate at the level of international best practice as defined by ADAS.

The scheme provides the following services:

- developing training courses to meet industry needs
- certification of divers
- accreditation of training establishments
- national and international lobbying for the improved safety of divers
- promoting the mobility of ADAS licence holders around the world.

== Training ==
Diver Training is to Australian Standard AS 2815, which is in five parts.

=== Part 1 ===
Divers are trained and assessed to the requirements of Australian Standard AS 2815.1 in no-decompression diving using self-contained underwater breathing apparatus (SCUBA) with the use of hand tools underwater to depths not exceeding 30 metres in accordance with AS/NZ 2299.

This certification is suitable for work in scientific, fishing, marine archaeology, and engineering inspection applications.

ADAS Part 1 is equivalent to the United Kingdom's HSE Part IV diver qualification.

=== Part 2 ===
Divers are trained and assessed to the requirements of Australian Standard AS 2815.2 in diving using surface-supplied underwater breathing apparatus (SSBA) to depths not exceeding 30 metres in conditions where surface compression chambers are not required to be present on site by AS/NZ 2299.

This certification is the minimum level for work as a construction diver in Australia. Training may include the use of powered tools, cutting and welding, underwater construction and underwater explosives.

ADAS Part 2 is equivalent to the United Kingdom's HSE Part III diver qualification.

=== Part 3 ===
Divers are trained and assessed to the requirements of Australian Standard AS 2815.5 in diving using surface-supplied underwater breathing apparatus (SSBA) to depths of 50 metres in conditions where surface compression chambers are required by AS/NZS 2299.1.

This qualification allows work offshore in the oil and gas industry.

ADAS Part 3 is equivalent to the United Kingdom's HSE Part I diver qualification.

=== Part 4 ===
Divers are trained and assessed to the requirements of Australian Standard AS 2815.4 in diving as bellmen and lockout divers to any depth using the full range of breathing apparatus, including saturation diving.

ADAS Part 4 is equivalent to the United Kingdom's HSE Part II diver qualification.

=== Restricted certification ===
Restricted certification is available for Parts 1, 2 and 3 to divers who do not need comprehensive training in the use of plant, tools and equipment.

=== Onshore Supervisor ===
Experienced air divers are trained and assessed to the requirements of Australian Standard AS 2815.5 to supervise onshore occupational diving activities as:

- Onshore Supervisor - Occupational SCUBA Diving to 30 metres;
- Onshore Supervisor - SSBA to 30 metres;
- Onshore Supervisor - SSBA to 50 metres;;
- Onshore Supervisor - SSBA mixed gas;
- Onshore Supervisor - Aquaculture.

=== Offshore Supervisor ===
Experienced offshore air or bell divers are trained and assessed for supervision of offshore occupational diving activities as:

- Offshore Air Diving Supervisor;
- Offshore Air and Bell Diving Supervisor.

=== Atmospheric Diving System (ADS) ===
Pilots are trained to operate and maintain the ADS.

=== Dive Project Management ===
This course teaches business and project management skills related to diving projects and diving organisations.

=== Projects ===
This course teaches project management techniques and related skills relevant to diving projects.

=== Aquaculture SSBA Diver to 30 Metres ===
Certified recreational scuba divers are trained to dive on surface supply using full-face masks and with voice communications to perform tasks required by seafood divers.

=== Diver Medical Technician (DMT) ===
The DMT is trained to:

- administer First Aid and emergency treatment and carry out the directions of a doctor pending the arrival of more skilled medical aid;
- communicate with the doctor by telephone, radio or facsimile;
- be familiar with diving procedures and compression chamber operation, and
- assist the diving supervisor with decompression procedures and to advise when medical help should be sought.

=== Life Support Technician (LST) ===
Training information not available.

=== Remotely Operated Vehicle (ROV) pilot/technician ===
Based on the IMCA training standard for entry level ROV Pilot/Technicians for observation class ROV with a five function manipulator arm.

=== Chamber Operator ===
The Chamber Operator is trained in the operation and maintenance of decompression chambers.
