= Code of practice =

Set of rules regarding behavior of people working in a particular occupation

A code of practice can be a document that complements occupational health and safety laws and regulations to provide detailed practical guidance on how to comply with legal obligations, and should be followed unless another solution with the same or better health and safety standard is in place, or may be a document for the same purpose published by a self-regulating body to be followed by member organisations.

Codes of practice published by governments do not replace the occupational health and safety laws and regulations, and are generally issued in terms of those laws and regulations. They are intended to help understand how to comply with the requirements of regulations. A workplace inspector can refer to a code of practice when issuing an improvement or prohibition notice, and they may be admissible in court proceedings. A court may use a code of practice to establish what is reasonably practicable action to manage a specific risk. Equivalent or better ways of achieving the required work health and safety may be possible, so compliance with codes of practice is not usually mandatory, providing that any alternative systems used provide a standard of health and safety equal to or better than those recommended by the code of practice.

Organisational codes of practice do not have the same authority under law, but serve a similar purpose. Member organisations generally undertake to comply with the codes of practice as a condition of membership and may lose membership if found to be in violation of the code.

== Examples ==
- National Association of Broadcasters, Code of Practices for Television Broadcasters, 1951 onwards
- UNESCO, Code of Practice for Scientific Diving, 1988
- European Commission, Code of Practice on measures to combat sexual harassment [at work], 1991
