= Diving procedures =

Standard underwater diving protocols

Diving procedures are standardised methods of doing things that are commonly useful while diving that are known to work effectively and acceptably safely. Due to the inherent risks of the environment and the necessity to operate the equipment correctly, both under normal conditions and during incidents where failure to respond appropriately and quickly can have fatal consequences, a set of standard procedures are used in preparation of the equipment, preparation to dive, during the dive if all goes according to plan, after the dive, and in the event of a reasonably foreseeable contingency. Standard procedures are not necessarily the only courses of action that produce a satisfactory outcome, but they are generally those procedures that experiment and experience show to work well and reliably in response to given circumstances. All formal diver training is based on the learning of standard skills and procedures, and in many cases the over-learning of the skills until the procedures can be performed without hesitation even when distracting circumstances exist. Where reasonably practicable, checklists may be used to ensure that preparatory and maintenance procedures are carried out in the correct sequence and that no steps are inadvertently omitted.

Some procedures are common to all manned modes of diving, but most are specific to the mode of diving and many are specific to the equipment in use. Diving procedures are those directly relevant to diving safety and efficiency, but do not include task specific skills. Standard procedures are particularly helpful where communication is by hand or rope signal – the hand and line signals are examples of standard procedures themselves – as the communicating parties have a better idea of what the other is likely to do in response. Where voice communication is available, standardised communications protocol reduces both the time needed to convey necessary information and the error rate in transmission.

Diving procedures generally involve the correct application of the appropriate diving skills in response to the current circumstances, and range from selecting and testing equipment to suit the diver and the dive plan, to the rescue of oneself or another diver in a life-threatening emergency. In many cases, what might be a life-threatening emergency to an untrained or inadequately skilled diver, is a mere annoyance and minor distraction to a skilled diver who applies the correct procedure without hesitation. Professional diving operations tend to adhere more rigidly to standard operating procedures than recreational divers, who are not legally or contractually obliged to follow them, but the prevalence of diving accidents is known to be strongly correlated to human error, which is more common in divers with less training and experience. The Doing It Right philosophy of technical diving is strongly supportive of common standard procedures for all members of a dive team, and prescribe the procedures and equipment configuration that may affect procedures to the members of their organisations.

The terms diving skills and diving procedures are largely interchangeable, but a procedure may require the ordered application of several skills, and is a broader term. A procedure may also conditionally branch or require repeated applications of a skill, depending on circumstances. Diver training is structured around the learning and practice of standard procedures until the diver is assessed as competent to apply them reliably in reasonably foreseeable circumstances, and the certification issued limits the diver to environments and equipment that are compatible with their training and assessed skill levels. The teaching and assessment of diving skills and procedures is often restricted to registered instructors, who have been assessed as competent to teach and assess those skills by the certification or registration agency, who take the responsibility of declaring the diver competent against their assessment criteria. The teaching and assessment of other task oriented skills does not generally require a diving instructor. There is considerable difference in the diving procedures of professional divers, where a diving team with formally appointed members in specific roles and with recognised competence is required by law, and recreational diving, where in most jurisdictions the diver is not constrained by specific laws, and in many cases is not required by law to provide any evidence of competence.

== Routine diving procedures ==
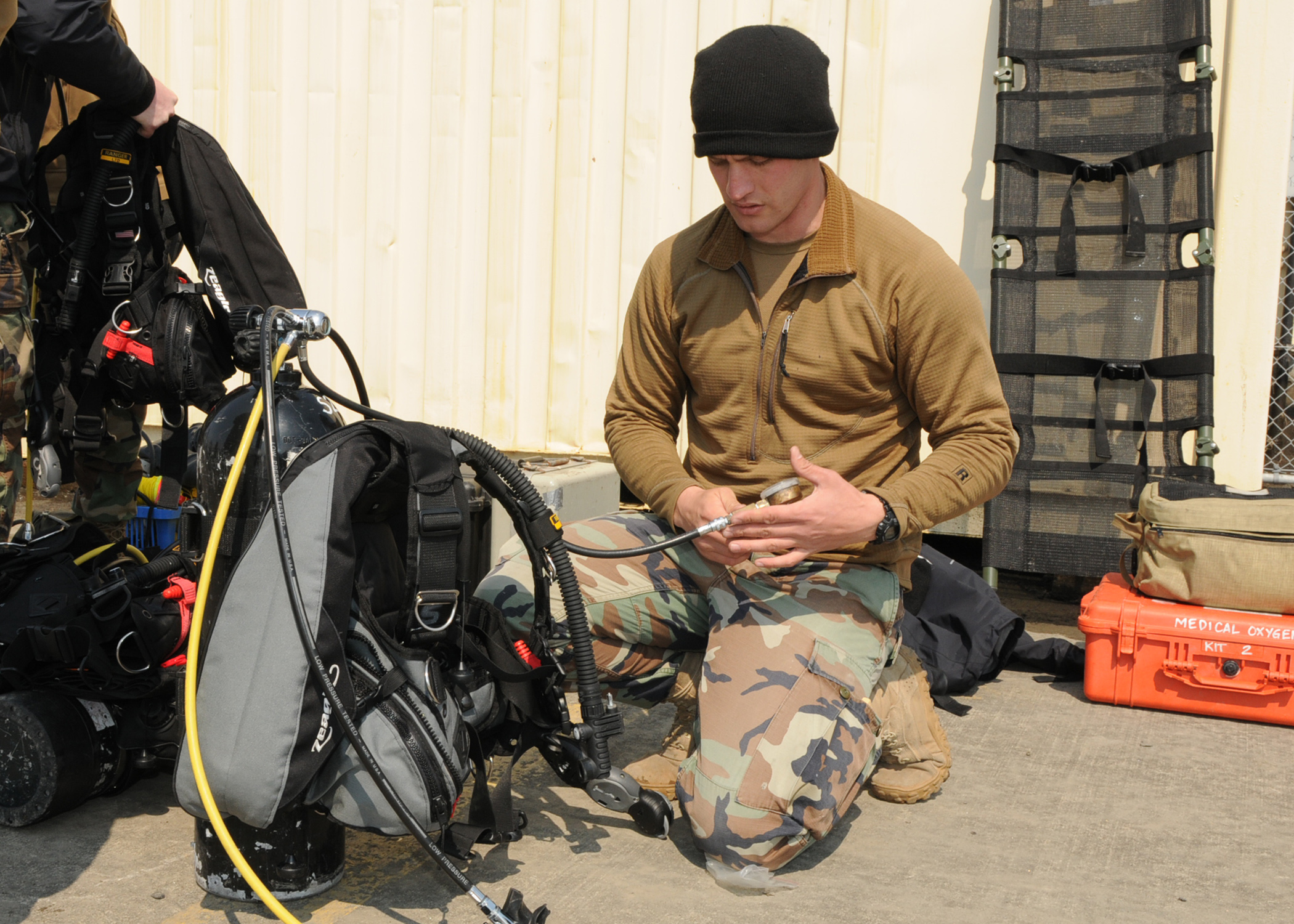
Checking equipment function before use

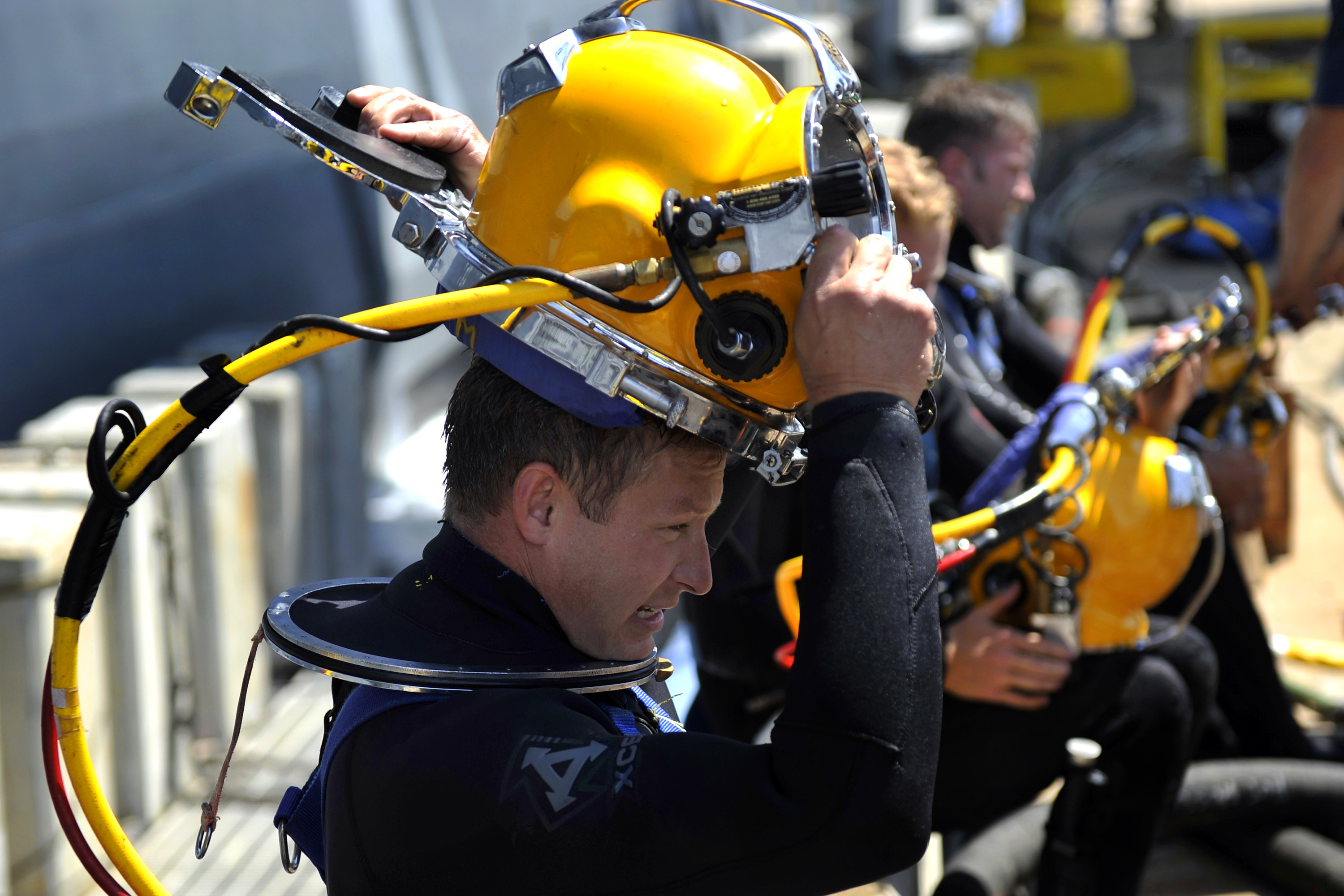
Fitting a lightweight demand helmet

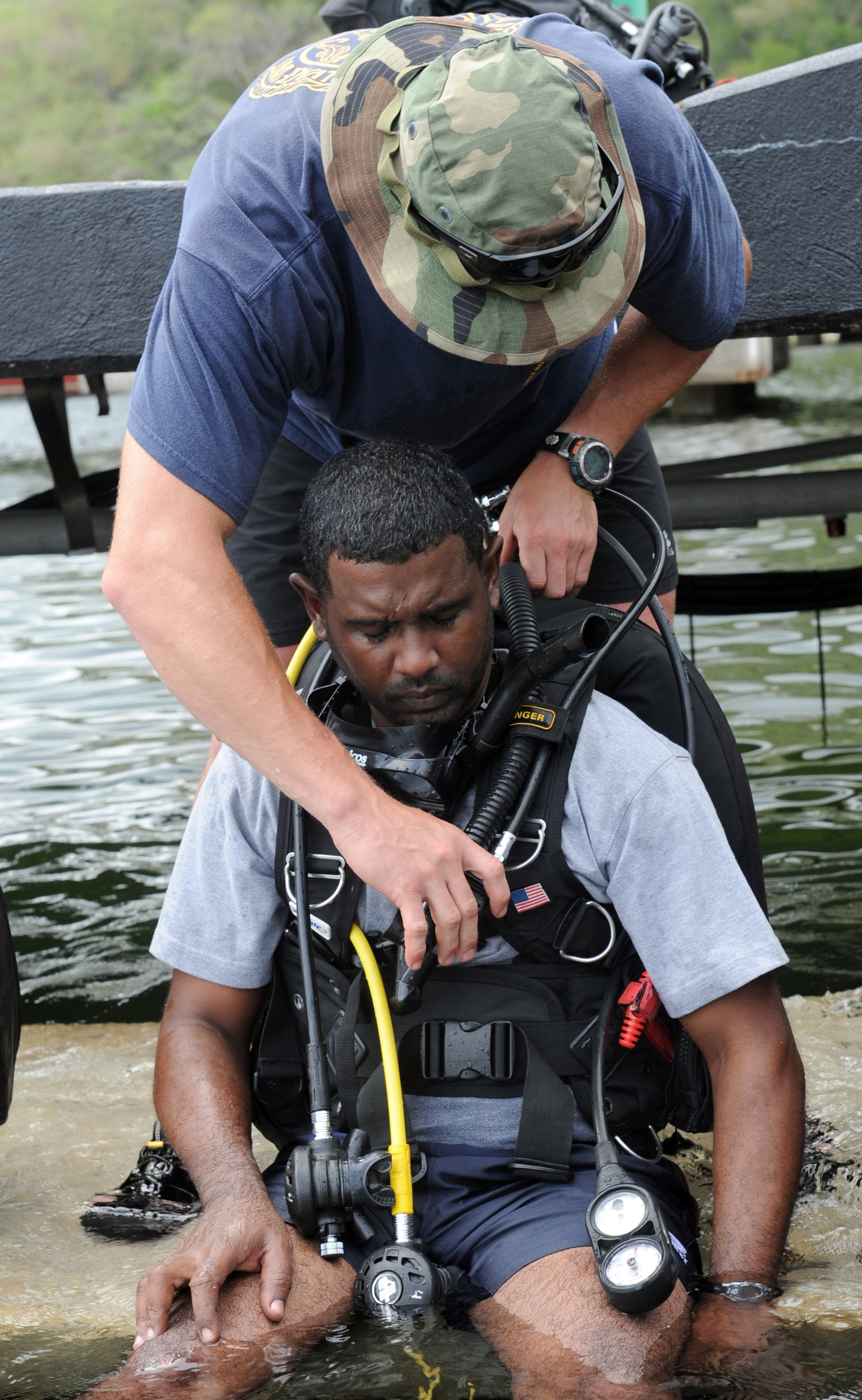
Pre-dive checks

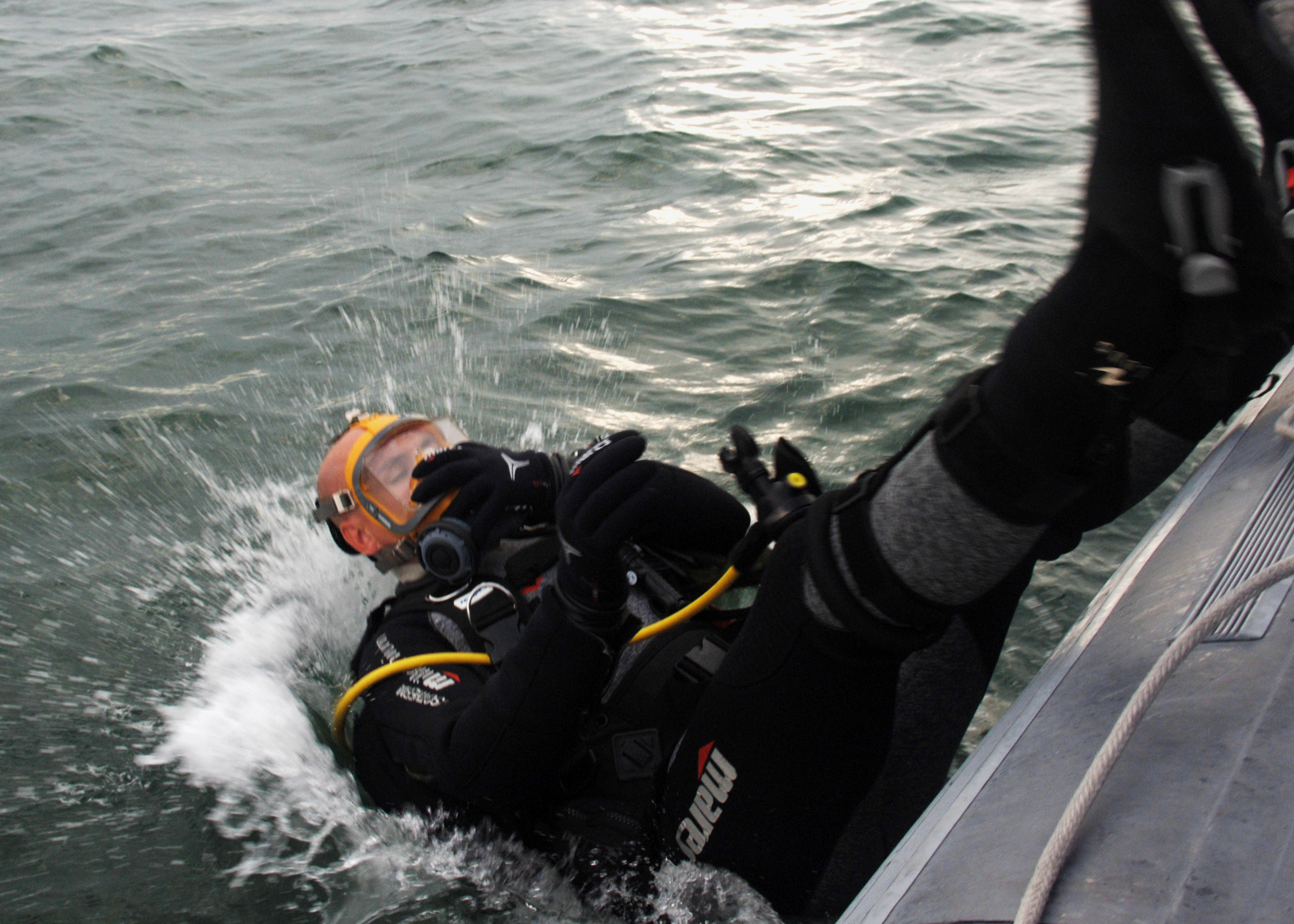
Backward roll entry

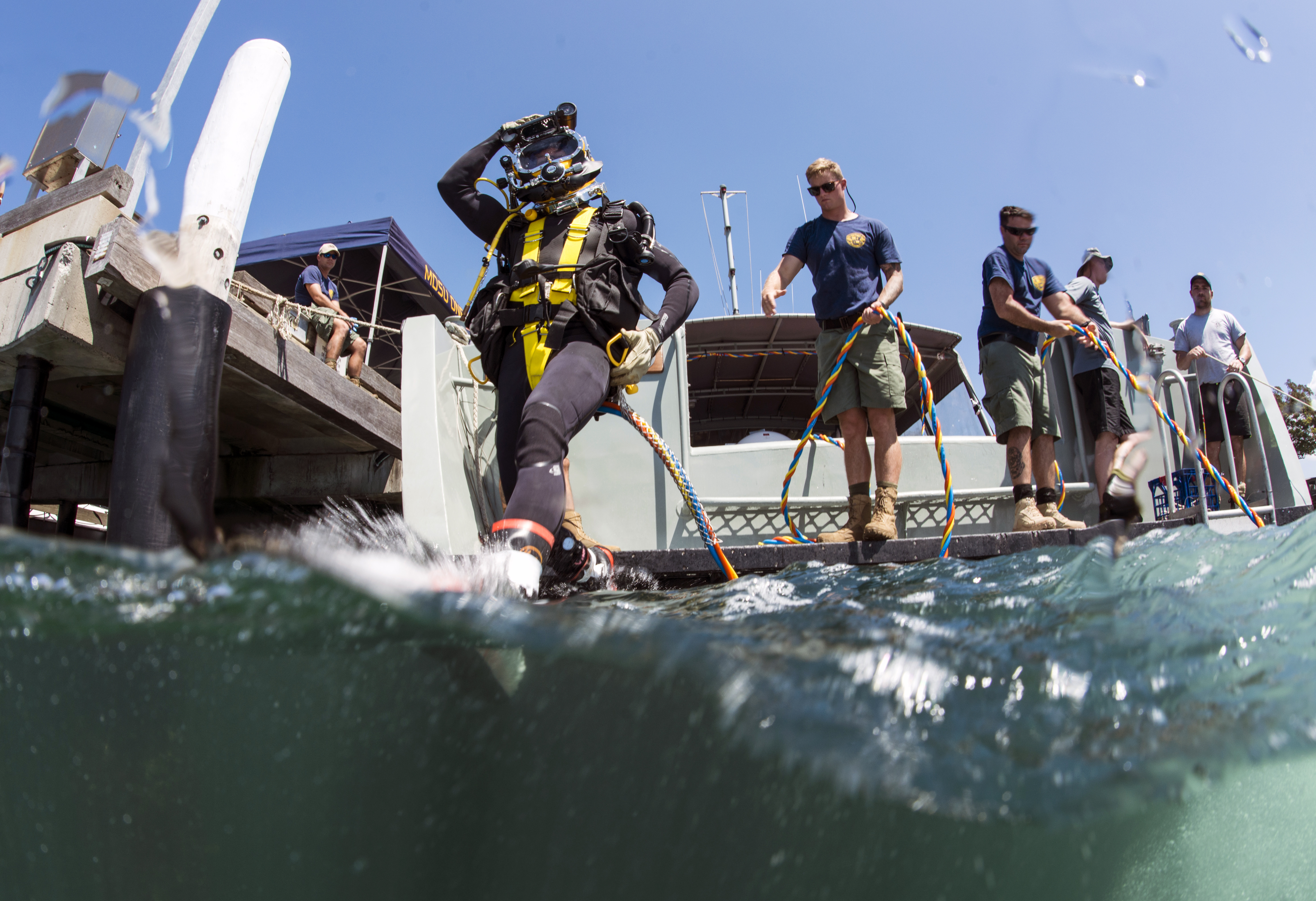
stride entry from a low platform

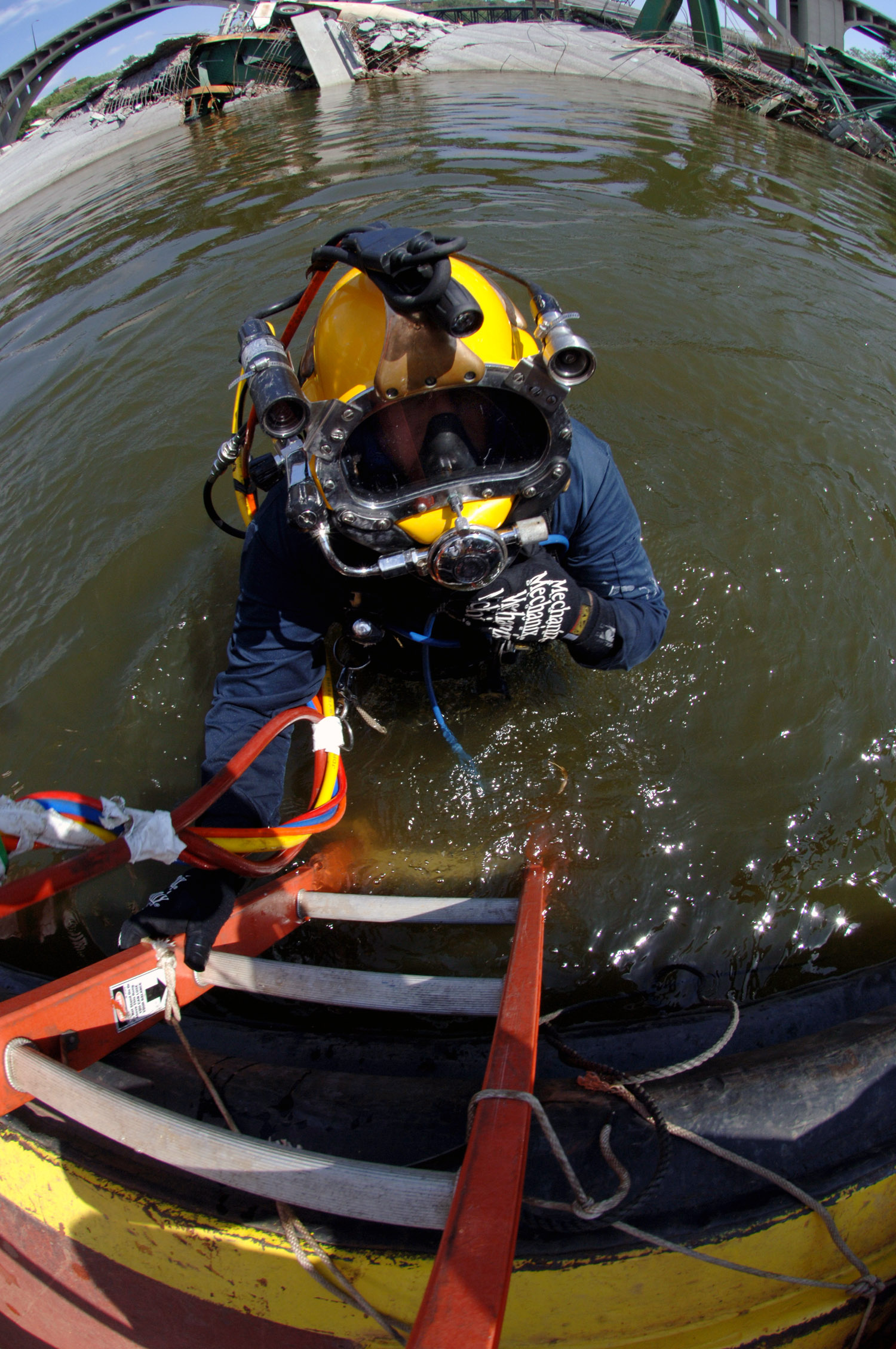
Ladder entry

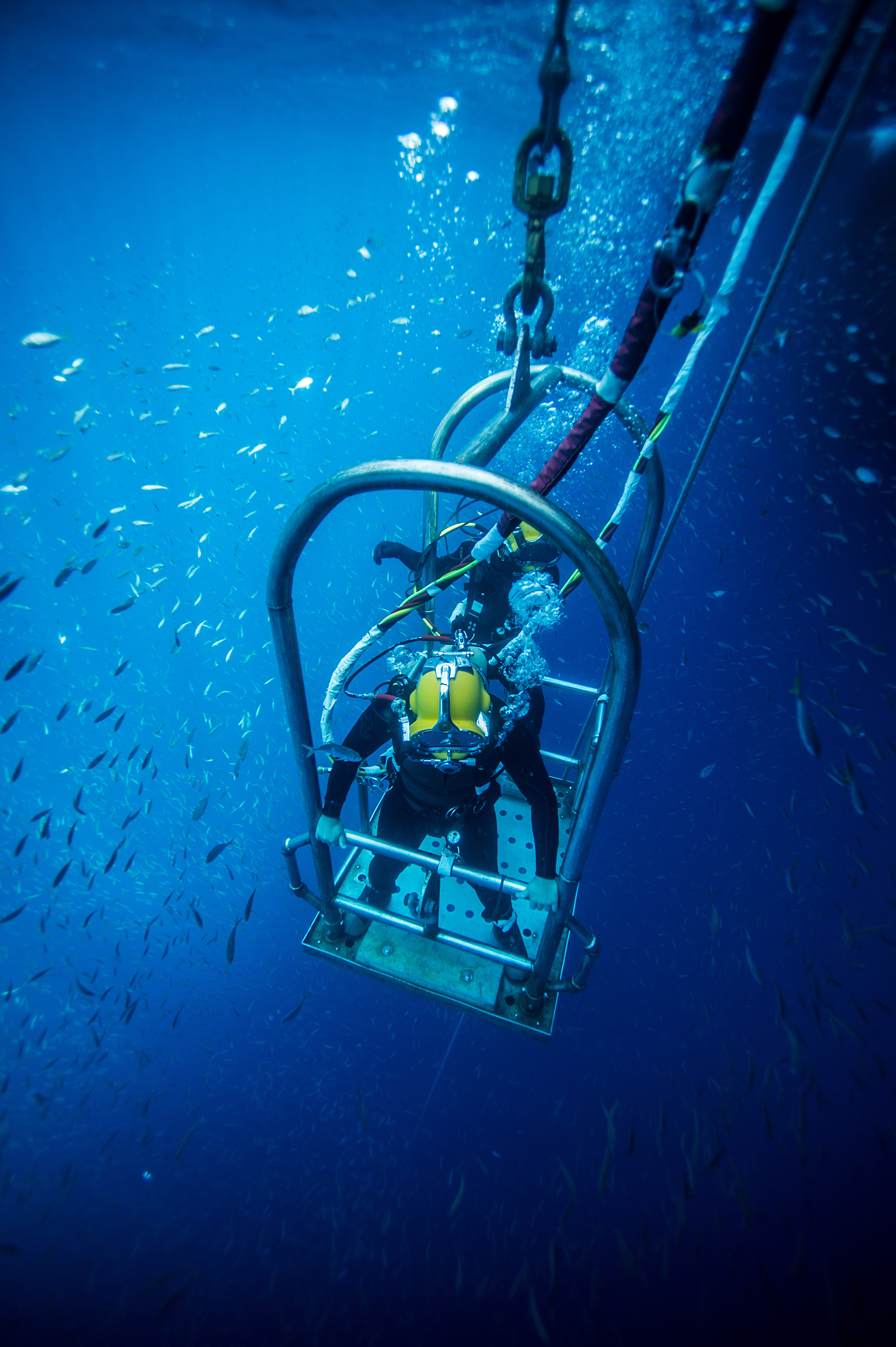
Descent on a diving stage

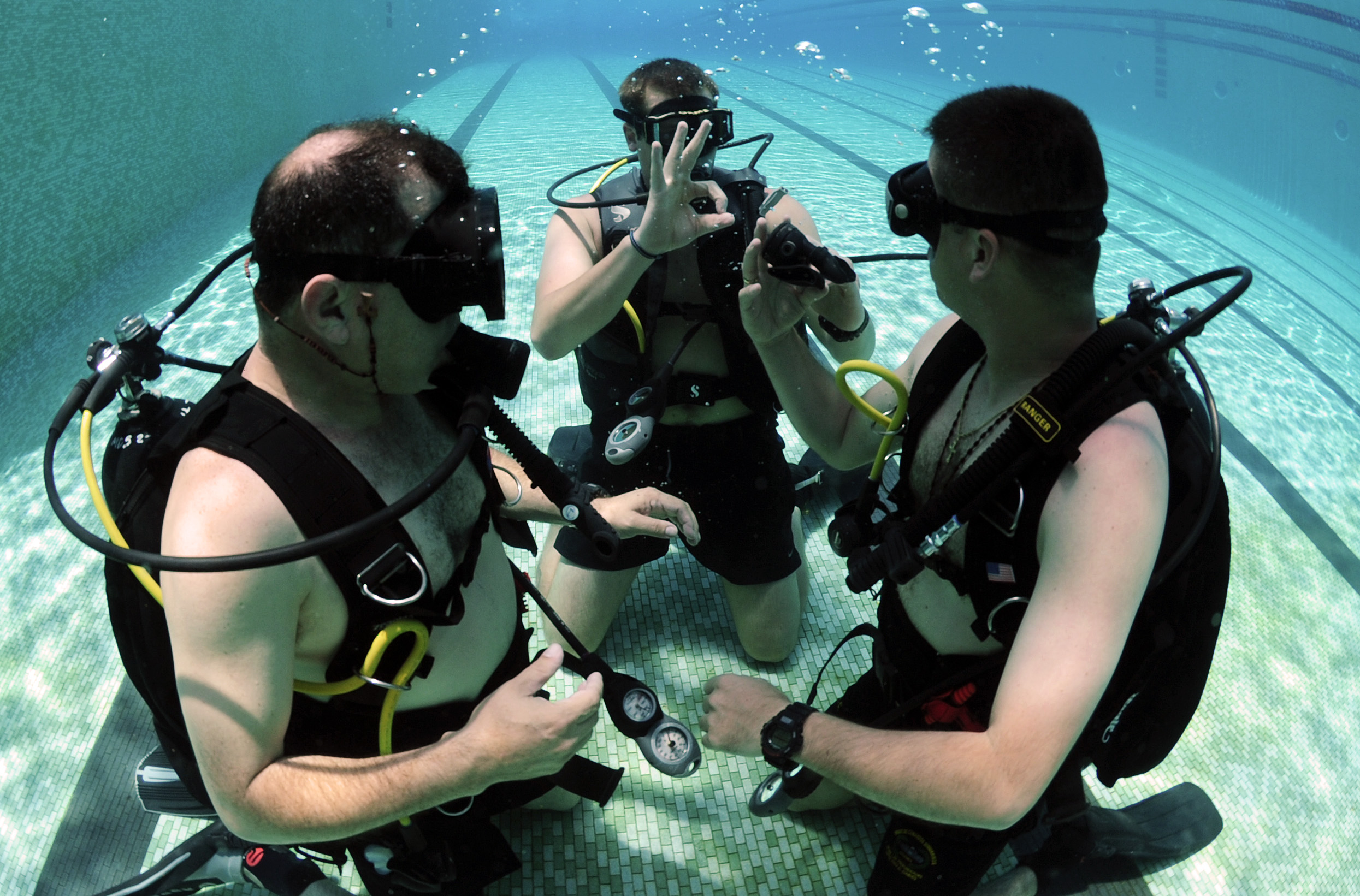
Hand signal communication during a training exercise

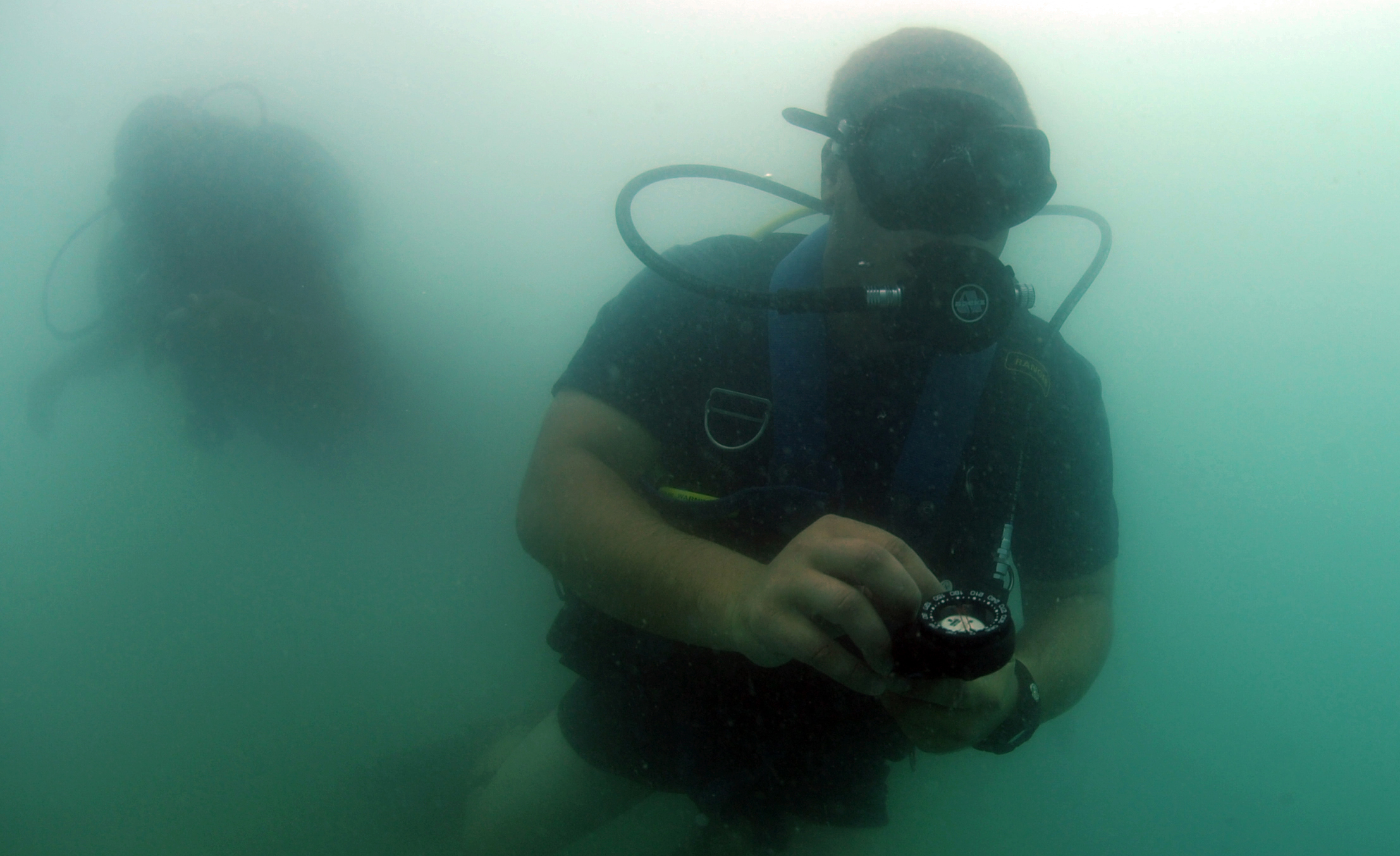
Compass navigation

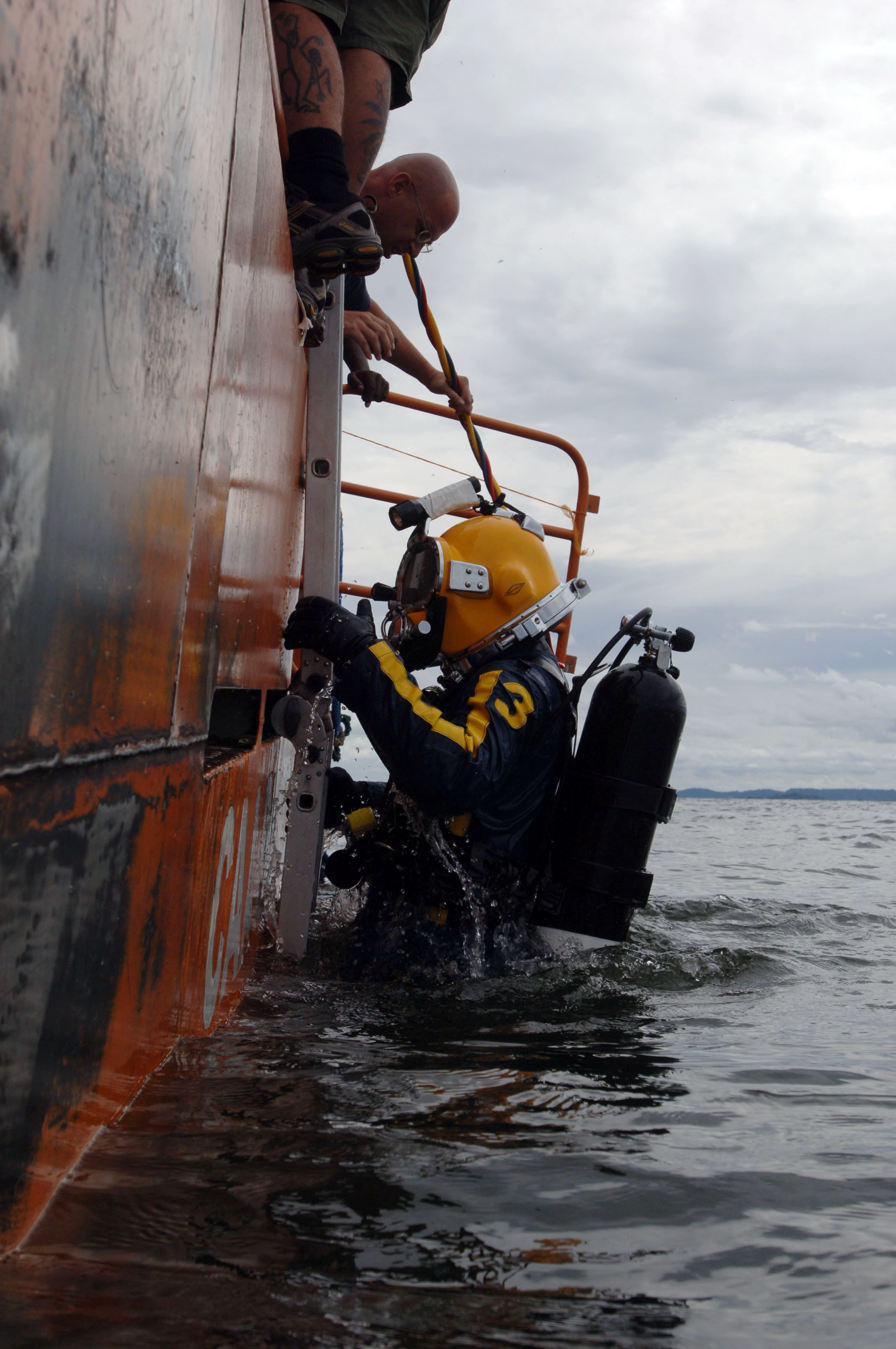
Ladder exit

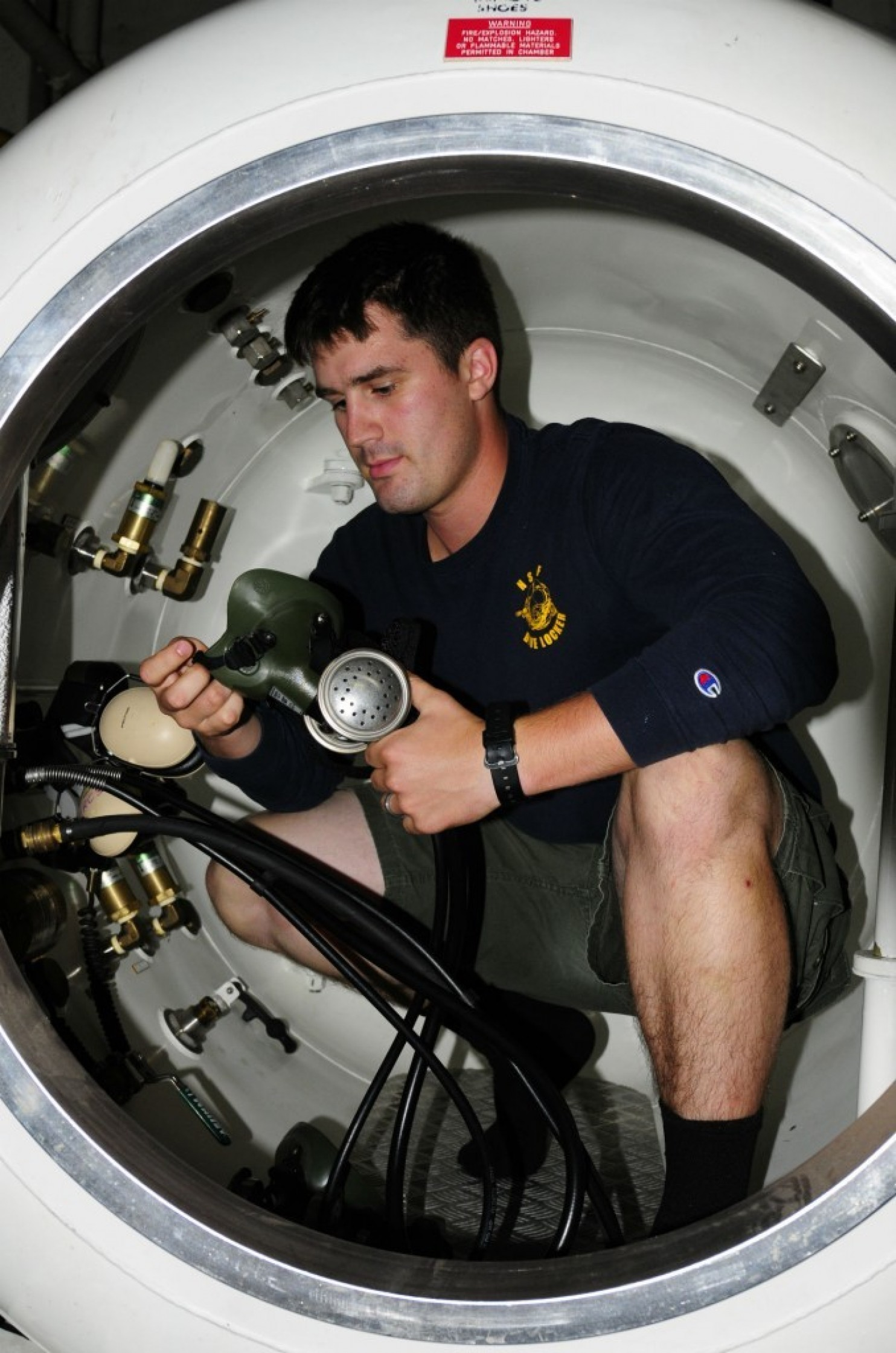
Checking the chamber BIBS

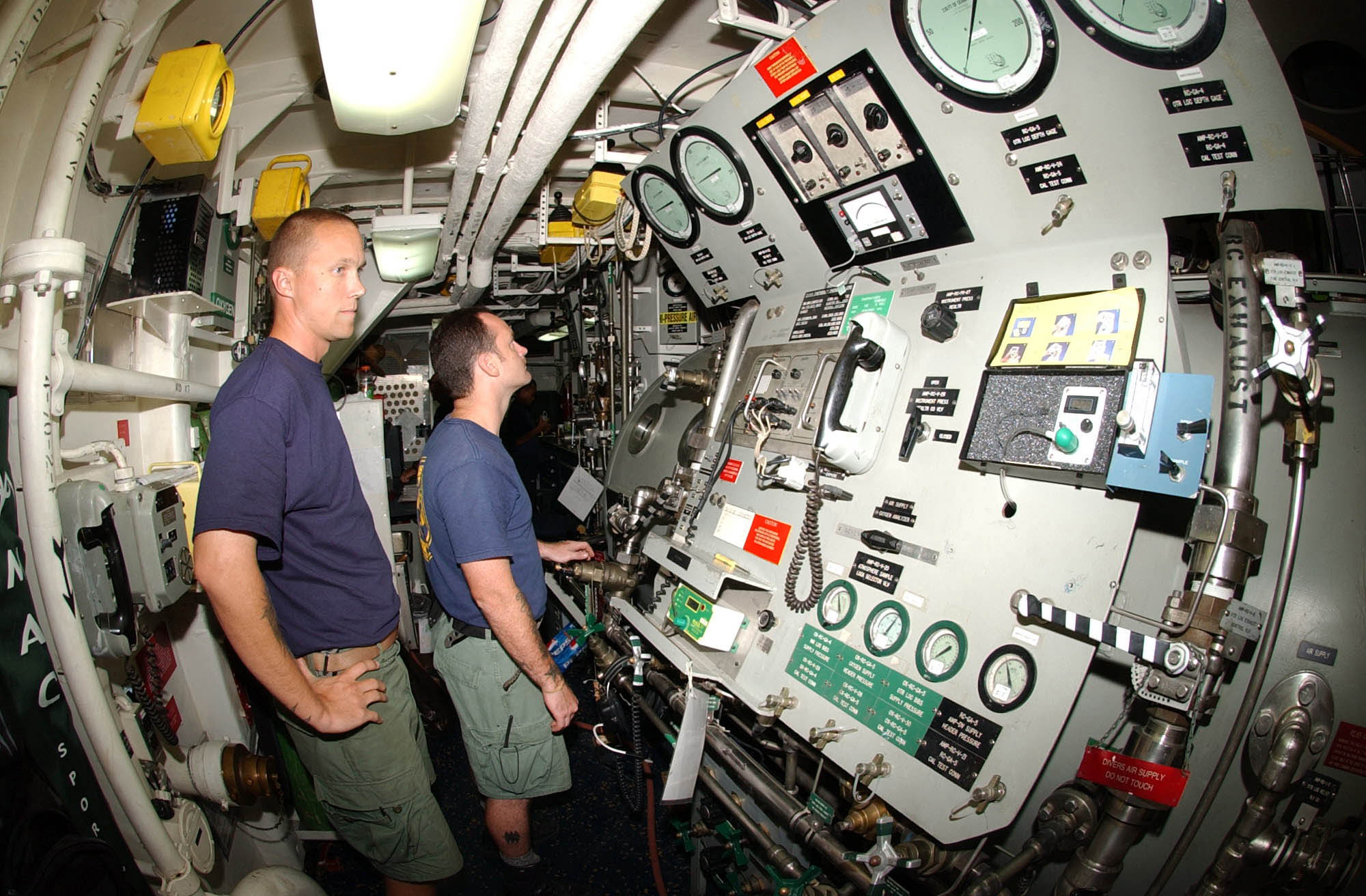
Monitoring the decompression chamber

These are the procedures that the diver uses during the course of a planned dive, where everything goes to plan, and there are no contingencies. Consequently, experienced divers tend to become expert in these procedures due to adequate practice. Some procedures may seldom be needed, or only be relevant to specific equipment, which is not often used, so refresher exercises are frequently required before dives using unfamiliar equipment, or when unusual tasks or unfamiliar conditions are expected.

Dive planning, the pre-dive briefing. and selection, inspection, preparation and pre-dive checking of diving equipment, may be considered diving procedures, as they are essential parts of the normal diving operation, though they are done before entering the water.

In-water procedures in this grouping include entry to the water, surface swimming, descent, buoyancy and trim control, equalisation of pressure in air spaces, maneuvering in midwater and at the bottom, monitoring the dive profile, gas supply and decompression obligations, normal ascent, and exit from the water. For some divers, gas switching, deployment of a decompression buoy and staged decompression may be added, or navigation under an overhead. Communications procedures depend on equipment and mode of diving, but are also in this group.

After-dive maintenance and storage of equipment, debriefing, and logging the dive are also procedural parts of the normal diving operation.

=== Scuba ===
Clearing a flooded demand valve is both a routine procedure and an emergency procedure. It is an emergency procedure because if the DV is not cleared, the diver could aspirate water and choke, but it can easily happen, and will happen when a diver switches to a different gas supply delivered through a different DV, and there are two easy ways to deal with it, so it should not be a problem on a dive which runs according to plan.

Routine scuba diving procedures (order may vary slightly, and some are also relevant to surface supplied diving, though details may vary):

- Dive planning – Process of planning an underwater diving operation.
- Selection of equipment – A diver is expected to be able select appropriate equipment and check it for fit and function.
- Preparation of equipment – Assembly and function checks of personal diving equipment.
  - Scuba assembly – Assembly and function check of the scuba set.
- Site inspection and setup.
- Pre-dive briefing – Meeting of the dive team to discuss details before the diving operation.
- Kit-up/dressing in the diver – Dressing into the diving suit, breathing apparatus, harness and accessories.
  - Pre-dive checks – Check that all necessary equipment is correctly fitted and functioning.
- Entering the water – Use of an appropriate water entry technique.
- Surface checks – Final function checks and reports before descent.
- Breathing from the demand valve – The pattern of breathing can affect work of breathing and effective dead space, both of which must be limited, and preferably minimised. Mouthpieces must seal against the lips when used to prevent aspiration of water.
- Demand valve clearing – Expelling water from the interior of the demand valve.
- Descent – A generally consistent increase in depth until the operational depth is reached.
  - Equalisation – Balancing pressures in air spaces with the ambient pressure.
    - Equalise dry suit squeeze – Injecting sufficient gas into the dry suit for comfort and insulation.
    - Ear clearing – Equalising of pressure in the middle ears.
  - Buoyancy control – Adjustment of the gas content in buoyancy compensator and dry suit to achieve appropriate buoyancy.
  - Trim control – Control of attitude in the water to suit the circumstances.
  - Depth monitoring and control – Observation of current depth and ensuring it is appropriate.
- Standard dive activities:
  - Communications – Methods used by underwater divers to communicate.
  - Mask clearing and demisting – Discharge of water from the mask, and rinsing off condensation from the inner surface.
  - Maneuvering and mobility – Self-propulsion in the water column.
  - Monitoring decompression status – Keeping track of personal decompression obligation.
  - Monitoring breathing gas supply – Ensuring that the remaining gas supply is sufficient to complete the dive safely.
  - Balancing cylinder usage – ensuring that enough gas to safely finish the dive remains if any one cylinder loses all remaining gas.
  - Stage-drops – depositing stage cylinders at predetermined positions or when the pressure reaches a planned level along a route, usually a route marked by a guideline, usually for use on the return sector of the dive.
  - Stage retrieval – retrieving a drop tank on the return stage and using it for the next stage according to plan.
- Rebreather diving – Underwater diving using self contained breathing gas recycling apparatus.
- Use of auxiliary equipment – Useful equipment, not needed on all dives.
  - Towing a surface marker buoy – Buoy towed by a scuba diver to indicate position.
  - Deployment of a decompression buoy – Inflatable surface marker buoy deployed from underwater.
- Planned diving activities – These are mostly considered underwater work, with a few exceptions and borderline cases.
  - Navigation – Underwater navigation by scuba divers – This is generally considered to be a diving skill, not a work skill.
    - Laying, marking, following and retrieving distance lines (guide lines) – Safety critical procedures in an overhead environment.
  - Underwater searches – Techniques for finding underwater targets – In professional diving these may be considered diving procedures or work procedures.
- Ascent – A generally consistent decrease in depth until the surface is reached.
  - Decompression – The reduction in ambient pressure experienced during ascent from depth, and the process of elimination of dissolved inert gases from the diver's body tissues.
  - No-stop diving – Diving which limits tissue inert gas concentrations to those which allow acceptably safe surfacing without decompression stops.
  - Repetitive diving – Diving again while some tissues have not reached equilibrium with surface saturation.
  - Staged decompression – Decompression at fixed depth intervals, a practise which allows use of decompression tables.
    - Gas switching – Changing between breathing gases during a dive to a gas suited to the current depth, to limit oxygen toxicity or nitrogen narcosis, or to accelerate decompression.
    - Management of multiple cylinders – Managing additional cylinders with different gas mixtures.
    - Accelerated decompression – Use of oxygen enriched gas mixtures to accelerate inert gas elimination.
    - Oxygen decompression – Use of pure oxygen to accelerate inert gas elimination.
    - Monitoring decompression using a planned schedule, depth measurement and elapsed time.
    - Monitoring decompression using a dive computer – Instrument to calculate decompression status in real time.
  - Surfacing – The final stage of ascent.
- Return to exit point – Getting from the position of surfacing to a place where the diver can safely exit the water, usually by finning at the surface.
- Exit from water.
- Un-kit (dressing out) – Removal of diving equipment worn and carried by the diver.
- Debriefing – Report back and review on a project or mission after completion.
- Log dive – Recording specific details about the dive in a diver's logbook (paper or electronic database).
- Clean, inspect and store equipment – Basic daily user maintenance.
- Pack up site (demobilise) – The dismantling, packing and transport back to storage of the dive spread.

=== Surface supplied diving ===
Routine Surface-supplied diving procedures:

- Preparing the surface supplied diving equipment.
- Dressing in the diver – Dressing into the diving suit, harness, bailout set, helmet or full-face mask and accessories.
- Pre-dive checks – Checks that all necessary equipment is correctly fitted and functioning.
- Demisting the faceplate – getting rid of condensation droplets on the inner face of the viewport to improve vision.
- Clearing a flooded helmet or full-face mask – Expelling water which found its way into the interior space and can hinder safe breathing.
- Adjusting the breathing resistance – adjusting inhalation and exhalation pressure differences to reduce the work of breathing of a demand regulator.
- Voice communication – Use of standard voice protocols to facilitate accurate and reliable communication.
- Rope signals – Use of standard code of pull signals transmitted via the lifeline or umbilical when voice is not available.
- Umbilical management – Keeping slack, twists, and snags from the route of the umbilical to the diver.
- In-water decompression – Fully decompressing in the water.
- Surface decompression – Leaving the water before fully decompressed and recompressing in a chamber to finish the decompression in relative comfort.

==== Wet bell ====
Routine wet bell procedures (some of these procedures also apply to closed bell operations, though details will differ):

- Preparation of the bell – Preparation of the bell for the dive and testing the bell systems.
- Descent and ascent – Lowering the bell to working depth and raising it at the end of the dive, with appropriate in-water decompression stops.
- Lock-out – Deployment of the diver(s) from the bell at working depth.
- Bell integrity check at the bottom – Brief inspection of the exterior of the bell before the diver leaves the immediate vicinity.
- Monitoring at the bell – Monitoring of the bell and environs and of the working diver's umbilical by the bellman.
- Umbilical management – Management of the diver's umbilical by the bellman.
- Operation of the wet bell gas panel –
- In-water tending – Additional management of the diver's umbilical by an in-water tender where necessary.
- Securing the bell for ascent – Stowing of umbilicals on the bell, checks that the bell is clear to be lifted, and report back to surface that the bell and divers are ready to start the ascent.

==== Closed bell ====
Routine closed bell procedures:

- Locking out of and into the bell – Equalising the interior pressure with the water, opening the lock and entering the water, followed by checking the bell and proceeding to the worksite. Later returning to the bell, exiting the water and closing the lock to achieve a pressure seal.
- Tending the working diver – Management of the working diver's umbilical by the bellman.
- Transfer under pressure – Moving between pressurised vessels without decompression.
- Operation of the closed bell gas panel –
- Saturation decompression – Decompressing back to normal surface pressure after a dive where all tissue compartments have saturated with the inert gas in the breathing mixture.

== Emergency procedures ==
These are the procedures that the diver is expected to be able to follow in the event of a reasonably foreseeable contingency. Some occur quite often such as the loss of grip on the mouthpiece in scuba diving, and are therefore usually well practiced. Others, like bailing out to emergency gas supply, should never happen if the equipment does not fail and the dive is carried out according to a good plan, and must be practiced as an exercise to maintain the skill or as part of pre-dive checks to ensure that the equipment is functioning correctly, as failure to perform correctly could be fatal.

Emergency procedures are procedures to recover from a contingency that could be life-threatening if not responded to promptly and correctly. Some are trivially easy for a skilled diver. They include regulator recovery, clearing a flooded mask or helmet, bailout to emergency gas supply, emergency swimming ascent (for scuba), bell abandonment, shedding of weights (scuba), breathing off the pneumofathometer hose (SSDE), and switching over to onboard gas (bell diving). In cave or wreck diving, finding a lost guideline and finding the other part of a broken line are also emergency procedures.

=== Scuba emergency procedures ===
- Regulator clearing – Removal of water from the interior of the demand valve mouthpiece.
- Vomiting through the demand valve – Clearing and flushing the demand valve after vomiting underwater.
- Regulator recovery – Finding a dislodged demand valve and returning it to the mouth.
- Stop freeflow – Correcting a demand valve malfunction that provides a constant high gas flow.
- Bailout – Switching to emergency breathing gas supply.
  - Bailout to open circuit – Switching to open circuit scuba emergency gas supply.
  - Bailout to closed circuit rebreather – Switching to an emergency rebreather gas supply.
  - Request gas sharing from dive buddy – Request emergency gas sharing from another diver.
- Switch and isolate regulator in case of freeze – Close off a frozen regulator and switch to an alternative gas supply.
- Stop and correct runaway dry suit inflation.
- Stop and correct runaway buoyancy compensator inflation.
- Manage dry suit flooding – Manage buoyancy and insulation loss due to flooding of the dry suit.
- Recovery from accidental inversion in dry suit – Avoid uncontrolled ascent following unintended flow of gas to the feet of a dry suit.
- Follow guideline in silt-out – Avoid getting lost under an overhead.
- Find lost guideline – Avoid getting lost under an overhead.
- Cross break in guideline – Find the guideline on the other side of a break to avoid getting lost under an overhead.
- Emergency ascents – Procedures for reaching the surface in various emergencies.
  - Lost mask ascent – Ascent when the diver's vision is impaired by not having a mask.
  - Lost buoyancy ascent – Ascent when the diver's buoyancy is compromised.
  - Omitted decompression procedure – Procedures for managing a failure to decompress sufficiently.
  - Assisted ascents – Ascents where the diver in distress is assisted by another diver.
    - Buddy breathing ascent – Where the divers share gas supplied by one diver using the same demand valve in turns.
    - Buddy assisted ascent – Where the divers share gas supplied by one diver using two demand valves.
    - Lifeline assisted ascent – Where the diver is pulled up by the line attendant.
  - Independent emergency ascents – Where the diver takes independent action and has no assistance.
    - Ascent while breathing from the buoyancy compensator – Use of the gas in the buoyancy compensator to facilitate an emergency ascent where no other gas is available to breathe.
    - Buoyant ascent – Using positive buoyancy to rise to the surface.
      - Lost weights ascent with flare – Mitigation of an incident where the diver cannot neutralise positive buoyancy.
      - Controlled buoyant emergency ascent – Fine control of buoyancy to ascend at an acceptably safe rate.
      - Tethered buoyant emergency ascent – Ascent with positive buoyancy and depth controlled by a reel line attached to the bottom.
    - Emergency swimming ascents – Emergency ascent where the diver actively swims upward at approximately neutral buoyancy.
      - Free ascent – Ascent where the diver has no source of breathing gas available.
      - Controlled emergency swimming ascent – Ascent where there may be a small amount of breathing gas which becomes available due to ambient pressure reduction.
- Cut free from entanglement.
- Ditch weights to establish buoyancy – Removal of some or all ballast weights to establish neutral or positive buoyancy underwater, or to establish positive buoyancy at the surface.
- Standardised emergency procedures used with manifolded twin scuba cylinders – Closing the isolation valve, or closing the left or right cylinder valves to identify and isolate a malfunction, and opening the valves as appropriate to make best use of remaining gas, and switching demand valves as required.
- Therapeutic recompression – The use of recompression to treat symptomatic decompression illness.
  - In-water recompression – Recompression underwater to treat decompression illness or to compensate for omitted decompression.

=== Surface-supplied diving emergency procedures ===
Surface supplied diving emergency procedures:

- Mask or helmet clearing – expelling water from the interior of a helmet or full-face mask.
- Bailout to scuba – Switching to scuba emergency gas supply.
- Bailout to pneumo hose – Using the pneumofathometer hose as an emergency gas supply.
- Switch to bell onboard gas – Switch to emergency on-board gas supply in case of surface supply failure or contamination.
- Abandon wet bell – Surface from wet bell which cannot be raised.
- Respond to heating water malfunction – Manage thermal imbalance due to inappropriate heating water temperature.
- Respond to dry suit flood – Manage insulation and buoyancy loss due to flooded dry suit.
- Respond to suit blowup – Prevent uncontrolled buoyant ascent.
- Respond to buoyancy compensator blowup – Prevent uncontrolled buoyant ascent.
- Respond to voice communications failure – Revert to rope signals. The dive may be terminated.
- Free a snagged umbilical – This could prevent the diver from surfacing.
- Manage vomiting in the helmet – Clear a helmet or full-face mask after vomiting inside it before breathing from the demand valve.
- Manage a broken faceplate – Unrestricted flooding of the helmet is a life-threatening emergency. The dive will be terminated. Flooding can be minimised by positioning the leak as low as possible and opening the free-flow valve.

==== Wet bell emergency procedures ====
- Dynamic positioning alarm and runout response – Dynamic positioning failure puts the divers at risk of being dragged by their umbilicals without warning, with a risk of snagging and rupture. They will return to the bell as a matter of urgency. The bellman will take up slack to help avoid snagging.
- Bell gas panel operation – The bell gas panel is used to switch to on-board gas supply if the surface supply is compromised.
- Bell abandonment – Surfacing from a disabled wet bell.
- Surface gas supply failure – Switch over to on board gas supply by bellman in the event of a surface gas supply failure.
- Voice communications failure.
- Light and gas signals for surface supplied dives.
- Contaminated surface gas supply – Switch over to on board gas supply by bellman in the event of suspected contamination of the surface gas supply.

==== Closed bell emergency procedures ====
- Bell umbilical failure – Switch over to onboard gas supply, emergency signals and prepare to surface.
- Dynamic positioning alarm and runout response – Divers return to the bell and prepare for immediate ascent.
- Main lifting wire/winch failure – Alternative lifting possibilities include the clump weight winch, other hoisting equipment on the platform, and if rated for lifting, the bell umbilical. Through-water transfer at depth to another bell may be possible.
- Loss of bell internal pressure – Response depends on where the bell is at the time, and may include deployment of a second bell to rescue the divers.

== Rescue procedures ==
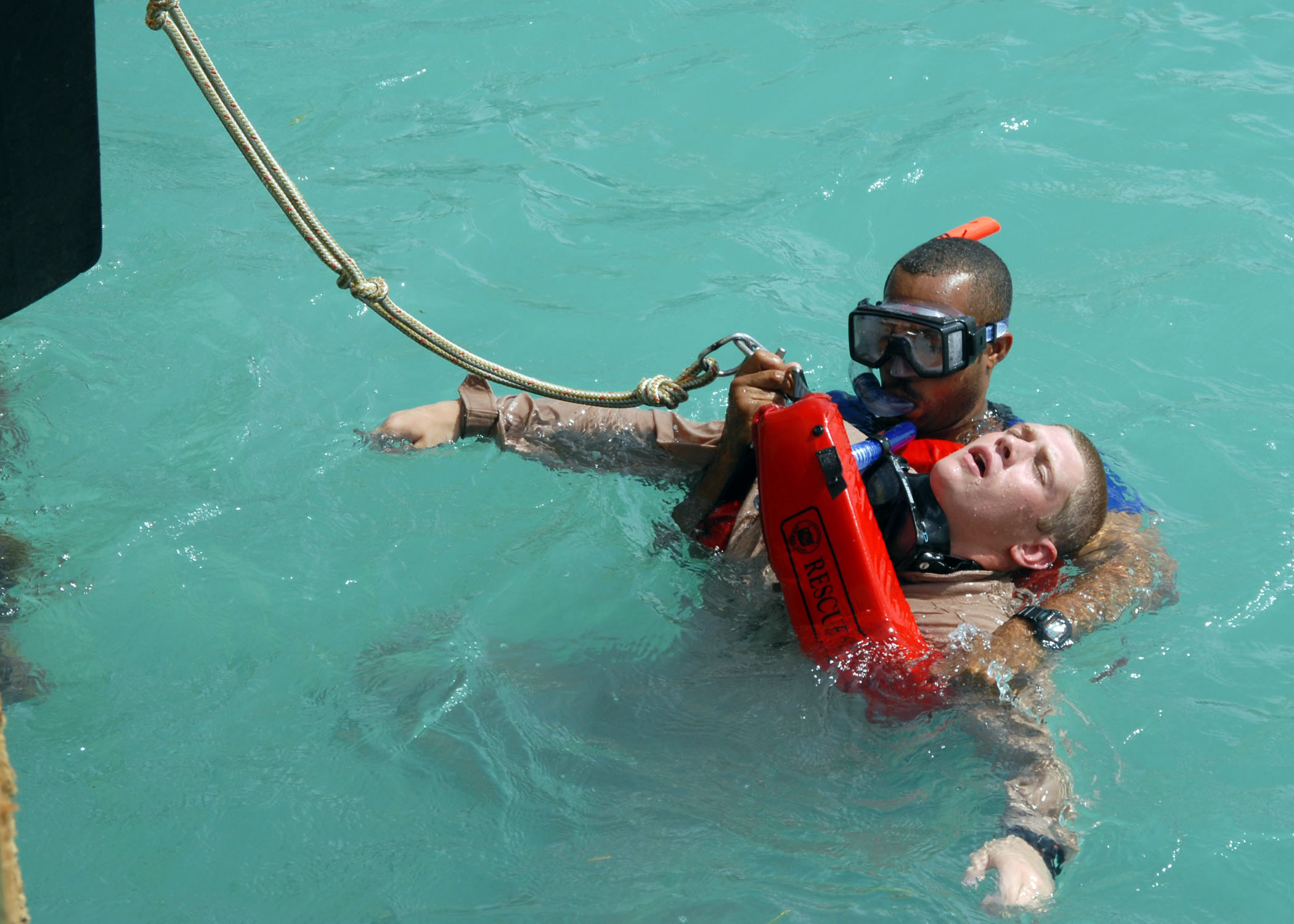
Simulated rescue of an unconscious diver

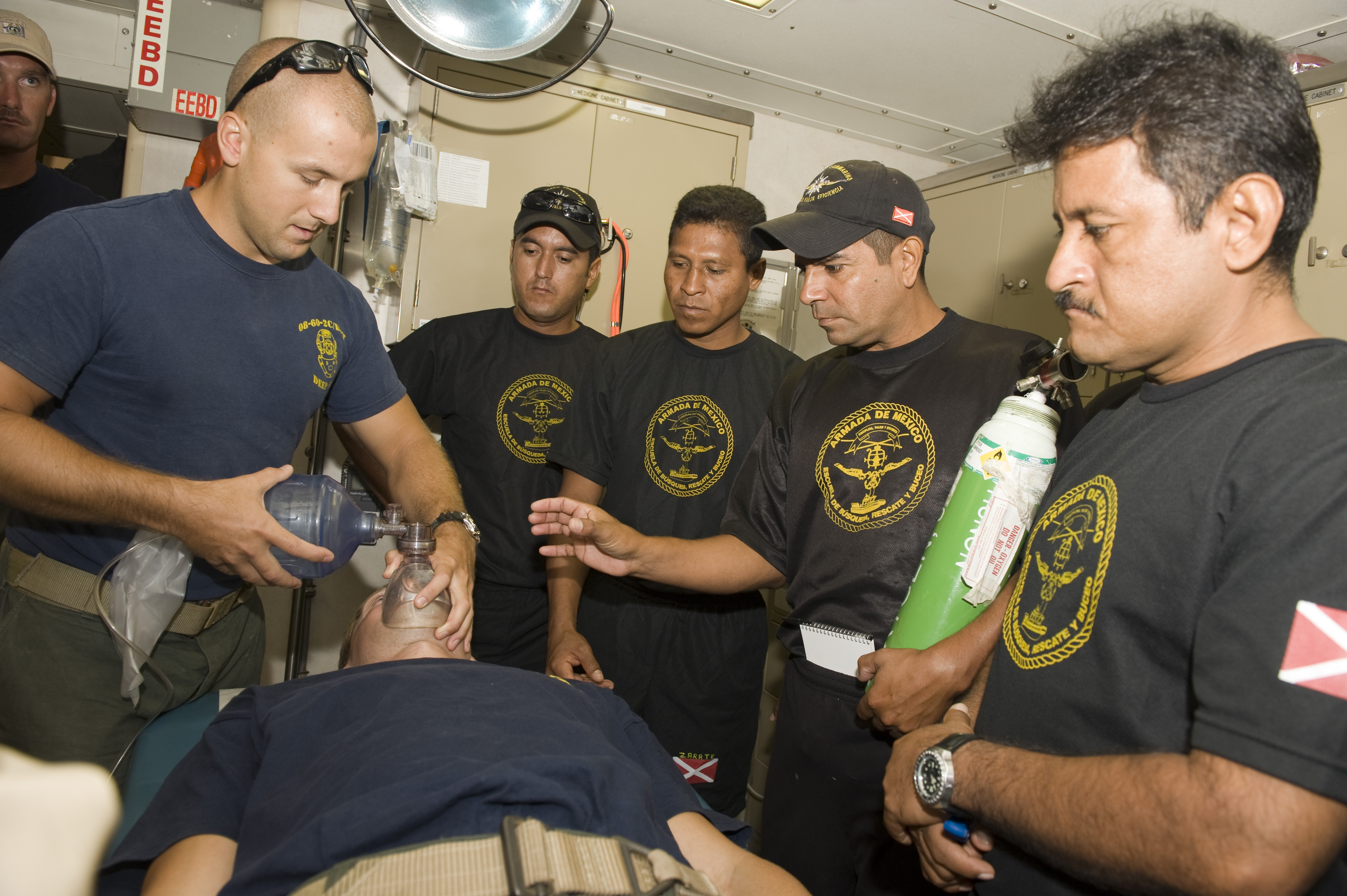
Demonstration of oxygen administration for diver first aid

These are procedures that the professional standby diver must execute when deployed to go to the assistance of the working diver in an emergency, or the buddy or dive-team member in a recreational or technical dive should use if another member of the team is unable to manage an emergency themselves. They are also emergency procedures, but for another person's benefit. It is fairly common for a diver never to need to apply one of these procedures for real, and they too should be practiced to maintain skill levels. Professional diving organisations typically require periodical emergency exercises as specified in their operations manual to maintain these skills.

Rescue procedures include following the umbilical or lifeline to the distressed diver, providing emergency breathing gas, recovering the casualty to the bell or surface, releasing a snagged umbilical, umbilical changeout at depth, providing the supervisor with continuous updates. Rescues may be needed in unexpected circumstances, and seldom follow the text-book example, so the rescue diver may have to modify the learned response to suit reality.

=== Scuba rescue procedures ===
Scuba diving rescue procedures:

- Locating the casualty underwater – Searching for the disabled diver.
- Providing emergency gas – Providing emergency breathing gas to another scuba diver.
- Freeing the trapped casualty – Assisting an entrapped or snagged diver to get free.
- Managing a convulsing casualty – Recovering a diver who is convulsing underwater to the surface.
- Bringing the casualty to the surface – Getting the diver to a place where first aid is possible.
- Controlled buoyant lift – Lifting an incapacitated diver to the surface.
- Making the casualty buoyant on the surface – Ensuring that the diver does not sink before they can be removed from the water.
- Carrying out artificial ventilation in the water –
- Towing the casualty – Getting the casualty to a place where they can be taken out of the water.

=== Surface-supplied diver rescue procedures ===
- Assisting a trapped diver – The diver may be unable to release themself from the entrapment.
- Umbilical changeout – Swapping a problematic umbilical for a replacement under water.
- Rescue of the working diver – Getting the disabled working diver to a place of relative safety.
  - Rescue of an incapacitated diver – Getting the diver to the surface.
  - Rescue of an unconscious diver – Getting an unconscious surface supplied diver to the surface.
  - Recovery of diver to the bell – Getting an incapacitated diver back to the bell where a relatively secure breathing gas supply is available and some first aid is possible, and the first stage of recovery to the surface.
- Rescue of divers from a disabled closed bell – Through-water transfer to another closed bell.
- Lost bell procedures – Locating and lifting a closed bell when the lifting cables and umbilical have been severed.

== See also ==
- Buddy diving – Practice of mutual monitoring and assistance between two divers
- Code of practice – Set of rules regarding behavior of people working in a particular occupation
- Diver training – Processes to develop the skills and knowledge to dive safely underwater
- Diver training standard – Document describing requirements of a diver training programme
- Diving safety – Risk management of underwater diving activities
- Scuba skills – Skills required to scuba-dive safely
- Standard operating procedure – Set of detailed instructions to assist in workplace safety
- Surface-supplied diving skills – Underwater diving procedures
