= Diving hazards =

Agents and situations that pose a threat to the underwater diver

Diving hazards are the agents or situations that pose a threat to the underwater diver or their equipment. Divers operate in an environment for which the human body is not well suited. They face special physical and health risks when they go underwater or use high pressure breathing gas. The consequences of diving incidents range from merely annoying to rapidly fatal, and the result often depends on the equipment, skill, response and fitness of the diver and diving team. The classes of hazards include the aquatic environment, the use of breathing equipment in an underwater environment, exposure to a pressurised environment and pressure changes, particularly pressure changes during descent and ascent, and breathing gases at high ambient pressure. Diving equipment other than breathing apparatus is usually reliable, but has been known to fail, and loss of buoyancy control or thermal protection can be a major burden which may lead to more serious problems. There are also hazards of the specific diving environment, and hazards related to access to and egress from the water, which vary from place to place, and may also vary with time. Hazards inherent in the diver include pre-existing physiological and psychological conditions and the personal behaviour and competence of the individual. For those pursuing other activities while diving, there are additional hazards of task loading, of the dive task and of special equipment associated with the task.

The presence of a combination of several hazards simultaneously is common in diving, and the effect is generally increased risk to the diver, particularly where the occurrence of an incident due to one hazard triggers other hazards with a resulting cascade of incidents. Many diving fatalities are the result of a cascade of incidents overwhelming the diver, who should be able to manage any single reasonably foreseeable incident.

Although there are many dangers involved in diving, divers can decrease the risks through effective procedures and appropriate equipment. The requisite skills are acquired by training and education, and honed by practice. Entry level recreational diving certification programmes highlight diving physiology, safe diving practices, and diving hazards, but do not provide the diver with sufficient practice to become truly adept. Professional diver training provides more practice, but continued experience and practice of essential skills is necessary to develop reliable response to contingencies.

== Changes in pressure ==
Divers must avoid injuries caused by changes in pressure. The weight of the water column above the diver causes an increase in pressure in proportion to depth, in the same way that the weight of the column of atmospheric air above the surface causes a pressure of 101.3 kPa (14.7 pounds-force per square inch) at sea level. This variation of pressure with depth will cause compressible materials and gas filled spaces to tend to change volume, which can cause the surrounding material or tissues to be stressed, with the risk of injury if the stress gets too high. Pressure injuries are called barotrauma and can be quite painful or debilitating, even potentially fatal – in severe cases causing a ruptured lung, eardrum or damage to the sinuses. To avoid barotrauma, the diver equalises the pressure in all air spaces with the surrounding water pressure when changing depth. The middle ear and sinus are equalised using one or more of several techniques, which is referred to as clearing the ears.

The scuba mask (half-mask) is equalised during descent by periodically exhaling through the nose. During ascent it will automatically equalise by leaking excess air round the edges. A helmet or full face mask will automatically equalise as any pressure differential will either vent through the exhaust valve or open the demand valve and release breathing gas for into the low-pressure space. An insufficient gas supply for the descent rate can lead to helmet squeeze. This was more of a problem with manual air pumps, and often associated with a fall off the edge of a relatively high place by a diver in standard diving equipment with a lot of slack in the lifeline. Another barotrauma hazard is helmet squeeze caused by a shallow rupture of the surface-supplied breathing gas hose and simultaneous failure of the non-return valve at the helmet, which can cause a large pressure difference between the helmet interior and the rupture.

If a dry suit is worn, it must be equalised by inflation and deflation, much like a buoyancy compensator. Most dry suits are fitted with an auto-dump valve, which, if set correctly, and kept at the high point of the diver by good trim skills, will automatically release gas as it expands and retain a virtually constant volume during ascent. During descent the dry suit must be inflated manually unless sealed to the helmet.

== Effects of breathing high-pressure gas ==
Breathing high-pressure gas constitutes a hazard with associated risks of decompression sickness, nitrogen narcosis, oxygen toxicity and high-pressure nervous syndrome.

=== Decompression sickness ===
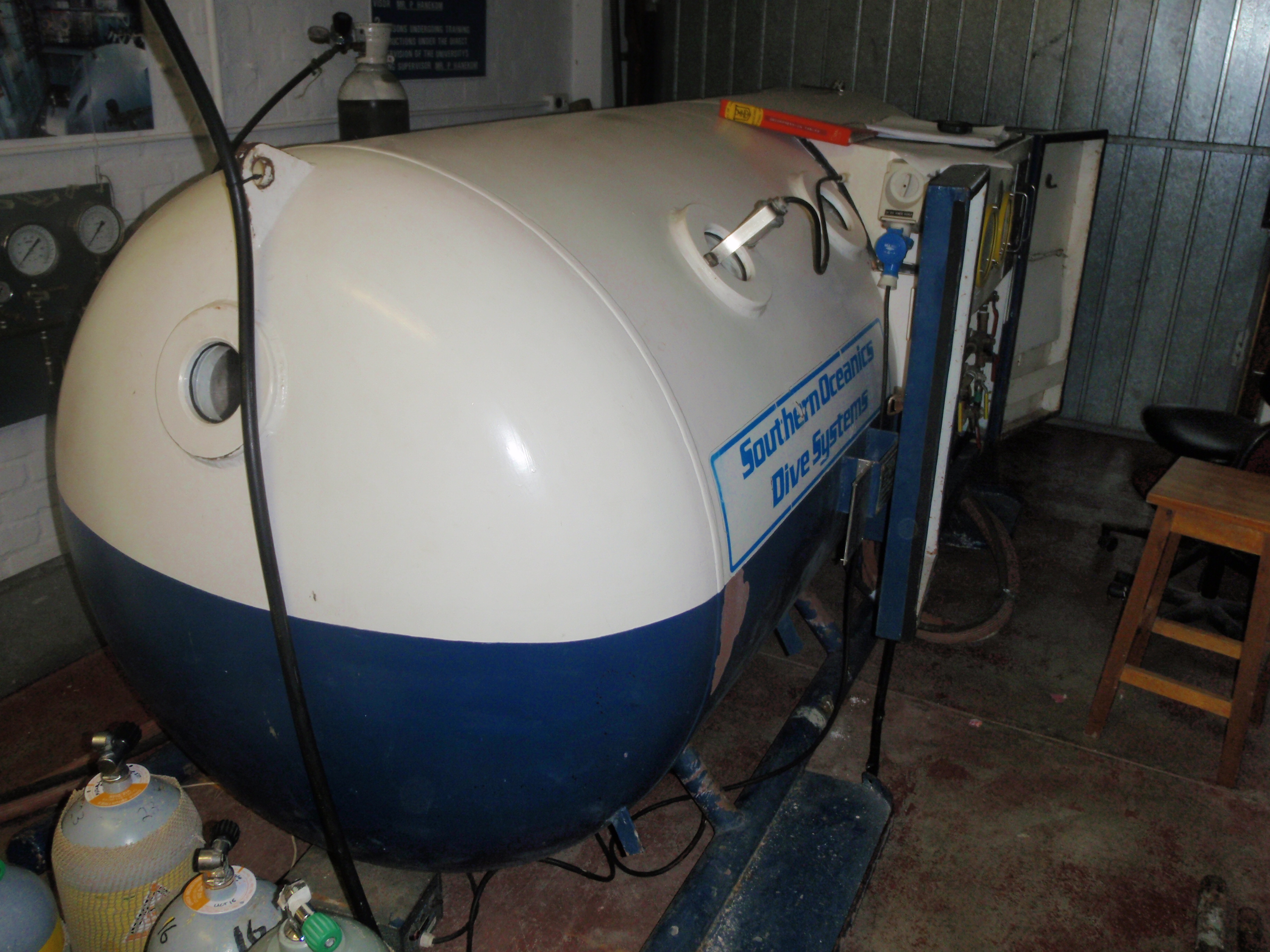
Exterior of a deck decompression chamber

The prolonged exposure to breathing gases at high partial pressure will result in increased amounts of non-metabolic gases, usually nitrogen and/or helium, (referred to in this context as inert gases) dissolving in the bloodstream as it passes through the alveolar capillaries, and thence carried to the other tissues of the body, where they will accumulate until saturated. This saturation process has very little immediate effect on the diver. However, when the pressure is reduced during ascent, the amount of dissolved inert gas that can be held in stable solution in the tissues is reduced. This effect is described by Henry's Law.

As a consequence of the reducing partial pressure of inert gases in the lungs during ascent, the dissolved gas will be diffused back from the bloodstream to the gas in the lungs and exhaled. The reduced gas concentration in the blood has a similar effect when it passes through tissues carrying a higher concentration, and that gas will diffuse back into the bloodstream, reducing the loading of the tissues. As long as this process is gradual, the tissue gas loading in the diver will reduce by diffusion and perfusion until it eventually re-stabilises at the current saturation pressure. The problem arises when the pressure is reduced more quickly than the gas can be removed by this mechanism, and the level of supersaturation rises sufficiently to become unstable. At this point, bubbles may form and grow in the tissues, and may cause damage either by distending the tissue locally, or blocking small blood vessels, shutting off blood supply to the downstream side, and resulting in hypoxia of those tissues.

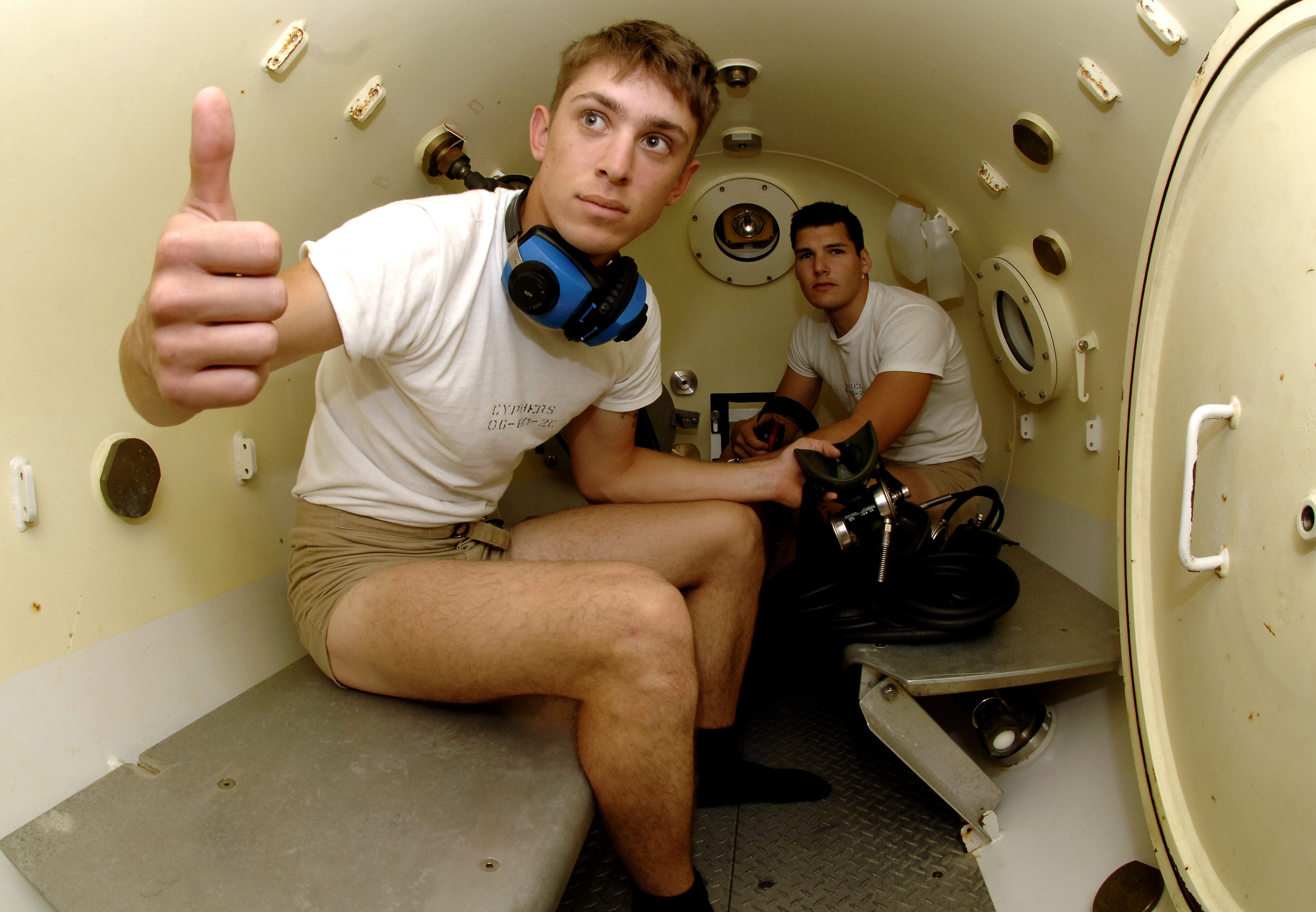
Divers inside a recompression chamber

This effect is called decompression sickness or 'the bends', and must be avoided by reducing the pressure on the body slowly while ascending and allowing the inert gases dissolved in the tissues to be eliminated while still in solution. This process is known as "off-gassing", and is done by restricting the ascent (decompression) rate to one where the level of supersaturation is not sufficient for bubbles to form or grow. This level is only known statistically, and may vary for reasons which are not well understood. The level of supersaturation limited by controlling the speed of ascent and making periodic stops to allow gases to be eliminated by respiration. The procedure of making stops is called staged decompression, and the stops are called decompression stops. Decompression stops that are not computed as strictly necessary are called safety stops, and reduce the risk of bubble formation further at the cost of a longer ascent time, greater gas consumption and in many cases greater exposure to other hazards. Dive computers or decompression tables are used to determine a relatively safe ascent profile, but are not completely reliable. There remains a statistical possibility of decompression bubbles forming even when the guidance from tables or computer has been followed exactly.

=== Nitrogen narcosis ===
Nitrogen narcosis or inert gas narcosis is a reversible alteration in consciousness producing a state similar to alcohol intoxication in divers who breathe high-pressure gas containing nitrogen or other potentially narcotic gas at raised partial pressures. The mechanism is similar to that of nitrous oxide, or "laughing gas," administered as anaesthesia. Being "narced" can impair judgement and make diving considerably more dangerous. Narcosis starts to affect some divers at about 66 feet (20 m) on air. At this depth, narcosis often manifests itself as a slight giddiness. The effects increase with an increase in depth. Almost all divers will notice the effects by 132 feet (40 m). At this depth divers may feel euphoria, anxiety, loss of coordination and/or lack of concentration. At extreme depths, a hallucinogenic reaction, tunnel vision or unconsciousness can occur. Jacques Cousteau famously described it as the "rapture of the deep". Nitrogen narcosis occurs quickly and the symptoms typically disappear equally quickly during the ascent, so that divers often fail to realise they were ever affected. It affects individual divers at varying depths and conditions, and can even vary from dive to dive under identical conditions. Diving with trimix or heliox reduces the effects, which are proportional to the partial pressure of nitrogen, and probably oxygen, in the breathing gas.

=== Oxygen toxicity ===
Oxygen toxicity occurs when the tissues are exposed to an excessive combination of partial pressure (PPO_{2}) and duration. In acute cases it affects the central nervous system and causes a seizure, which can result in the diver losing consciousness, spitting out their regulator and drowning. While the exact limit is not reliably predictable, and is affected by carbon dioxide levels, it is generally recognised that central nervous system oxygen toxicity is preventable if one does not exceed an oxygen partial pressure of 1.4 bar. For deep dives – generally past 180 feet (55 m), divers use "hypoxic blends" containing a lower percentage of oxygen than atmospheric air. A less immediately threatening form known as pulmonary oxygen toxicity occurs after exposures to lower oxygen partial pressures for much longer periods than generally encountered in scuba diving, but is a recognised problem in saturation diving.

=== High-pressure nervous syndrome ===
High-pressure nervous syndrome (HPNS – also known as high-pressure neurological syndrome) is a neurological and physiological diving disorder that results when a diver descends below about 500 feet (150 m) using a breathing gas containing helium. The effects experienced, and the severity of those effects, depend on the rate of descent, the depth and percentage of helium.

"Helium tremors" were first widely described in 1965 by Royal Navy physiologist Peter B. Bennett, who also founded the Divers Alert Network. Russian scientist G. L. Zal'tsman also reported on helium tremors in his experiments from 1961. However, these reports were not available in the West until 1967.

The term high-pressure nervous syndrome was first used by Brauer in 1968 to describe the combined symptoms of tremor, electroencephalography (EEG) changes, and somnolence that appeared during a 1,189-foot (362 m) chamber dive in Marseille.

== Failure of diving equipment ==
The underwater environment presents a constant hazard of asphyxiation due to drowning. Breathing apparatus used for diving is life-support equipment, and failure can have fatal consequences – reliability of the equipment and the ability of the diver to deal with a single point of failure are essential for diver safety. Failure of other items of diving equipment is generally not as immediately threatening, as provided the diver is conscious and breathing, there may be time to deal with the situation, however an uncontrollable gain or loss of buoyancy can put the diver at severe risk of decompression sickness, or of sinking to a depth where nitrogen narcosis or oxygen toxicity may render the diver incapable of managing the situation, which may lead to drowning while breathing gas remains available.

=== Failure of breathing apparatus ===
Most regulator malfunctions involve improper supply of breathing gas or water leaking into the gas supply. There are two main gas supply failure modes, where the regulator shuts off delivery, which is extremely rare, and free-flow, where the delivery will not stop and can quickly exhaust a scuba supply. Either of these can result in an out-of-gas emergency, a situation of high risk which requires immediate appropriate response.

The inlet to the cylinder valve may be protected by a sintered filter, and the inlet to the first stage is usually protected by a filter, both to prevent corrosion products or other contaminants in the cylinder from getting into the fine toleranced gaps in the moving parts of the first and second stage and jamming them, either open or closed. If enough dirt gets into these filters they themselves can be blocked sufficiently to reduce performance, but are unlikely to result in a total or sudden catastrophic failure. Sintered bronze filters can also gradually clog with corrosion products if they get wet. Inlet filter blockage will become more noticeable as the cylinder pressure drops.

Either of the stages may get stuck in the open position, causing a continuous flow of gas from the regulator known as a free-flow. This can be triggered by a range of causes, some of which can be easily remedied, others not. Possible causes include incorrect interstage pressure setting, incorrect second stage valve spring tension, damaged or sticking valve poppet, damaged valve seat, valve freezing, wrong sensitivity setting at the surface and in Poseidon servo-assisted second stages, low interstage pressure. The moving parts in first and second stages have fine tolerances in places, and some designs are more susceptible to contaminants causing friction between the moving parts. this may increase cracking pressure, reduce flow rate, increase work of breathing or induce free-flow, depending on what part is affected.

In cold conditions the cooling effect of gas expanding through a valve orifice may cool either first or second stage sufficiently to cause ice to form. External icing may lock up the spring and exposed moving parts of first or second stage, and freezing of moisture in the air may cause icing on internal surfaces. Either may cause the moving parts of the affected stage to jam open or closed. If the valve freezes closed, it will usually defrost quite rapidly and start working again, and may freeze open soon after. Freezing open is more of a problem, as the valve will then free-flow and cool further in a positive feedback loop, which can normally only be stopped by closing the cylinder valve and waiting for the ice to thaw. If not stopped, the cylinder will rapidly be emptied.

A slow leak of the first stage valve known as intermediate pressure creep can cause the interstage pressure to rise until either the next breath is drawn, or the pressure exerts more force on the second stage valve than can be resisted by the spring, and the valve opens briefly, often with a popping sound, to relieve the pressure. the frequency of the popping pressure relief depends on the flow in the second stage, the back pressure, the second stage spring tension and the magnitude of the leak. It may range from occasional loud pops to a constant hiss. Underwater the second stage may be damped by the water and the loud pops may become an intermittent or constant stream of bubbles. This is not usually a catastrophic failure mode, but should be fixed as it will get worse, and it wastes gas.

Gas leaks can be caused by burst or leaky hoses, defective o-rings, blown o-rings, particularly in yoke connectors, loose connections, and several of the previously listed malfunctions. Low pressure inflation hoses may fail to connect properly, or the non-return valve may leak. A burst low pressure hose will usually lose gas faster than a burst high pressure hose, as HP hoses usually have a flow restriction orifice in the fitting that screws into the port, as the submersible pressure gauge does not need high flow, and a slower pressure increase in the gauge hose is less likely to overload the gauge, while the hose to a second stage must provide high peak flow rate to minimize work of breathing. A relatively common o-ring failure occurs when the yoke clamp seal extrudes due to insufficient clamp force or elastic deformation of the clamp by impact with the environment.

Wet breathing is caused by water getting into the regulator and compromising breathing comfort and safety. Water can leak into the second stage body through damaged soft parts like torn mouthpieces, damaged exhaust valves and perforated diaphragms, through cracked housings, or through poorly sealing or fouled exhaust valves.

High work of breathing can be caused by high inhalation resistance, high exhalation resistance or both. High inhalation resistance can be caused by high cracking pressure, low interstage pressure, friction in second stage valve moving parts, excessive spring loading, or sub-optimum valve design. It can usually be improved by servicing and tuning, but some regulators cannot deliver high flow at great depths without high work of breathing. High exhalation resistance is usually due to a problem with the exhaust valves, which can stick, stiffen due to deterioration of the materials, or may have an insufficient flow passage area for the service. Work of breathing increases with gas density, and therefore with depth. Total work of breathing for the diver is a combination of physiological work of breathing and mechanical work of breathing. It is possible for this combination to exceed the capacity of the diver, who can then suffocate due to carbon dioxide toxicity.

Juddering, shuddering and moaning are caused by an irregular and unstable flow from the second stage, which may be caused by a slight positive feedback between flow rate in the second stage body and diaphragm deflection opening the valve, which is not sufficient to cause free-flow, but enough to cause the system to hunt. It is more common on high-performance regulators which are tuned for maximum flow and minimum work of breathing, particularly out of the water, and often reduces or resolves when the regulator is immersed and the ambient water damps the movement of the diaphragm and other moving parts. Desensitising the second stage by closing venturi assists or increasing the valve spring pressure often stops this problem. Juddering may also be caused by excessive but irregular friction of valve moving parts.

Physical damage to the housing or components such as cracked housings, torn or dislodged mouthpieces, damaged exhaust fairings, can cause gas flow problems or leaks, or can make the regulator uncomfortable to use or difficult to breathe from.

==== Full-face masks and helmets ====
Flooding of a full-face mask or diving helmet is also a failure of the breathing apparatus that must be corrected immediately, as this interrupts the path of breathing gas to the diver. Depending on the cause of the flood, this may be trivial or difficult to correct.

=== Failure of depth control equipment ===
Rapid and uncontrolled depth changes can seriously endanger the diver. An uncontrolled ascent can lead to decompression illness, and uncontrolled descent can take the diver to a depth where the equipment and breathing gas are not appropriate, and can cause debilitating narcosis, acute oxygen toxicity, barotraumas of descent, rapid exhaustion of breathing gas supplies, excessive work of breathing, and inability to surface. These effects can be caused by failures of weighting and buoyancy control equipment. Surface-supplied divers may avoid these problems in many cases by using a bell or stage for vertical travel through the water, but scuba divers need to be appropriately buoyant at all times when in the water.

Diving weighting systems can cause problems if the diver carries too much or too little weight, if the weights are dropped at the wrong time, or cannot be dropped when it is necessary. Over and underweighting are common operator errors, often associated with inexperience, poor training, and lack of understanding of the necessary procedures for correct selection of weights. Weighting systems are usually very reliable. Occasionally weights will fall off through no fault of the diver, if a buckle or clip is released through contact with the surroundings.

Buoyancy control is the use of adjustable buoyancy equipment to balance equipment which changes buoyancy but is not controlled by the diver, such as changes due to depth and gas consumption. Ballast weight is normally constant during the dive, but buoyancy is adjustable by controlling the volume of gas-filled spaces. It is simple to inflate a gas filled space at ambient pressure to achieve neutral buoyancy, but any change of depth will affect the volume and therefore the buoyancy of the system. The diver must make compensatory adjustments to retain neutral buoyancy whenever the depth varies. Any unintentional change in the gas volume can rapidly escalate a buoyancy imbalance, and the system is inherently unstable. Gas leaks into or out of the buoyancy compensator bladder or dry suit must be corrected before they become uncontrollable.

When deploying a DSMB or a lift bag, entanglement and reel jams can prevent free deployment of line. It must be possible to abandon the buoyant equipment to avoid being pulled up too fast. Clipping the reel to the diver increases this risk.

=== Failure of other equipment ===
Failures of other diving equipment can endanger the diver, but are generally less immediate in their effect, allowing the diver a reasonable amount of time to compensate.

- Thermal insulation and heating:
- Communications equipment: For safety and efficiency, divers may need to communicate with others diving with them, or with their surface support team. The interface between air and water is an effective barrier to direct sound transmission, The equipment used by divers and the pressurised environment are also hindrances to sound-based communication. Communication is most critical in an emergency, where high stress levels make effective communication more difficult, and the circumstances of the emergency may make the communication physically more difficult. Voice communication is natural and effective where it is practicable, and most people rely on it for fast and accurate communication in most circumstances. In some cases a voice communications failure is merely an inconvenience, but when it prevents the surface team from ensuring that the diver is safe during the transport of heavy equipment to and from the worksite, it can endanger the diver. In these cases the dive will normally be terminated.
- Loss of mask
- Loss of fins
- Breaking of guideline
- Failure of instrumentation - Dive computer, timer, depth gauge, submersible pressure gauge
- Failure of dive lights

== Mode of diving ==
Each mode of diving has associated advantages and disadvantages, which include mode specific hazards. Risk management in diving often requires the selection of a specific mode which minimises the risk for the specific planned dive profile, activity and other circumstances, or restricts it to an acceptable level.

== Diving environment ==
=== Loss of body heat ===
==== To the water ====
Water conducts heat from the diver 25 times more effectively than air, which can lead to hypothermia even in mild water temperatures. Symptoms of hypothermia include impaired judgment and dexterity, which can quickly become deadly in an aquatic environment. In all but the warmest waters, divers need the thermal insulation provided by wetsuits or drysuits. For extreme exposure, active heating can be provided by chemical heat packs or battery powered heated underwear, or by hot-water suits.

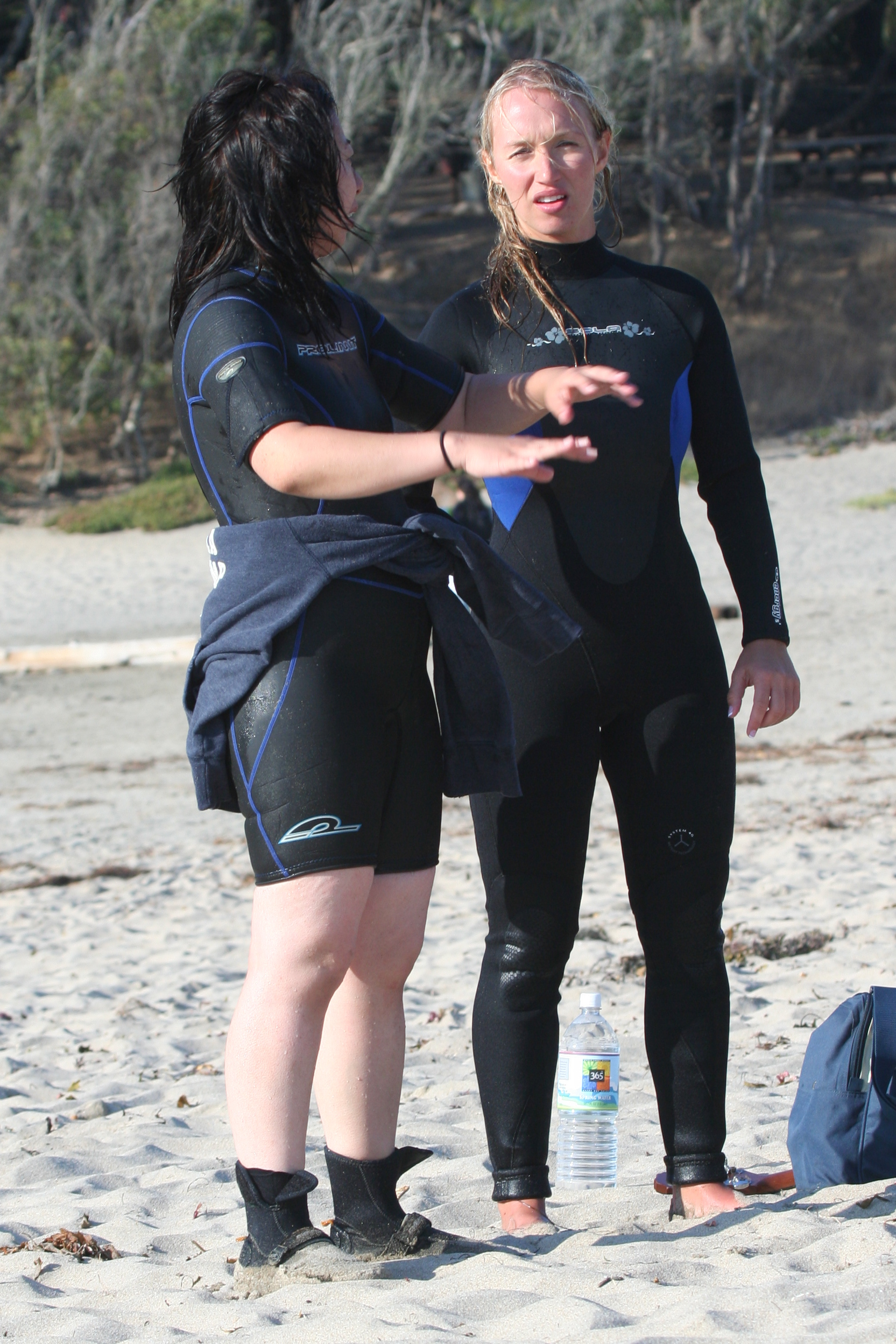
Spring suit (short legs and sleeves) and steamer (full legs and sleeves)

In the case of a wetsuit, the suit is designed to minimise heat loss. Wetsuits are usually made of foamed neoprene that has small closed bubbles, generally containing nitrogen, trapped in it during the manufacturing process. The poor thermal conductivity of this expanded cell neoprene means that wetsuits reduce loss of body heat by conduction to the surrounding water. The neoprene, and to a larger extent the nitrogen gas in the bubbles, function as an insulator. The effectiveness of the insulation is reduced when the suit is compressed due to depth, as the nitrogen filled bubbles are then smaller and the compressed gas in them conducts heat better. The second way in which wetsuits can reduce heat loss is to trap the water which leaks into the suit. Body heat is then lost to heat the trapped water, and provided the suit is reasonably well-sealed at all openings (neck, wrists, ankles, zippers and overlaps with other suit components), this water mostly remains inside the suit and is not replaced by more cold water, which would take up more body heat, and this helps reduce the rate of heat loss. This principle is specifically applied in the "Semi-Dry" wetsuit. The insulation value of the water trapped in the suit is negligible. Use of a wetsuit can add the hazard of loss of buoyancy due to suit compression with depth.

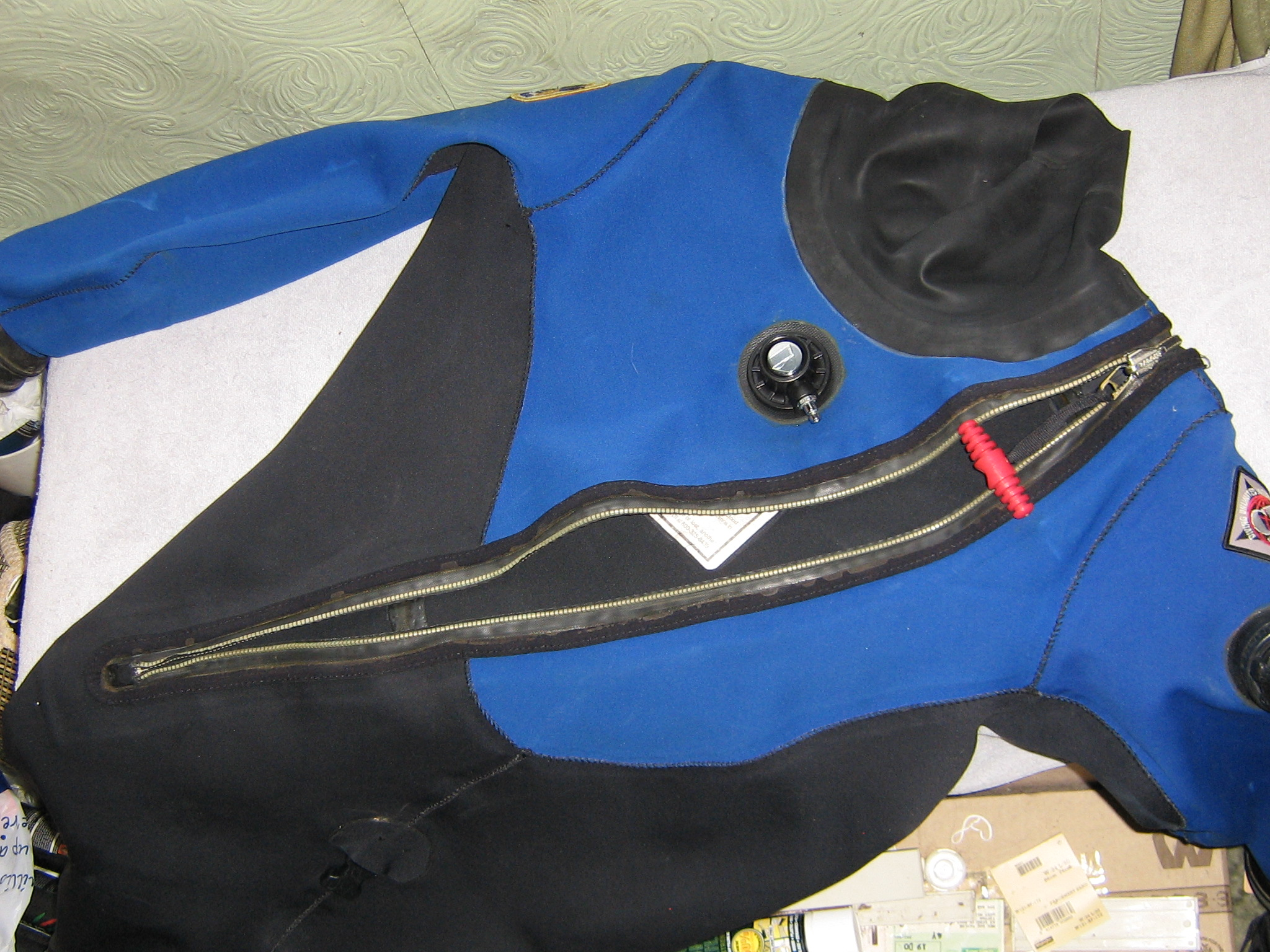
Dry suit with front entry zipper

A dry suit functions by keeping the diver and their insulating garments dry. The suit is waterproof and sealed so that water cannot penetrate the suit. Special purpose undergarments are usually worn under a dry suit to hold a layer of gas between the diver and the suit for thermal insulation. Some divers carry an extra gas bottle dedicated to filling the dry suit, which may contain argon gas, because it is a better insulator than air. Dry suits should not be inflated with gases containing helium as it is a good thermal conductor.

Dry suits fall into two main categories: Membrane or Shell dry suits are usually a trilaminate or coated textile construction. The material is thin and not a very good insulator, so the insulation is provided by the air trapped in the undersuit. Neoprene drysuits have a similar construction to wetsuits; these are often considerably thicker (7–8 mm) and have sufficient inherent insulation to allow a lighter-weight undersuit (or none at all); however on deeper dives the neoprene can compress to as little as 2 mm, losing much of its insulation. Compressed or crushed neoprene may also be used (where the neoprene is pre-compressed to 2–3 mm) which reduces the variation of insulating properties with depth. These dry suits function more like a membrane suit with greater stretch. Use of a dry suit is associated with the hazards of suit leaks, causing loss of insulation, suit floods, with loss of buoyancy, and suit blow-ups which can cause uncontrolled ascents.

Hot-water suits are used in cold water commercial surface-supplied diving. These suits are normally made of foamed neoprene and are similar to wetsuits in construction and appearance, but they do not fit as closely by design. The wrists and ankles of the suit are loose-fitting, allowing water to flush out of the suit as it is replenished with more hot water from the surface. A hose in the umbilical line, which links the diver to the surface support, carries the hot water from a heater on the surface down to the suit. The diver controls the flow rate of the water from a valve at the hip, allowing control of the warmth of the suit in response to changes in environmental conditions and workload. Tubes inside the suit distribute the water to the limbs, chest, and back. Boots, gloves, and hood are also supplied with hot water from the ends of the distribution hoses.

Hot-water suits are commonly used for deep dives in cold water when breathing mixes containing helium are used. Helium conducts heat much more efficiently than air, but has a lower heat capacity. The expansion of gas when pressure is reduced in the diving regulator causes intense cooling, and the chilled gas is heated to body temperature and humidified in the alveoli, which causes rapid heat loss from the body by conduction and evaporation. The amount of heat loss is proportional to the mass of gas breathed, which is proportional to ambient pressure at depth, so the diver will lose large amounts of body heat through the lungs when breathing. This compounds the risk of hypothermia already present in the cold waters at these depths. Under these conditions the hot water supply to the suit is a matter of survival, not comfort. Just as an emergency backup source of breathing gas is required, a backup water heater is also an essential precaution whenever dive conditions warrant a hot water suit. If the heater fails and a backup unit cannot be immediately brought online, a diver in the coldest conditions can succumb to hypothermia within minutes if they cannot get back into a dry bell. Depending on decompression obligations, bringing the diver directly to the surface could prove equally deadly.

Heated water in the suit forms an active insulation barrier to heat loss, but the temperature must be regulated within fairly close limits. If the temperature falls below about 32 °C (90 °F), hypothermia can result, and temperatures above 45 °C (113 °F) can cause burn injury to the diver. The diver may not notice a gradual change in inlet temperature, and in the early stages of hypo- or hyperthermia, may not notice the deteriorating condition. The suit is loose fitting to allow unimpeded water flow. This causes a large volume of water (13 to 22 litres) to be held in the suit, which can impede swimming due to the added inertia. When controlled correctly, the hot water suit is safe, comfortable and effective, and allows the diver adequate control of thermal protection.

==== To the breathing gas ====
The expansion of compressed breathing gas in the diving regulator causes intense cooling, and the chilled gas is heated to body temperature and humidified in the alveoli, which causes rapid heat loss from the body by conduction and evaporation. The amount of heat loss is proportional to the mass of gas breathed, which is proportional to ambient pressure at depth. Helium has a higher heat conductivity than nitrogen and oxygen, but has a lower specific heat, so heat loss to helium based breathing gases is less than to air or nitrox.

This heat loss to breathing gas compounds the risk of hypothermia already present in the cold temperatures usually found at greater depths.

==== To the habitat atmosphere ====
Heat loss to the habitat atmosphere is significant in saturation diving. Heat is lost to the ambient gas in a closed diving bell, saturation accommodation and decompression chambers, and underwater habitats, particularly when there is a helium component to the gas, due to the high thermal conductivity of helium.

=== Injuries due to contact with the solid surroundings ===
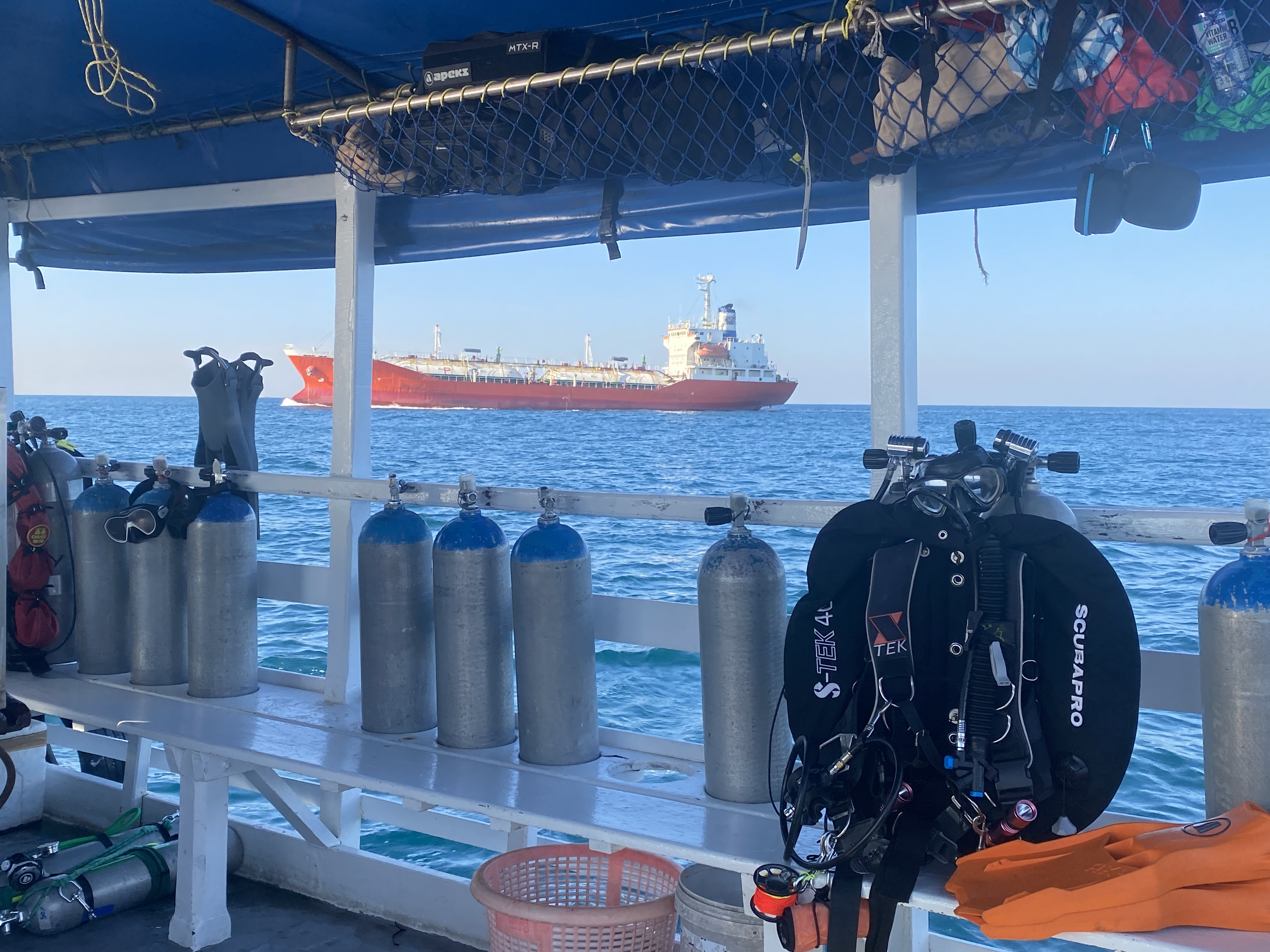
Ship Passing over Thunder Bowl Dive site near Samae San Island

Some parts of the underwater environment are sharp or abrasive, and can damage unprotected skin. Diving suits also help prevent the diver's skin being damaged by rough or sharp underwater objects, marine animals, hard corals, or metal debris commonly found on shipwrecks. Ordinary protective clothing such as overalls and gloves, or special purpose clothing such as dive skins and rash vests can effectively protect against some of these hazards. A combination of overalls worn over a diving suit is worn by some professional divers. Helmets similar to climbing helmets are effective protection against banging one's head on a rough overhead surface, particularly if a neoprene hood is not worn. A diving helmet is very effective for impact protection.

Marine vessels such as other dive boats, tourist speed boats and potentially commercial ships pose a potentially fatal risk to divers surfacing or on decompression stops. In such circumstances it is important to always dive with a Delayed surface marker buoy and be familiar with boat traffic routes in and around the dive site.

=== Unexploded Ordnance (UXO) ===
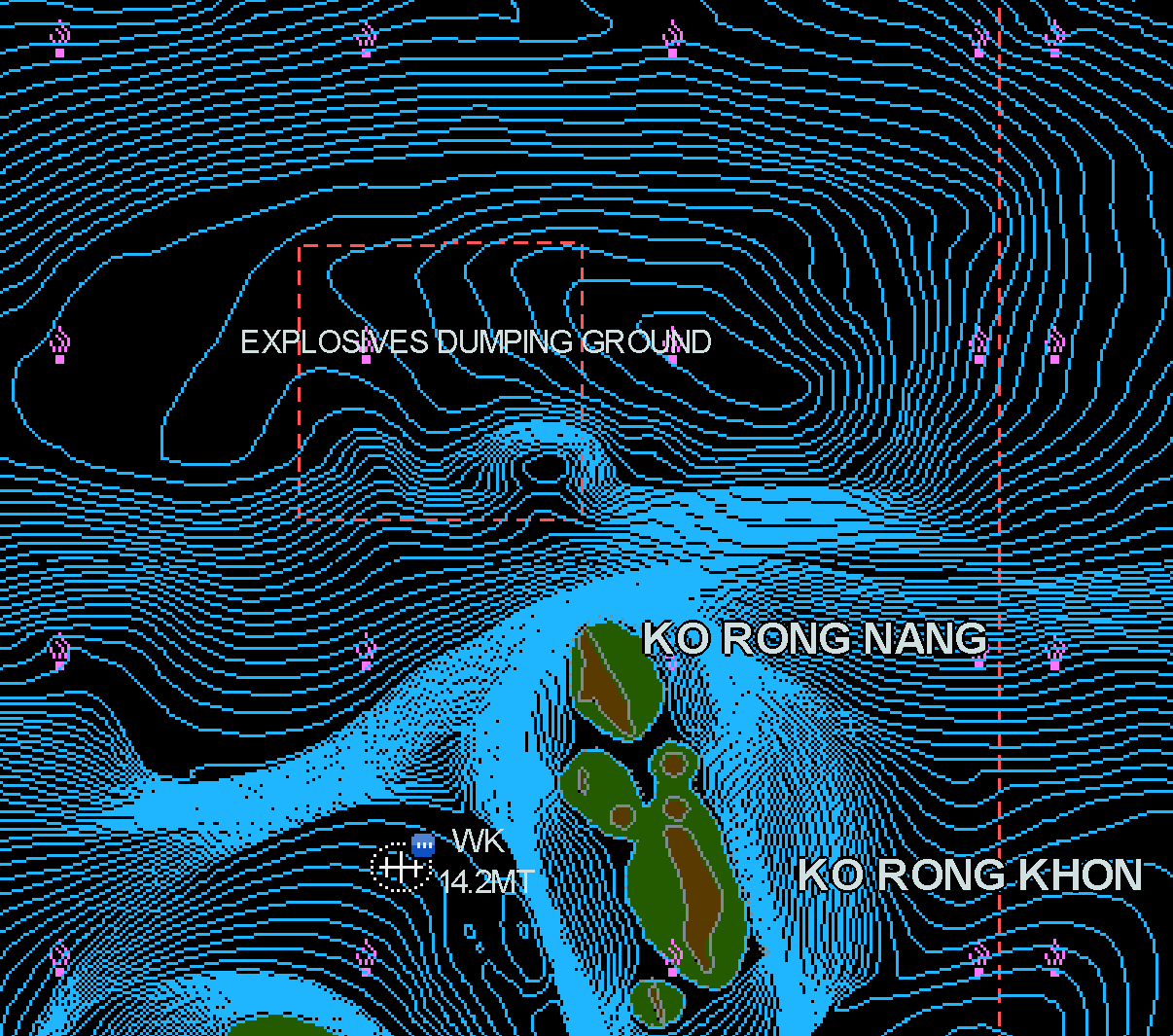
Samaesan Hole Map - "Explosives Dumping Ground" marked on sea chart

A number of dive sites around the world may have unexploded ordnance (UXO or UXB) that poses a fatal risk to divers. These areas are typically marked on sea charts as dangerous. If diving in area with known unexploded ordnance then ensure effective buoyancy control and trim to prevent contact. Also, refrain from picking up "interesting items" from the sea bed.

=== Dangerous marine animals ===
Some marine animals can be hazardous to divers. In most cases this is a defensive reaction to contact with, or molestation by the diver.

- Sharp hard coral skeleton edges can lacerate or abrade exposed skin, and contaminate the wound with coral tissue and pathogenic microorganisms.
- Stinging hydroids can cause skin rash, local swelling and inflammation by contact with bare skin.
- Stinging jellyfish can cause skin rash, local swelling and inflammation, sometimes extremely painful, occasionally dangerous or even fatal
- Stingrays have a sharp spine near the base of the tail which can produce a deep puncture or laceration that leaves venom in the wound as a result of a defensive reaction when disturbed or threatened.
- Some fish and invertebrates such as lionfish, stonefish, crown-of-thorns starfish, and some sea urchins have spines which can produce puncture wounds with venom injection. These are often extremely painful and may be fatal in rare cases. Usually caused by impact with the stationary animal.
- The venomous blue-ringed octopus may on rare occasions bite a diver.
- Lacerations by shark teeth can involve deep wounds, loss of tissue and amputation, with major blood loss. In extreme cases death may result. This may result from attack or investigation by a shark with bites. The risk depends on location, conditions, and species. Most sharks do not have suitable teeth for predation on large animals, but may bite in defence when startled or molested.
- Crocodiles can injure by lacerations and punctures by teeth, brute force tearing of tissues, and the possibility of drowning.
- The tropical Indo-Pacific Titan triggerfish is very territorial during breeding season and will attack and bite divers.
- Very large groupers have been known to bite divers, resulting in bite wounds, bruising and crushing injuries. This has been linked to divers feeding fish.
- Electric shock is the defence mechanism of electric rays, in some tropical to warm temperate seas.
- Venomous sea snakes are a minor hazard in some regions. The venom is highly toxic, but the snakes are generally timid and their fangs are short.

=== Overhead environments ===
Scuba divers may get lost in wrecks and caves, under ice or inside complex structures where there is no direct route to the surface, and be unable to identify the way out, and may run out of breathing gas and drown. Getting lost is often a result of not using a distance line, or losing it in darkness or bad visibility, but sometimes due to the line breaking. Inappropriate response due to claustrophobia and panic is also possible. Occasionally injury or entrapment by collapsing structure or rock-falls can occur.

=== Entanglement ===
Another form of entrapment is when the diver or diving equipment is physically restrained by the environment. Some entrapment can be released by cutting free, such as entanglement in ropes, lines and nets. The risk of entrapment is often greater with smaller diameter line, and larger mesh nets. Fortunately these are also less work to cut free if a suitable implement is available. Entanglement is a far greater risk to divers with a limited breathing gas supply, and without communications to a stand-by diver. There is also a risk of losing the cutting tool during the attempt to cut free. In areas of known high entanglement risk such as wrecks in fishing grounds, which often accumulate nets and fishing lines, divers may carry redundant cutting tools, often of different types, as a tool well suited to cutting thick rope may not be optimal for cutting thin nets.

=== Localised pressure differentials ===
Commonly referred to by professional divers as delta-p (δp or ΔP), these hazards are due to a pressure difference causing a flow, which if restricted, will result in a large force on the obstruction to the flow. The most dangerous pressure differentials are those causing outflow from the region occupied by a diver and any attached equipment, as the resultant forces will tend to force the diver into the outflow stream, which may carry the diver or equipment such as the umbilical into a confined space such as intake ducting, drain openings, sluice gates or penstocks, and which may be occupied by moving machinery such as impellers or turbines. When possible, a lockout-tagout system is used to disable the hazard during diving operations, or the divers umbilical is restrained to prevent the diver from getting into the danger zone. This method is used when it is not practicable to shut down equipment, like the bow thrusters on a dynamically positioned diving support vessel, which must be operating during the dive to keep the diver in the right place. Scuba divers are particularly vulnerable to delta-p hazards, and should generally not dive in areas where a delta-p hazard is suspected to exist. Ideally outlets should be designed to eliminate the possibility the diver's body can seal off the outlet (trapping the diver from the pressure difference) - slots, various mesh covers over circular holes, or outlets with multiple holes some distance away from each other allow water to still move through the outlet and around the diver.

=== Water movement ===
- Currents:
  - Rip currents and undertow are localised inshore currents induced by waves, but can be too strong for a diver to traverse or perform useful work.
  - Overfalls and whirlpools. An overfall is a turbulent volume of water downstream of a ridge or drop-off, or where two currents meet. A whirlpool is a body of rotating water produced by opposing currents or a current running into an obstacle. Both of these phenomena can entrain a diver and cause a rapid change of depth, disorientation or impact with the environment.
  - Tidal currents, races and bores
  - Local wind can induce a current which can cause problems for the unwary diver, such as making the return swim difficult or impossible. The direction and strength of these currents depend on wind direction, strength and duration, depth, and the latitude of the location. Ekman transport causes the current direction to be offset from wind direction.
  - Ocean currents can flow strongly enough to make diving difficult. This is usually reasonably predictable. In some places the local topography can induce enough turbulence to be dangerous.
  - River and inland water currents can be strong and dangerous in areas of high gradient.
- Wave motion, surf and surge are variable depending on the size and period of the waves, their direction of approach, and the bottom topography.

=== Loss of visibility ===
Loss of visibility in itself is not harmful to the diver, but can increase the risk of an adverse incident due to other hazards if the diver cannot avoid or manage them effectively. The most obvious of these is the potential to get lost in an environment where the diver cannot simply ascend to the surface, such as the inside of a wreck or cave, or underneath a large ship. The risk is much greater for scuba divers as surface supplied divers have a secure breathing gas supply, and can follow the umbilical out of the overhead environment without extreme urgency. Loss of visibility can also allow the diver to approach other hazards such as pinch points and unexpected delta-p hazards. Scuba divers who enter overhead environments can take precautions to mitigate the effects of the two most common causes of loss of visibility, which are siltout and dive light failure. To compensate for dive light failure the standard procedure is to carry at least three lights, each of which is sufficient for the planned dive, and siltout can be managed by ensuring a continuous and correctly marked guideline to the exit, and staying close to it at all times. In extreme circumstances the diver may not be able to read critical data from instruments and this may compromise a safe ascent.

== Hazards inherent in the diver ==
=== Pre-existing physiological and psychological conditions in the diver ===
Some physical and psychological conditions are known or suspected to increase the risk of injury or death in the underwater environment, or to increase the risk of a stressful incident developing into a serious incident culminating in injury or death. Conditions which significantly compromise the cardiovascular system, respiratory system or central nervous system may be considered absolute or relative contraindications for diving, as are psychological conditions which impair judgement or compromise the ability to deal calmly and systematically with deteriorating conditions which a competent diver should be able to manage.

==== Hydration ====
Dehydration before or during a dive can increase the risk of decompression sickness, and excessive hydration before a dive can increase the risk of immersion pulmonary oedema. Normal hydration avoids both of these predisposing factors

=== Diver behaviour and competence ===
Safety of underwater diving operations can be improved by reducing the frequency of human error and the consequences when it does occur. Human error can be defined as an individual's deviation from acceptable or desirable practice which culminates in undesirable or unexpected results. Human error is inevitable and everyone makes mistakes at some time. The consequences of these errors are varied and depend on many factors. Most errors are minor and do not cause significant harm, but others can have catastrophic consequences. Human error and panic are considered to be the leading causes of dive accidents and fatalities.

- Inadequate learning or practice of critical safety skills may result in the inability to deal with minor incidents, which consequently may develop into major incidents.
- Overconfidence can result in diving in conditions beyond the diver's competence, with high risk of accident due to inability to deal with known environmental hazards.
- Inadequate strength or fitness for the conditions can result in inability to compensate for difficult conditions even though the diver may be well versed at the required skills, and could lead to over-exertion, overtiredness, stress injuries or exhaustion.
- Peer pressure can cause a diver to dive in conditions where they may be unable to deal with reasonably predictable incidents.
- Diving with an incompetent buddy can result in injury or death while attempting to deal with a problem caused by the buddy.
- Overweighting can cause difficulty in neutralising and controlling buoyancy, and this can lead to uncontrolled descent, inability to establish neutral buoyancy, inefficient swimming, high gas consumption, poor trim, kicking up silt, difficulty in ascent and inability to control depth accurately for decompression.
- Underweighting can cause difficulty in neutralising and controlling buoyancy, and consequent inability to achieve neutral buoyancy, particularly at decompression stops.
- Diving under the influence of drugs or alcohol, or with a hangover may result in inappropriate or delayed response to contingencies, reduced ability to deal timeously with problems, leading to greater risk of developing into an accident, increased risk of hypothermia and increased risk of decompression sickness.
- Use of inappropriate equipment and/or configuration can lead to a whole range of complications, depending on the details.
- High task loading due to a combination of these factors can result in a dive that goes well enough until something goes wrong, and the diver's residual capacity is not enough to cope with the changed circumstances. This can be followed by a cascade of failures, as each problem loads the diver more and triggers the next. In such cases the diver is lucky to survive, even with the assistance of a buddy or team, and there is a significant risk of others becoming part of the accident.

== Hazards of the diving support infrastructure ==
Diving support infrastructure for recreational diving includes dive buddies, charter boats, dive shops, schools etc. Professional diving support infrastructure includes dive teams, diving spreads, diving support vessels, remotely operated vehicles, occupational health and safety legislation and enforcement, contractors and clients.

=== Behaviour of support personnel ===
Where support personnel are required, their input and behaviour can have a profound effect on diving operational safety. This is particularly relevant to professional diving operations where the safety of the working diver is to a large extent in the hands of the support personnel, specifically the diving supervisor, standby diver, medical and life-support systems support, and responsible behaviour of the employer.

Recreational divers, once competent, are less reliant on support personnel in most cases, but dive boat personnel and owners can provide a safe platform with competent handling and appropriate equipment, or fail to do so, sometimes in ways that are not obvious until after an accident.

=== Safety culture of the organisation or peer group ===
- Organisational influences
- Peer pressure from the dive buddy
- Pressure from the dive leader of a group
- Adequate briefings for divers unfamiliar with the local environment
- Certification of divers who are not sufficiently competent
- Pressure from the employer to increase sales turnover of certification, dives and merchandise
- Pressure from the client or diving contractor to get the work done on schedule

=== Hazards of the dive platform ===
Movable dive platforms allow diving in a wide range of places that would be otherwise inaccessible, but this mobility leads to a range of hazards inherent in a mobile platform, and additional hazards of the technology used to move the platform or hold it in position.

- Anchored platforms: The hazards include injury by the mooring system, and currents and wind, which may make it difficult or impossible to get back to the platform. The risk is lower with surface-supplied diving as the umbilical allows the crew to pull the diver back to the boat. Scuba divers can surface away from the boat and be unable to swim back against the current or wind.
- Live-boating: Diving operations from a manually controlled vessel under way, which may use the propulsion system to maneuver during the dive, with associated hazards to the diver. The risk is greater with surface-supplied equipment as the umbilical is at risk during the whole dive, whereas a scuba diver is clear of the hazard zone when sufficiently submerged, or at a reasonable distance from the vessel. The times of greatest risk are when the diver surfaces if the skipper is not aware of the diver's position, when the vessel approaches the diver on the surface, and when boarding at the end of the dive, when the diver is necessarily close to the vessel.
- Dynamic positioning: The hazards are mainly the automated thrusters used to hold station. The risk is unacceptable unless the diver is physically constrained from approaching the thrusters' danger zones. This is achieved by deploying the divers by diving stage or bell, limiting the length of excursion umbilical that can be let out, and using underwater tending points where necessary. Scuba is not used from dynamically positioned vessels.
- Dive boat access facilities are intended to make water entry and exit safer and more convenient, but they come with their own sets of alternative hazards.
- Diving bells and stages used to transport the surface-supplied working diver are classified as safety equipment as their use reduces specific risks, but they also require correct operation to avoid other hazards inherent in their design and function.

== The dive task and associated equipment ==
Some underwater tasks may present hazards related to the activity or the equipment used, In some cases it is the use of the equipment, in some cases transporting the equipment during the dive, and in some cases the additional task loading, or any combination of these that is the hazard.

- Hazmat diving is, by definition, diving in the presence of hazardous materials. The nature of the risk will vary depending on the circumstances, particularly the specific hazardous materials present.
- Ordnance disposal exposes the operator to explosive devices.
- Demolition may involve explosives. The diver may be required to place explosives and prepare the detonation system. Demolition also often involves unstable and otherwise hazardous structures, heavy lifting, and the moving of large objects.
- Underwater construction is associated with many of the usual hazards of a construction site, complicated by visibility and communication difficulties.
- Oxy-arc cutting and Underwater welding present electrical and explosion hazards, and sometimes falling objects.
- Rigging, lifting and placing heavy objects
- Underwater search and recovery
- High-pressure water jetting uses equipment that projects a jet of water capable of cutting through diving suits and the diver.
- Airlifts and suction dredging may require the diver to operate and direct the suction inlet, which develops a strong pressure differential capable of injuring the diver.

== See also ==
- Bellman (diving) – The member of a dive team who acts as stand-by diver and tender from the diving bell
- Buddy diving – Practice of mutual monitoring and assistance between two divers
- Diver rescue – Rescue of a distressed or incapacitated diver
- Underwater diving environment – Underwater environment to which a diver may be exposed
- Diving safety – Risk management of underwater diving activities
- Diving supervisor – Professional diving team leader responsible for safety
- Diving team – Group of people working together to enhance dive safety and achieve a task
- Investigation of diving accidents – Forensic investigation of underwater diving accidents
- Public safety diving – Underwater work done by law enforcement, rescue and search and recovery teams
- Rescue diver – Recreational scuba certification emphasising emergency response and diver rescue
- Safety diver – Support diver for a freediver
- Scuba diving fatalities – Deaths occurring while scuba diving or as a consequence of scuba diving
- Stand-by diver – A member of a dive team who is ready to assist or rescue the working diver
- Underwater diving emergency – Situation that endangers the life or health of a diver
- Underwater environment – Aquatic or submarine environment
- Underwater search and recovery – Locating and recovering underwater objects
