= List of diving hazards and precautions =

Hazards associated with underwater diving

Divers face specific physical and health risks when they go underwater with scuba or other diving equipment, or use high pressure breathing gas. Some of these factors also affect people who work in raised pressure environments out of water, for example in caissons. This article lists hazards that a diver may be exposed to during a dive, and possible consequences of these hazards, with some details of the proximate causes of the listed consequences. A listing is also given of precautions that may be taken to reduce vulnerability, either by reducing the risk or mitigating the consequences. A hazard that is understood and acknowledged may present a lower risk if appropriate precautions are taken, and the consequences may be less severe if mitigation procedures are planned and in place.

A hazard is any agent or situation that poses a level of threat to life, health, property, or environment. Most hazards remain dormant or potential, with only a theoretical risk of harm, and when a hazard becomes active, and produces undesirable consequences, it is called an incident and may culminate in an emergency or accident. Hazard and vulnerability interact with likelihood of occurrence to create risk, which can be the probability of a specific undesirable consequence of a specific hazard, or the combined probability of undesirable consequences of all the hazards of a specific activity. The presence of a combination of several hazards simultaneously is common in diving, and the effect is generally increased risk to the diver, particularly where the occurrence of an incident due to one hazard triggers other hazards with a resulting cascade of incidents. Many diving fatalities are the result of a cascade of incidents overwhelming the diver, who should be able to manage any single reasonably foreseeable incident. The assessed risk of a dive would generally be considered unacceptable if the diver is not expected to cope with any single reasonably foreseeable incident with a significant probability of occurrence during that dive. Precisely where the line is drawn depends on circumstances. Commercial diving operations tend to be less tolerant of risk than recreational, particularly technical divers, who are less constrained by occupational health and safety legislation.

Decompression sickness and arterial gas embolism in recreational diving are associated with certain demographic, environmental, and dive style factors. A statistical study published in 2005 tested potential risk factors: age, gender, body mass index, smoking, asthma, diabetes, cardiovascular disease, previous decompression illness, years since certification, dives in last year, number of diving days, number of dives in a repetitive series, last dive depth, nitrox use, and drysuit use. No significant associations with decompression sickness or arterial gas embolism were found for asthma, diabetes, cardiovascular disease, smoking, or body mass index. Increased depth, previous DCI, days diving, and being male were associated with higher risk for decompression sickness and arterial gas embolism. Nitrox and drysuit use, greater frequency of diving in the past year, increasing age, and years since certification were associated with lower risk, possibly as indicators of more extensive training and experience.

Statistics show diving fatalities comparable to motor vehicle accidents of 16.4 per 100,000 divers and 16 per 100,000 drivers. Divers Alert Network 2014 data shows there are 3.174 million recreational scuba divers in America, of which 2.351 million dive 1 to 7 times per year and 823,000 dive 8 or more times per year. It is reasonable to say that the average would be in the neighbourhood of 5 dives per year.

== The aquatic environment ==
Hazard	Consequences	Cause	Avoidance and prevention
Any liquid environment.	Asphyxia by drowning.; Near drowning is the survival of a drowning event involving unconsciousness or water inhalation and can lead to serious secondary complications, including death, after the event.	Inhalation of liquid (water), usually causing laryngospasm and suffocation caused by water entering the lungs and preventing the absorption of oxygen leading to cerebral hypoxia.	Avoid out of air emergencies underwater.; Use of a redundant emergency breathing gas supply; Provide appropriate buoyancy.; Avoid or prevent accidents resulting in unconsciousness.; Use of a full face mask or diving helmet to protect the airway.; Use of surface-supplied diving equipment with voice communications.; Adequate swimming skills and fitness for the circumstances.; Use of snorkel when appropriate.; Lifejackets that hold the wearer's face above the water may be worn when appropriate.; Availability of a stand-by diver or reliable dive buddy to assist.; Competence in recovering and clearing a dislodged scuba regulator.; Use of an alternative regulator which can be easily reached if the dislodged primary is difficult to reach.
Any liquid environment.	Complications can occur up to 72 hours after a non-fatal drowning incident, and may lead to a serious condition or death.	Physiological responses to contaminants in the lung due to inhalation of liquid.: Exudation of liquid into the lungs (pulmonary edema) over the hours following aspiration of liquid, which reduces the ability to exchange air and can lead to a person "drowning in their own body fluid".; Aspiration of vomit can have a similar effect.	Prompt and appropriate medical treatment after near drowning, including a medical observation period.

== Use of breathing equipment in an underwater environment ==
Hazard	Consequences	Cause	Avoidance and prevention
Oxygen partial pressure in the breathing gas is too low to sustain normal activity or consciousness.	Hypoxia: Reduced level of consciousness, seizures, coma, death. Severe hypoxia induces a blue discoloration of the skin, called cyanosis, but this may also be present in a diver due to peripheral vasoconstriction resulting from exposure to cold. There is typically no warning of onset or development.	Equipment failure: A faulty or misused rebreather can provide the diver with hypoxic gas.	Correct maintenance, preparation and pre-use procedures and checks.; Correct use of recommended procedures and checklists when preparing for use.; Calibration of oxygen monitoring instruments; Adequate and redundant instrumentation for monitoring gas quality during use.; Constant vigilance during use.; Adequate bailout facilities in case of failure.; Adequate training in the use of rebreathers in general and the specific model.
Oxygen partial pressure in the breathing gas is too low to sustain normal activity or consciousness.	Hypoxia: Reduced level of consciousness, seizures, coma, death. Severe hypoxia induces a blue discoloration of the skin, called cyanosis, but this may also be present in a diver due to peripheral vasoconstriction resulting from exposure to cold. There is typically no warning of onset or development.	Some breathing gas mixtures for deep diving such as trimix and heliox are hypoxic at shallow depths, and do not contain enough oxygen to maintain consciousness, or sometimes life, at or near the surface.	Gas requirements planned to suit the intended dive profile.; Use of a travel gas mix for descent and a decompression gas mix for ascent through the depth range where the bottom gas is hypoxic.; Safe procedures used for gas switching.; Gas switches planned and executed at appropriate depths.; Depth and ascent rate accurately monitored and controlled.; Clear and unambiguous identification of cylinder gases.; Adequate training in the use of mixed gases.
Oxygen partial pressure in the breathing gas is too low to sustain normal activity or consciousness.	Hypoxia: Reduced level of consciousness, seizures, coma, death. Severe hypoxia induces a blue discoloration of the skin, called cyanosis, but this may also be present in a diver due to peripheral vasoconstriction resulting from exposure to cold. There is typically no warning of onset or development.	Internal corrosion of full cylinder standing for a long time can potentially use up some of the oxygen in the contained gas before the diver uses the cylinder.	Routine periodical inspection and testing of cylinders.; Analysis of oxygen fraction of gas before use, particularly if cylinder has been stored for a long time.
Loss of breathing gas supply.	May result in drowning, occasionally asphyxia without water aspiration.	Equipment failure: Several modes are possible.: Closing and jamming of the cylinder valve by rolloff on something overhead (rotation of the knob to close the valve by friction when dragged along in contact with a surface), or by kelp when pushing through dense kelp.; Rupture of a bursting disc overpressure protection on a cylinder valve (a thin metal membrane calibrated to fail if the pressure exceeds a safe value for the cylinder).; Rupture of a regulator hose or loss of the end component, leaving an open hose end.; Unrecoverable free flow of a second stage (valve jammed open, allowing gas to escape even when not needed by the diver).; Freezing of a first stage regulator, locking the valve mechanism open, and consequent free flow of the demand valve due to excessive interstage pressure.; O-ring failure at the connection of a regulator to a cylinder valve.	Appropriate maintenance and servicing of equipment.; Inspection of the external condition, and testing of the function of equipment before use.; Use only of equipment in good working condition.; Connection and mounting of equipment to minimise risk of damage.; Avoidance of damage to equipment during dives.; Use of two fully independent breathing gas supplies.; Use of bailout gas supply.; The buddy system, when correctly followed, allows the diver's buddy to supply breathing gas in an emergency.; "H" or "Y" type cylinder valves or manifolded twin cylinders with two cylinder valves allow the dysfunctional supply to be closed to prevent total loss, and the other regulator to be used for the remaining gas supply. (frequently used to mitigate regulator freezing in cold water); Dual independent cylinders ensure that if one cylinder supply fails there is another available.; Use of DIN connections can reduce the risk of catastrophic O-ring failure.; Emergency free ascent may be possible, and is generally more survivable than drowning.
Loss of breathing gas supply.	May result in drowning, occasionally asphyxia without water aspiration.	Running out of breathing gas because of poor gas monitoring discipline.	Adequate training of divers.; Disciplined attitude and situational awareness during dives.; Use of reserve valve.; Use of surface supplied diving equipment.; Use of bailout gas supply.; The buddy system, when correctly followed, allows the diver's buddy to supply breathing gas in an emergency.
Loss of breathing gas supply.	May result in drowning, occasionally asphyxia without water aspiration.	Running out of breathing gas because of being trapped by nets or lines.	Situational awareness underwater.; Use of a diver's net cutter, or dive tool/knife to cut free of entanglement.; Carrying sufficient gas in reserve to allow a reasonable amount of time to deal with emergencies.; Use of surface supplied breathing equipment.
Loss of breathing gas supply.	May result in drowning, occasionally asphyxia without water aspiration.	Running out of breathing gas because of being trapped or lost in enclosed spaces underwater, such as caves or shipwrecks.	Appropriate safety equipment and procedures to avoid getting lost (cave lines).; Specific training for overhead diving. See cave diving and wreck diving.; Assess stability of underwater structures and avoid entry if a structure is unstable.
Inhalation of salt spray	Salt water aspiration syndrome: a reaction to salt in the lungs.	Inhaling a mist of sea water from a faulty demand valve.	Appropriate maintenance and servicing of equipment.; Inspect external condition and test function before use. (specifically test the seal of exhaust valves and possible leaks in the second stage casing and mouthpiece before opening the cylinder valve).; Use equipment only if it is in good working condition.; Use of alternative air source if DV breathes wet during dive.; The technique of inhaling slowly and using the tongue to deflect spray particles may be effective as a temporary mitigation.
Carbon monoxide contamination of breathing gas	Carbon monoxide poisoning.	Contaminated air supplied by a compressor that sucked in products of combustion, often its own engine's exhaust gas. Aggravated by increased partial pressure due to depth.	Adequate precautions to ensure that intake is in uncontaminated air when operating breathing air compressors.; Periodical air quality testing of compressors.; Use of compressor output filter containing "Hopcalite" catalyst to convert possible carbon monoxide contamination to less hazardous carbon dioxide.; Test air quality before use (portable carbon monoxide analysers are available and may be worth using in places where air quality is questionable).; Air contaminated with carbon monoxide is often contaminated by substances having a smell or taste. Air smelling or tasting of exhaust fumes should not be breathed.
Carbon monoxide contamination of breathing gas	Carbon monoxide poisoning.	Oil getting into the air and partially oxidising in the compressor cylinder, like in a diesel engine, due to worn seals and use of unsuitable oils, or an overheated compressor.	Adequate maintenance of the compressor.; Use of correct oil rated for breathing air compressor lubrication.; Ensure compressor running temperature is within manufacturer's specifications.; Ensure adequate supply of cooling air to compressor.; Compressor should not be run when ambient temperatures exceed manufacturer's limits.
Hydrocarbon (oil) contamination of air supply.	Emphysema or lipid pneumonia (more to be added).	Caused by inhaling oil mist. This may happen gradually over a long time and is a particular risk with a surface supplied air feed.	Use of a suitable separators and air filter after compression.; Monitor and drain separators and change filters as necessary.; Periodic testing of delivered air quality.; Smell and taste can distinguish oil contamination in many cases.; Passing a metered quantity of the air through an absorbent filter paper may show up an oil deposit.; Directing air flow onto a clean mirror surface or glass sheet may show gross contamination.
Excessive carbon dioxide in breathing gas	Carbon dioxide poisoning or hypercapnia.	Re-inhaling carbon dioxide-laden exhaled gas due to excessive dead space in breathing apparatus.; Shallow breathing—not exchanging sufficient air during a breathing cycle.	Minimise the volume of any enclosed spaces through which the diver breathes. For example, this can happen with diving with a large "bubblehead" helmet.; Avoiding breathing shallow (low volume) breaths.
Excessive carbon dioxide in breathing gas	Carbon dioxide poisoning or hypercapnia.	The scrubber of a diving rebreather, fails to absorb enough of the carbon dioxide in recirculated breathing gas. This can be due to the scrubber absorbent being exhausted, the scrubber being too small, or the absorbent being badly packed or loose, causing "tunneling" and "scrubber breakthrough" when the gas emerging from the scrubber contains excessive carbon dioxide.	Adequate maintenance of rebreathers.; Correct packing and assembly of scrubber canisters.; Pre-use inspection and testing of rebreathers using an appropriate checklist.; Use of correct scrubber absorbent material.; Use of absorbent that is of good working quality.; Discard absorbent after use.; Use of carbon dioxide monitoring instruments.; Adequate training in the recognition of hypercapnia before using a rebreather.; Bail-out to open circuit if carbon dioxide levels get too high.
Excessive carbon dioxide in breathing gas	Carbon dioxide poisoning or hypercapnia.	Filling of cylinders with compressed air taken from an area of raised concentration of carbon dioxide.	Siting the compressor air intake in an area of fresh air and ducting it to the compressor.; Passing intake air through a carbon dioxide scrubber element before compression.; Periodical air quality testing of compressors.
Breathing the wrong gas	Consequences depend on the circumstances, but may include oxygen toxicity, hypoxia, nitrogen narcosis, anoxia, and toxic effects of gases not intended for breathing. Death or serious injury is likely.	The wrong gas was put in a cylinder.; A cylinder was marked or labelled incorrectly.; A correctly labelled cylinder was mistaken by the user.; The diver unintentionally switches to the wrong gas during a dive.	Cylinders should be filled by competent people.; Clear instructions, preferably written, for the composition of the gas to be mixed will reduce the risk of filling with the wrong gas.; Clear, unambiguous and legible labels indicating maximum operating depth and cylinder contents, applied in a way that the user will be able to positively identify the gas at the time when it is to be used can prevent confusion and inadvertent use of the wrong gas.; Analysing gas after filling, before accepting delivery, and before use (before the dive) may detect errors in labelling or composition in time to take corrective action.; Procedures designed to positively identify the gas may be used when switching mixes.; Valves that change gas mixes may be fitted with a positive interlock preventing accidental or inadvertent switching, and may include a method of confirming the gas connected by feel.
Displacement of demand valve (DV) from the diver's mouth.	Inability to breathe until demand valve is replaced. This should not normally be a major problem as techniques for DV recovery are part of basic training. Nevertheless, it is an urgent problem and may be exacerbated by loss of the mask and/or disorientation.	Unconscious diver releases grip on mouthpiece.; DV is forcibly knocked or pulled from the diver's mouth by impact with surroundings or another diver.	Use of full face mask reduces risk of loss of DV as it is strapped to the head and can not be dropped if the diver loses consciousness.; Adequate training and practice of DV recovery skills.; Use of an alternative air source such as octopus DV or bailout cylinder, which can be used if the primary DV is not immediately accessible.; Mounting the alternative air source and DV so that it is easily accessible in an emergency and protected from damage when not in use.
Caustic cocktail	Disruption of breathing by watery suspension/solution containing scrubber absorbent medium.; Aspiration of water contaminated by scrubber medium.	Leakage of water into the breathing loop of a rebreather, which dissolves alkaline material used to chemically remove carbon dioxide from exhaled air. This contaminated water may move further along the breathing loop and reach the diver's mouth, where it may cause choking, and in the case of strong alkalis, caustic corrosion of the mucous membranes.	Prevent ingress of water to rebreather by: checking before use that the unit does not leak, closing the dive/surface valve when the mouthpiece is not in the diver's mouth.; Prevent creation of caustic cocktail by: use of less soluble and less alkaline scubber media, design using water traps and drainage arrangements (on some rebreather designs), introducing a semi-permeable membrane to block water from the scrubber.; Avoid aspiration of water from loop by recognising the characteristic gurgling sounds and increased breathing resistance, and taking appropriate action by bailing out or draining the set if possible.; In the event of caustic cocktail reaching the mouth, bail out to alternative gas supply and rinse mouth with ambient water.

== Exposure to a pressurised environment and pressure changes ==
=== Pressure changes during descent ===
-
Hazard	Consequences	Cause	Avoidance and prevention
Sudden chilling of the inner ear.	Vertigo, including dizziness and disorientation, particularly if one side is more chilled than the other.	Cold water in the outer ear passage, chilling the inner ear, particularly severe if the eardrum is ruptured.	Use of a hood to keep the head covered. Water leaking into the hood will warm up before entering the external auditory opening and will be reasonably warm before reaching the eardrum, and will soon reach body temperature if flushing is minimised.
Pressure difference over eardrum	Burst or stretched eardrum: The eardrum is stretched due to a pressure difference between the outer and middle ear spaces. If the eardrum stretches sufficiently, it may rupture, which is more painful. Water entering the middle ear may cause vertigo when the inner ear is cooled. Contaminants in the water may cause infection.	The pressure in the middle ear not equalizing with external (ambient) pressure, usually due to failure to clear the Eustachian tube.	Ears can be equalized early and often during the descent, before the stretching is painful. The diver can check if the ears will clear on the surface as a precondition for diving.
Pressure difference over eardrum	Burst or stretched eardrum: The eardrum is stretched due to a pressure difference between the outer and middle ear spaces. If the eardrum stretches sufficiently, it may rupture, which is more painful. Water entering the middle ear may cause vertigo when the inner ear is cooled. Contaminants in the water may cause infection.	Reversed ear may be caused by the outer ear passage being blocked and the pressure remaining low, while the middle ear pressure increases by equalising with ambient pressure through the eustachian tubes, causing a pressure differential and stretching the eardrum, which may eventually rupture.	The hood should not make an airtight seal over the outside ear opening.; Sealed earplugs should never be worn while diving.
Pressure difference between paranasal sinus and ambient pressure.	Sinus squeeze: Damage to the sinuses usually resulting in pain, and often burst blood vessels and nosebleed.	Obstruction to the sinus ducts leading to pressure differences between the interior of the sinus and the external pressure.	Do not dive with conditions such as the common cold or allergies that cause nasal congestion.
Localised low pressure in the diving mask.	Mask squeeze: Squeeze damage to blood vessels around the eyes.	Caused by local low pressure in the air space inside a diving half-mask. Ambient pressure increase during descent not balanced inside mask air space.	Mask squeeze can be avoided by allowing air into the mask through the nose whenever the pressure difference is noticeable.; A fullface mask will automatically equalise through the demand valve.; Air filled eyes-only goggles can not be equalised and are not suitable for diving.
Reduction of volume of airspace in drysuit.	Loss of buoyancy.; Suit squeeze injury (usually restricted to bruising and minor abrasion) to skin.	Volume of air in a drysuit reduces as pressure increases with depth.; Skin may be pinched by folds in a drysuit as the air inside is compressed.	Modern drysuits have a low pressure air hose connection and valve to inflate the drysuit from the cylinder. Adding sufficient air to maintain the bulk of the undersuit will prevent suit squeeze and stabilize buoyancy of the suit.
Pressure difference between lung gas contents and ambient pressure	Lung squeeze: Lung damage.	Free diving to extreme depth.	It can be avoided by limiting free diving depth to capacity of lungs to compensate, and by training exercises to increase compliance of chest cavity.
Pressure difference between lung gas contents and ambient pressure	Lung squeeze: Lung damage.	Rupture or supply pressure failure of a surface supply hose with simultaneous failure of the non-return valve.	Maintenance and pre-dive tests of non-return valves on the helmet or full face mask.
Helmet squeeze, with the old standard diving dress. (This can not happen with scuba or where there is no rigid pressure-tight helmet)	In severe cases much of the diver's body could be mangled and compacted inside the helmet; however, this requires substantial pressure difference, or by a sudden considerable increase in depth, as when the diver falls off a cliff or wreck and descends faster than the air supply can keep up with the pressure increase.	A non-return valve in the air supply line to the helmet failing (or absent on the earliest models of this type of diving suit), accompanied by a failure of the air compressor (on the surface) to pump enough air into the suit for the gas pressure inside the suit to remain equal to the outside pressure of the water, or a burst air supply hose.	Appropriate maintenance and daily pre-use testing of non-return valves.
Helmet squeeze, with the old standard diving dress. (This can not happen with scuba or where there is no rigid pressure-tight helmet)	In severe cases much of the diver's body could be mangled and compacted inside the helmet; however, this requires substantial pressure difference, or by a sudden considerable increase in depth, as when the diver falls off a cliff or wreck and descends faster than the air supply can keep up with the pressure increase.	A sudden large increase in ambient pressure due to sudden depth increase, when the air supply can not compensate fast enough to prevent compression of the air in the suit.	The squeeze due to depth changes was more likely when the air supply was powered by men. Motorised compressors are usually able to supply air much faster, so an adequate air reservoir on the compressor should prevent this problem.; The diver may be prevented from sinking too deep by minimizing slack in the lifeline or umbilical.; The diver may work at neutral buoyancy when there is a risk of falling off a structure, or may clip on to the structure, but this presents a hazard of entrapment.
Tooth squeeze	Toothache, most often affects divers with preexisting pathology in the oral cavity.	Any gas space inside a tooth due to decay or poor quality fillings or caps may allow tissue inside the tooth to be squeezed into the gap causing pain.	Tooth squeeze may be avoided by ensuring good dental hygiene and that all fillings and caps are free of air spaces.
Suit compression.	Loss of buoyancy may lead to: Uncontrolled descent.; Inability to achieve neutral buoyancy.; Inability to surface due to insufficient buoyancy.; Difficulty in controlling depth and ascent rate. This can be critical when decompression is required, and oxygen-rich breathing gases are used.	Buouyancy loss due to compression of foam neoprene wet or drysuit material.	Use of buoyancy compensator with volume appropriate to expected buoyancy variation during dive.; Use of appropriate ballast weight for dive profile and equipment in use.; Use of inflation system for replacing lost volume in drysuits.; Excessive weighting makes buoyancy control more difficult and loss of control more likely.; Adequate training and practice of buoyancy control skills.

=== Pressure changes during ascent ===
Hazard	Consequences	Cause	Avoidance and prevention
Lung overpressure: Pressure in lungs exceeds ambient pressure.	Pulmonary barotrauma (Lung overexpansion injury)—rupture of lung tissue allowing air to enter tissues, blood vessels, or spaces between or surrounding organs: Pneumothorax: Free air in the pleural cavity, leading to collapsed lung.; Interstitial emphysema: Gas trapped in the spaces between tissues.; Mediastinal emphysema: Gas trapped around the heart.; Subcutaneous emphysema: Free gas under the skin.; Arterial Gas embolism: Air or other breathing gas in the blood stream, causing blockage of small blood vessels.	Failing to maintain an open airway to release expanding air while ascending.	Divers should not hold their breath while ascending after diving with breathing apparatus: The best option is to breathe normally while ascending when possible, and passively exhale during free ascent.; Forced exhalation before starting an emergency free ascent may increase risk of lung overpressure injury.
Sinus overpressure.	Sinus overpressure injury is commonly restricted to rupture of mucous membrane and small blood vessels, but can be more serious and involve bone damage.	Blockage of the sinus's duct, preventing trapped air in a sinus from equalising with the pharynx.	Not diving with nasal congestion, e.g. Hay fever, or the common cold.; Checking before a dive to ensure that sinuses and middle ears will equalise without undue effort.; Systemic decongestants have been used successfully, but may have undesirable side-effects, and there is a risk that they will wear off before surfacing. Topical decongestants do not usually have sufficient lasting effect.
Middle ear overpressure	Injury (reversed ear) of eardrum stretching or bursting outwards due to expansion of air in the middle ear.	Blocked Eustachian tube fails to allow pressure to equalise middle ear with the upper airway.	Not diving with nasal congestion, e.g. Hay fever, or the common cold.; Checking before a dive to ensure that sinuses and middle ears will equalise without undue effort.; Systemic decongestants have been used successfully, but may have undesirable side-effects, and there is a risk that they will wear off before surfacing. Topical decongestants do not usually have sufficient lasting effect.
Overpressure within a cavity in a tooth, usually under a filling or cap.	Tooth squeeze/Toothache, may affect divers with preexisting pathology in the oral cavity.: Tooth pain, loss of fillings, cracking of teeth.	Gas may find its way into a cavity in the tooth or under a filling or cap during a dive and become trapped. During ascent, this gas will exert pressure inside the tooth.	Good dental hygiene, and maintenance of dental repairs to prevent or remove potential gas traps.
Suit and BC expansion	Loss of buoyancy control—uncontrolled ascent.	Expansion of neoprene suit material, gas content of dry suits and buoyancy compensators increasing buoyancy of the diver.	Automatic dump valves in dry suits.; Monitoring of buoyancy on a continuous basis when in mid-water, and manually adjusting volume of buoyancy compensator when necessary.; Appropriate training and practice to develop good buoyancy control skills to suit the equipment in use.; Ability to recover from inversion in dry suit.; Maintaining the minimum air volume for adequate liner bulk maintenance in a dry suit, as this prevents excessive buoyancy shifts. This implies use of the buoyancy compensator for buoyancy control, not the suit.; Minimizing weighting to what is actually necessary, so compensatory air volume is minimized. This reduces the magnitude and rate of buoyancy change with pressure change.
History of heavy smoking	Risk of increased severity of decompression illness	Data from a 2000 analysis of decompression illness records suggest that smokers with DCI tend to present with more severe symptoms than non-smokers.	Don't smoke.

=== Breathing gases at high ambient pressure ===
Hazard	Consequences	Cause	Avoidance and prevention
Medium to long term exposure to high partial pressures (>c1.3 bar) of inert gas (usually N_{2} or He) in the breathing gas.	Decompression sickness ("the bends"): Injury due to gas bubbles expanding in the tissues and causing damage, or gas bubbles in the arterial circulation causing emboli and cutting off blood supply to tissues downstream of the blockage.	Gas dissolved in tissues under pressure during the dive according to Henry's Law coming out of solution and forming bubbles if the ascent and decompression is too fast to allow safe elimination of the gas by diffusion into the capillaries and transport to the lungs where it can diffuse into the respiratory gas. Although rare, decompression sickness is possible in free-diving (breathhold diving) when many deep dives are done in succession. (See also taravana).	Decompress to suit the dive profile and gas mixtures used.; Use appropriate ascent rates and decompression stops.; Oxygen-rich gas mixtures may be used to accelerate decompression.; Use depth control aids to maintain correct decompression depth.; Avoid dehydration and hypothermia.; Maintain cardiovascular fitness.
Short term (immediate onset) exposure to high partial pressure (>c2.4 bar) of nitrogen in the breathing gas:	Nitrogen narcosis: A reversible alteration in consciousness that occurs while diving at depth.; A state similar to alcohol intoxication or nitrous oxide inhalation.; The most dangerous aspects of narcosis are the loss of decision-making ability and focus, and impaired judgement, multi-tasking and coordination.; Other effects include vertigo, and visual or auditory disturbances, exhilaration, giddiness, extreme anxiety, depression, or paranoia, depending on the individual diver.	A high partial pressure of nitrogen in the nerve tissues. (other gases may also have narcotic effect, to varying degrees).: Related to the increased solubility of gases in body tissues at elevated pressure.; Inert gases dissolving in the lipid bilayer of cell membranes may cause narcosis.; Other possibilities include neurotransmitter receptor protein mechanisms.	Use of less narcotic gases to dilute the breathing gas, or; Limit the partial pressure of narcotic gases at maximum depth by limiting the depth of the dive.
Short term (minutes to hours) exposure to high partial pressure (>c1.6 bar) of oxygen in the breathing gas.	Acute oxygen toxicity: Convulsions similar to epileptic seizure. Loss of consciousness may occur with no warning, or may be preceded by any of the following symptoms: Muscle twitching, Tinnitus, Blurred or tunnel vision, Disorientation, Aphasia, Nystagmus, Incoordination.	Breathing gas with too high a partial pressure of oxygen, risk becomes significant at partial pressures exceeding 1.6 bar (partial pressure depends upon proportion of oxygen in the breathing gas, and depth).	Appropriate training before using a rebreather or oxygen enriched gases such as nitrox.; Correct labeling of cylinders containing mixed breathing gases, specifying oxygen fraction and maximum operating depth.; Accurate monitoring of dive depth to ensure that gases are not used below the appropriate maximum operating depth for the mixture.
Long term (hours to days) exposure to moderately raised partial pressure (>0.5 bar) of oxygen in the breathing gas.	Chronic oxygen toxicity: Signs of pulmonary toxicity begin with inflammation of the upper airways.; Temporarily reduced lung capacity.; Acute respiratory distress syndrome.	Breathing gas at too high a partial pressure of oxygen, Risk is significant at a partial pressure in excess of 0.5 atmospheres pressure for long periods and increases with higher partial pressure even for shorter exposures.	Not normally a risk for recreational divers due to short exposures.; Limit use of rich nitrox mixtures and pure oxygen for accelerated decompression.; Limit exposure by calculating Oxygen Toxicity Units for pre-existing and planned exposures and keeping below recommended limits.; Most likely to be encountered in recompression treatment for decompression illness.
Exposure to a high partial pressure(>15 bar) of helium in the breathing gas.	High-pressure nervous syndrome (HPNS):	HPNS has two components: The compression effects may occur when descending below 500 feet (150 m) at rates greater than a few metres per minute, but reduce within a few hours once the pressure has stabilised.; The effects from depth become significant at depths exceeding 1,000 feet (300 m) and remain regardless of the time spent at that depth.	The susceptibility of divers to HPNS varies over a wide range depending on the individual, but has little variation between different dives by the same diver.; Use another diving technique, such as an atmospheric diving suit, submersible or ROV.; Including other gases in the mix, such as nitrogen (creating trimix) or hydrogen to make (hydreliox) suppresses the neurological effects.

== The specific diving environment ==
Hazard	Consequences	Cause	Avoidance and prevention
Exposure to cold water during a dive, and cold environment before or after a dive, wind chill.	Hypothermia: Reduced core temperature, shivering, loss of strength, reduced level of consciousness, loss of consciousness, and eventually death.	Loss of body heat to the water or other surroundings. Water carries heat away far more effectively than air. Evaporative cooling on the surface is also an effective mechanism of heat loss, and can affect divers in wet diving suits while travelling on boats.	Diving suits are available that are suited to a wide range of water temperature down to freezing. The appropriate level of insulation for the conditions will reduce heat loss.; In extreme conditions and when helium-based mixtures are in use as breathing gas, heated suits may be necessary.; On the surface, wind chill can be avoided by staying out of the wind, staying dry, and suitable protective clothing.; Some parts of the body, particularly the head, are more prone to heat loss and insulation of these areas is correspondingly important.
Exposure to cold water during a dive, and cold environment before or after a dive, wind chill.	Nonfreezing Cold Injuries (NFCI).	Exposure of the extremities in water temperatures below 12 °C (53.6 °F).	Hand and Foot Temperature Limits to avoid NFCI: Fully Functional 18 °C (64.4 °F) Non Freezing Cold Injury Threshold < Week.; 12 °C (54 °F) approximately 3 hours.; 8 °C (46.4 °F) for maximum of 30 min.; 6 °C (42.8 °F) immediate rewarming required.; Protection in order of effectiveness: Dry gloves attached to drysuit without wrist seal.; Dry gloves with wrist seal.; Wet suit (neoprene) gloves.; Rubberised cloth or leather gloves.
Exposure to cold water during a dive, and cold environment before or after a dive, wind chill.	Frostbite	Exposure of inadequately perfused skin and extremities to temperatures below freezing.	Prevent excessive heat loss of body parts at risk: Adequate insulation of the diving suit, particularly the gloves and boots.; Prevention of wind chill by use of shelters and additional layers of clothing when out of the water.
Exposure to cold water during a dive, and cold environment before or after a dive, wind chill.	Muscular cramps	Inadequate insulation.; Reduced perfusion to the legs and feet (occasionally hands).	Better insulation and/or suit fit.
Hard corals.	Coral cuts—Infected lacerations of the skin.	Sharp coral skeleton edges lacerating or abrading exposed skin, contaminating the wound with coral tissue and pathogenic microorganisms.	Coral cuts may be prevented by avoiding contact of unprotected skin with coral.; Protective clothing such as wet-suit, dry suit, skin/lycra suit or overalls are effective.
Sharp edges of rock, metal, etc.	Lacerations and abrasions of the skin, possibly deeper wounds.	Contact with sharp edges.	Most cuts may be avoided by wearing protective clothing such as wet-suit, dry suit, skin/lycra suit or overalls.; Avoiding high risk areas such as shipwrecks during strong water movements such as surge or currents is also effective.; Strength and skill in avoiding contact with sharp edges will help, but does not eliminate the risk when water movement is strong.
Stinging hydroids	Stinging skin rash, local swelling and inflammation.	Contact of bare skin with fire coral.	Avoid contact with benthic organisms.; Protective clothing such as exposure suits, lycra skins, or overalls are effective.
Stinging jellyfish	Stinging skin rash, local swelling and inflammation, sometimes extremely painful, occasionally dangerous or even fatal	Some species of jellyfish (free swimming cnidaria) have stinging cells that are toxic to humans, and will inject venom on contact with the skin.	Avoid contact with jellyfish tentacles.; Protective clothing such as exposure suits, lycra skins, or overalls is effective.
Stingrays	A deep puncture or laceration that leaves venom in the wound.	Defensive reaction of a sting ray when disturbed or threatened, by lashing out with the venomous spine on the tail.	Stingrays can usually be avoided by not poking about on the bottom where they may be hiding, partly or completely buried under a thin layer of sand.; The risk is usually greater when wading, when the wader may inadvertently step on a buried ray.; Rays are usually very shy and will usually swim away when approached. Risk of injury may be avoided by not molesting or threatening the animals when seen, and by staying a safe distance from the tail.
Tropical reef environment	Reef rash: General or localised stinging or inflammation of the skin. may include allergic reactions.	A generic term for the various cuts, scrapes, bruises and skin conditions that result from diving in tropical waters. This may include sunburn, mild jellyfish stings, sea lice bites, fire coral inflammation and other skin injuries that a diver may get on exposed skin.	A full-body exposure suit can prevent direct skin to environment contact.
Fish and invertebrates with venomous spines.	Puncture wounds with venom injection. Often extremely painful and may be fatal in rare cases.	Lionfish, stonefish, crown of thorns starfish, some sea urchins in warm seas.	Most of these animals are sedentary and non-aggressive and may be avoided if seen and recognised in time.; The risk is often greater when wading. Some protection is provided by rubber-soled neoprene diving boots, but hard-soled boots are more effective.
Venomous octopus	Local envenomation at site of bite wound. Extremely painful and may result in death.	The Blue ringed octopus may on rare occasions bite a diver.	Found only in parts of the Pacific Ocean from Japan to Australia.; The octopus is unlikely to be aggressive, and is not likely to bite unless handled. However it can be well camouflaged against the reef and difficult to see, so not contacting the reef is the most reliable way to avoid contact.
Sharks	Lacerations by shark teeth can involve deep wounds, loss of tissue and amputation, with major blood loss. In extreme cases death may result.	Attack or investigation by shark with bites. Risk is location, conditions, and species dependent.	Consult location-specific information to determine risk.; Never molest even apparently docile sharks underwater.
Crocodiles	Lacerations and punctures by teeth, brute force tearing of tissues. Possibility of drowning.	Risk factors are proximity or entry to water, and low light. Launching ranges are 4m forwards out of water and 2m above water surface. Running speed is up to 11 km/h.	Found worldwide in tropical seas and fresh water.; Consult local information on risk.; Stay out of waters and surroundings known to be inhabited by crocodiles.
Titan triggerfish		This tropical Indo-Pacific fish is very territorial during breeding season and will attack and bite divers.	Keep a lookout for the fish and move away if they act aggressively. Since his territory and nest is roughly cone-shaped move to the side instead of ascending.
Very large groupers.	Bite wounds, bruising and crushing injuries.	The Giant grouper Epinephelus lanceolatus can grow very big in tropical waters, where protected from attack by sharks. There have been cases of very large groupers trying to swallow humans.	Get local information on risk.; Stay clear of very large specimens.; Do not attempt to feed the fish, they may take more than is offered.
Electric shock	Electrical discharge that will startle and may stun the diver.	Defense mechanism of Electric eel, in some South American fresh waters.	Get local information on risk.; Do not touch the animals if seen.
Electric shock	Electrical discharge that will startle and may stun the diver.	Defense mechanism of Electric ray, in some tropical to warm temperate seas.	Do not touch the animal.
Electric shock	Electrical discharge that will startle and may stun the diver.	It is said that some naval anti-frogman defences use electric shock.	Keep out of armed forces areas.
Powerful ultrasound	Exposure to ultrasound in excess of 120 dB may lead to hearing loss. Exposure in excess of 155 dB may produce heating effects that are harmful to the human body, and it has been calculated that exposures above 180 dB may lead to death.	It is said that some naval anti-frogman defences use powerful ultrasound. Also used for long-range communication with submarines. Most high power sonar is used for submarine detection and target acquisition.	Keep out of armed forces areas.; Avoid large naval ships' anti-submarine warfare sonar.; See Underwater Port Security System.
Water contaminated by infectious aquatic organisms	Weil's disease.	Leptospirosis infection (Weil's disease) is commonly transmitted to humans by allowing water that has been contaminated by animal urine to come in contact with unhealed breaks in the skin, the eyes, or with the mucous membranes. Outside of tropical areas, leptospirosis cases have a relatively distinct seasonality with most of them occurring in spring and autumn.	Avoid diving in contaminated water.; Analyse water before diving if presence of contaminants is suspected, but type and concentration is not known.; If it is necessary, and depending on risk: A watertight drysuit with dry gloves and integral dry hood, and positive pressure full face diving mask will provide acceptable protection in some circumstances.; Surface supplied equipment with heavy duty full environmentally sealed dry suit with integral boots and gloves, and helmet sealed to suit, with either free flow air supply or series exhaust valve system will provide more protection.; Gas reclaim systems can provide the greatest security to ingress of contaminants. The gas need not actually be reclaimed if it is not economically desirable, the systems are used so that there are no potential leaks though underwater exhaust openings.; Protective overalls may be worn over the drysuit to protect it from puncture damage.; Appropriate decontamination procedures may be used after the dive.; The diver should breathe from the diving air supply when surfaced in environments where air quality is uncertain.
Water contaminated by infectious aquatic organisms	Bilharzia (in some warm fresh water)	Schistosomiasis (bilharzia) is a parasitic disease caused by several species of trematodes or "flukes" of the genus Schistosoma. Snails serve as the intermediary agent between mammalian hosts. This disease is most commonly found in Asia, Africa, and South America, especially in areas where the water contains numerous freshwater snails, which may carry the parasite. The parasitic larvae enter through unprotected skin and further mature within organ tissues.
Water contaminated by infectious aquatic organisms	(details to come)	Various bacteria found in sewage
Chemically polluted water	Consequences variable depending on: Identity of pollutant; Concentration of pollutant; Exposure to pollutant; Refer to Materials Safety Data Sheet (MSDS) for identified pollutants.	Water polluted by industrial waste outfalls or by natural sources.
Hydrogen sulfide	Hydrogen sulfide poisoning:	Hydrogen sulfide is associated with sour natural gas, crude oil, anoxic water conditions and sewers (more information needed). hydrogen sulfide is present in some lakes and caves and can also be absorbed through the skin.
Impact with boat or shoreline	Broken bones, bleeding, laceration wounds and other trauma	Colliding with a boat or its propeller.; Wave action on rocky shore.	Use of Surface detection aids or a diving shot to locate and mark surfacing position and warn vessels of the presence of divers.; A safe exit point and alternatives may be planned for taking into account forecasts for weather and tidal conditions.
Abandonment at surface after a boat dive	Diver lost at sea on the surface after a dive, with risk of exposure, drowning and dehydration.	Diver separated from boat cover due to poor visibility at surface or strong underwater currents.; Diver left behind due to inaccurate check by boat crew.; Diver unable to return to unattended boat.	Boat crew may use a positive check system to identify that each diver is on board after a dive.; Divers may carry a yellow flag or surface marker buoy to attract attention.; Divers may carry a personal submersible EPIRB or vhf radio.; Divers may carry a signalling mirror and/or sound signalling device.; Diving from unattended boats only when a safe shore exit is feasible.
Inability to return to shore or to exit the water.	Diver lost at sea after a shore dive.	Big breaking waves make it unsafe to approach the shore.; Currents move the diver away from a safe exit.; Weather conditions make the sea too rough to safely exit.	Local knowledge, good weather forecasts, plan alternative exits.; EPIRB, marker buoy, flares, die markers, signalling light, mirror, whistle or other means of signalling distress and indicating position to rescuers.; Good buoyancy aids and exposure suit to provide protection while rescue is awaited.; Notification before the dive of someone on shore of the expected time of return, so they can notify the rescue organisations if the divers do not return within a reasonable time.
Silt	Sudden loss of underwater visibility (silt out), which can cause disorientation and a diver getting lost under an overhead.	Stirring up silt or other light loose material, either by natural water movement or by diver activity, often due to poor trim and finning skills.	Appropriate trim, buoyancy and propulsion techniques.; Training and skills for diving in zero visibility and silting risk areas.; Use of distance line when it is possible to end up under an overhead.
Entrapment hazards such as nets, lines, kelp, unstable structures or terrain, and confined spaces.	Diver trapped underwater and may run out of breathing gas and drown. Inappropriate response due to panic is possible.	Snagging on lines, nets, wrecks, debris or in caves.: Entrapment by collapse of terrain or structure, either directly or by obstructing the exit route.	Carrying at least one effective line cutting implement, more in high risk areas.; Diving with a buddy who is capable of helping to free the trapped diver and will stay close enough to notice.; Training in wreck diving and cave diving techniques.; Use of low snag equipment configurations (avoid dangling gear and snap hooks that can snag on lines).
Overhead environment (cave, wreck or ice, where direct ascent to the surface is obstructed)	Diver may get lost and be unable to identify the way out, and may run out of breathing gas and drown.; Inappropriate response due to panic is possible.	Getting lost in wrecks and caves or under ice where there is no direct route to the surface, often due to not using a distance line, or losing it in darkness or bad visibility, but sometimes due to the line breaking.	Appropriate training and dive planning.; Correct use of reels, lines and directional markers.; Backup lights.
Differential pressure hazards (Pressure difference other than hydrostatic, causing strong water flow, usually towards the hazard)	Diver may get drawn into moving machinery or trapped against an intake opening, and may be directly injured or unable to escape and may run out of breathing gas and drown.; Inappropriate response due to panic is possible.	Getting too close to propellers, thrusters or intakes on operational vessels, outlets and sluices in dams, locks or culverts, failure of lockout tagout and permit to work systems, Previously unknown or changed flow in caves.	Appropriate training and dive planning.; Correct use of lockout-tagout and permit to work systems; Restricted length of lifeline or umbilical; Use of temporary or permanent safety barrier
Strong currents or surge	Impact against the bottom terrain or underwater structures, which can dislodge equipment such as mask or DV, roll off a cylinder valve, snag and damage equipment or cause impact trauma to the diver. Severity can vary from annoyance to fatal.; It is also possible to get wedged into a small gap and trapped, or caught up on nets or lines in the water.; In an overhead environment the diver may be unable to get back against a strong current.; Disorientation or vertigo caused by tumbling in strong eddies or vortices	Strong water movement carrying the diver along and into contact with rigid objects fixed in place.; Strong water movement creating so much drag on the diver that progress upcurrent is severely restricted.; Strong water movement past an obstacle may throw off vortices due to flow instability	Strong currents and surge may often be avoided by planning the time of the dive.; Divers may stay a safe distance from the bottom terrain during drift dives.; Drift divers may tow a surface marker buoy to identify their positions to the boat.
Breaking waves (surf)	Impact injury and damage to equipment.; Disorientation.; Loss of equipment, temporary loss of breathing gas.	Uncontrolled transportation by surf surge onto rocks or other hard obstacles.; Tumbling in breaking wave causing vertigo.; Strong turbulence in breaking wave may pull equipment from diver, particularly mask and demand valve, occasionally fins.	Avoidance of strong surf transits.; Minimising time in surf zone.; Secure attachment of equipment.; Protection of mask and demand valve security by holding them in place in high turbulence.
Low visibility and darkness. (in conjunction with other hazards)	Inability to read instruments to monitor depth, time, ascent rate, decompression schedule, gas pressure, and to navigate. These are not dangerous in themselves, but may result in the diver getting lost, swimming into an entrapment hazard or under an overhang, violating a decompression obligation, or running out of breathing gas.	Lack of light or absorption of light by turbidity.	A dive light can provide light if the visibility is sufficient.; In zero visibility special precautions must be taken.; It is usually preferable to use surface-supplied equipment with voice communications, as the diver can not get lost, and the surface team can monitor depth, time, breathing gas and decompression obligations.; Navigation and work must be done by feel.
High altitude	Increased risk of decompression sickness—Reduced ambient pressure can induce bubble formation or growth in saturated tissues.	Diving at altitude.	Acclimatisation at altitude before diving.; Use of decompression schedules designed for altitude diving.
High altitude	Increased risk of decompression sickness—Reduced ambient pressure can induce bubble formation or growth in saturated tissues.	Ascent to altitude after diving, including: Flying in pressurised aircraft.; Flying in unpressurised aircraft.; Ascent by road or rail to significantly higher altitude.	Surface interval appropriate to the planned change in altitude.

== Pre-existing physiological and psychological conditions in the diver ==
Hazard	Consequences	Cause	Avoidance and prevention
Heart disease	Heart attack, with high risk of death as direct consequence, or by drowning as indirect consequence.; Angina with severe pain and severely reduced physical strength and endurance, and reduced situational awareness, which increase the risk of further deterioration of the incident	Exertion beyond the capacity of the unhealthy heart.	Periodical medical examination for diving fitness, and discussion of medical history with provider.; Stress ECG when indicated by medical examination.; Maintaining good cardio-vascular fitness.; Use of Nitrox may decrease risk.
Patent foramen ovale (PFO)	Possibility of venous gas bubbles shunting into arterial circulation and causing emboli	Otherwise low-risk venous gas bubbles formed during decompression may shunt through PFO during anomalous pressure differential episode such as coughing, Valsalva manoeuver, or exertion while holding the breath.	Screening for PFO for high risk divers; Conservative decompression and ascent; Avoidance of exercise which is likely to induce shunting during ascent
Epilepsy	Loss of consciousness and inability to remain alert and actively control activity. Likely to lead to drowning in Scuba divers.	Epileptic seizure.	Divers with a history of epilepsy are generally considered unfit for diving due to the unacceptable risk associated with an underwater seizure.
Diabetes	(to be added)	(to be added)	(to be added)
Asthma	Difficulty in breathing, particularly difficulty in exhaling adequately during ascent, with reduced physical work capacity, can seriously reduce ability to cope with a relatively minor difficulty and precipitate an emergency.	constriction of lung passages, increasing work of breathing.	(to be added)
Trait anxiety	Panic, and associated sub-optimal coping behaviour.	Higher susceptibility to panic under high stress	Overlearning of critical skills.; Avoidance of high stress dive plans.
Dehydration	Increased risk of decompression sickness; Muscular cramps	Overheating and sweating before dive.; Drinking diuretic beverages before diving.; Immersion effects of diving.	Ensure adequate hydration before diving.; Rehydrate during dives if they are several hours long.; Rehydrate after dives.
Excessive hydration, hypertension	Swimming-induced pulmonary edema	Drinking too much prior to dive, Pre-existing hypertension, Both	Avoid overhydration, particularly with high blood pressure
Fatigue	Reduced situational awareness, reduced ability to respond appropriately to emergencies	Lack of sleep, excessive exertion prior to dive.	(To be added)
Compromised physical fitness	Reduced ability to respond effectively to emergencies; Muscular cramps	Illness, lifestyle, lack of exercise.	Training and exercise, particularly swimming and finning exercise using diving equipment

== Diver behaviour and competence ==
Hazard	Consequences	Cause	Avoidance and prevention
Inadequate learning of critical safety skills.	Inability to deal with minor incidents, which consequently may develop into major incidents.	Inadequate demonstration and assessment of skills by instructor.; Ineffective skills taught, due to inappropriate training standard, or misinterpretation of training standard.; Insufficient correct repetition of skills during training.	Quality assurance by training agency
Inadequate practical competence in critical safety skills.	Inability to deal with minor incidents, which consequently may develop into major incidents.	Insufficient practice of skills during training.; Insufficient practice of skills after training.	Clear standards for competence in assessment criteria of training programme.; Quality assurance by training agency.; Post training practice of vital skills by the diver.; Periodical re-assessment of skills by a competent assessor.
Overconfidence.	Diving in conditions beyond the diver's competence, with high risk of accident due to inability to deal with known environmental hazards.	Over-optimistic self-assessment of personal competence by the diver.; Insufficient information due to inadequate training.	Objective assessment and accurate feedback during training.; Realistic training standards and competence level descriptions.
Inadequate strength or fitness for the conditions	Inability to compensate for difficult conditions even though well versed at the required skills.; Over-exertion, overtiredness, stress injuries or exhaustion.	Underestimating severity of conditions.; Overestimating fitness and strength.; Conditions deteriorate during the dive.; Excessive task loading.; Use of equipment that requires greater exertion than the diver can produce.	Experience and familiarity with local conditions.; Use of weather and tide forecasts when planning dives.; Maintaining fitness to dive by adequate exercise.; Use of equipment and techniques that reduce physical exertion required.; Gradual buildup of task-loading to develop appropriate skills and fitness.; Training with equipment in benign conditions before using in severe conditions.
Peer pressure	Inability to deal with reasonably predictable incidents in a dive.	Divers may be pressurised into undertaking dives beyond their competence or fitness.; Divers may be pressurised into diving with unsuitable buddies, often by dive professionals who should know better.	Objective and accurate knowledge of the diver's capabilities.; Recognising and accepting responsibility for possible consequences of exerting or submitting to peer pressure.
Diving with an incompetent buddy	Injury or death while attempting to deal with a problem caused by the buddy.	The buddy may get into difficulty due to inattention or incompetence, and require a rescue that is hazardous to the rescuer.; The buddy may get into difficulty and mishandle the situation or panic, creating an incident that is hazardous to both divers.	Diving with a buddy is known to be competent and who can be trusted to behave responsibly.; Training to deal with emergencies and rescue.; Carrying equipment to be independent of the buddy in most emergencies.; In some circumstances it may be safer to dive without a buddy.
Overweighting	Difficulty in neutralising and controlling buoyancy.: Uncontrolled descent.; Inability to establish neutral buoyancy.; Inefficient swimming.; High gas consumption.; Poor trim.; Kicking up silt.; Difficulty in ascent; Inability to control depth accurately for decompression	Carrying more weight than needed. Recreational divers do not usually need more weight than is needed to remain slightly negative after using all the gas carried. Professional divers may need to be heavy at the bottom to provide stability to work.	Establish and use the correct amount of weight for the circumstances of the dive, taking into account: Density of water (sea or fresh).; Buoyancy of equipment (mainly exposure suit).; Buoyancy change of cylinders as gas is used up.; Tasks of the dive.; Capacity of buoyancy compensator to neutralise buoyancy at depth and provide positive buoyancy at the surface.; Use surface supply equipment or a lifeline if it is necessary to dive heavy.
Underweighting	Difficulty in neutralising and controlling buoyancy.: Inability to achieve neutral buoyancy, particularly at decompression stops.	Not carrying sufficient weight. Divers need to be able to remain neutral at 3m depth at the end of a dive when the gas has been used up.	Establish and use the correct amount of weight for the circumstances of the dive, taking into account: Density of water (sea or fresh).; Buoyancy of equipment (mainly exposure suit).; Buoyancy change of cylinders as gas is used up.; Tasks of the dive.; Capacity of buoyancy compensator to neutralise buoyancy at depth and provide positive buoyancy at the surface.; Use surface supply equipment or a lifeline if it is necessary to dive heavy.
Diving under the influence of drugs or alcohol, or with a hangover	Inappropriate or delayed response to contingencies.; reduced ability to deal timeously with problems, leading to greater risk of developing into an accident.; Increased risk of hypothermia.; Increased risk of decompression sickness.	Use of drugs that alter mental state or physiological responses to environmental conditions.	Avoid use of substances that are known or suspected to reduce the ability to respond appropriately to contingencies.
Use of inappropriate equipment and/or configuration	Muscular cramps	Use of fins that are too large or stiff for the diver	Exercise to develop skills and fitness appropriate to the fins chosen; Use softer or smaller bladed fins (this may compromise speed and/or maneuverability)
Use of inappropriate equipment and/or configuration	Lower back pain	Use of heavy weightbelts for scuba diving	Use of integrated weight systems, which support the weights directly by the buoyancy compensator; Different distribution of weights - some weight transferred to the harness, BCD, cylinder or backplate; Avoiding excessive weighting
Inappropriate attitude towards safety	Wilful or negligent violation of procedures leading to avoidable incidents	Psychological and competence problems	Background checks

== Failure of diving equipment other than breathing apparatus ==
Hazard	Consequences	Cause	Avoidance and prevention
Ballast weight loss	Possible inability to establish neutral buoyancy leading to uncontrolled ascent	Loss of diving weights.	Inspection of weight belt buckle or weight pocket clips for good condition and correct function before dive.; Use of correct length weight belt.; Use weight harness or integrated weight system if weight belts tend to slide over hips and fall off.; Carry weights in secure method, which can not easily be accidentally released.; Carry the amount of weight appropriate for regaining neutral buoyancy on a releasable system, and the rest securely attached to the harness.
Water ingress into dry suit, and associated loss of air from dry suit.	Insulation loss, accelerated loss of body heat, potentially leading to hypothermia.; Buoyancy loss - potential inability to establish neutral or positive buoyancy, and difficulty or inability to ascend.	Catastrophic leak in dry suit: Zipper bursting.; Tear of latex neck seal.	Maintenance and pre-use inspection of dry suit zip and seals.; Use of a dry suit undergarment that retains moderate insulation properties when flooded (e.g. Thinsulate B).; Use of a drysuit material having significant inherent insulation properties (e.g. foam neoprene).; Training and practice of skills for recovery from this situation.; Use of a buoyancy compensator with sufficient volume to compensate for the suit buoyancy loss.; Use of a lifeline with a surface tender.; Sufficient ballast weight ditchable to recover neutral buoyancy at depth.; Use of a DSMB or surface marker buoy with sufficient volume to compensate for loss of buoyancy.
Drysuit blow-up	Uncontrolled ascent with possible decompression problems	Inflation valve jammed open.	Use of low flow rate inflator hose connections.; Training and competence at emergency procedures for inflation valve failure.
Loss of propulsion, maneuvering control and mobility	Inability to swim against current.; Inability to exit overhead environment before running out of gas.	Loss of swimfin(s). Most often due to strap or strap connector failure.	Pre-use inspection of straps and strap connectors.; Practice skill of finning with one fin.; Spare fin strap in emergency spares for team.; Replace original straps with more reliable type.
Loss of mask	Inability to focus vision underwater: High level of stress.; Inability to read instruments	Failure of mask strap or buckle.: Broken lens/faceplate due to impact with hard object.; Mask knocked off and lost	Inspection of the mask and strap before use.; Hold mask in place with hand.; Practice diving with no mask.; Spare mask in emergency spares for team.; Use of full face mask that is more securely attached to the head and tethered by the hose.
Buoyancy compensator blow-up. (uncontrolled inflation)	Uncontrolled ascent with possible decompression problems	Inflation valve stuck open.	Inspection and testing of inflator mechanism before use.; Appropriate maintenance after use.; Training and practice of skills to control situation.; Use of buoyancy compensator with moderate volume.
Uncontrollable loss of air from buoyancy compensator	Inability to achieve neutral or positive buoyancy, and potential difficulty or inability to make controlled ascent or to ascend at all.	Catastrophic leak in buoyancy compensator: Loss of manifold fitting.; Corrugated hose failure.; Torn bladder.	Maintenance and inspection of BC before use.; Use of drysuit as emergency buoyancy control device; Use of reel and DSMB of sufficient volume as shotline and buoyancy aid for ascent.; Use of lifeline and surface tender.; Use of double bladder buoyancy compensator.; Ditching of sufficient weights to allow ascent.
Blunt edged cutting tool	Inability to cut free from entanglement, possibly resulting in drowning.	Poor maintenance and pre-dive inspection procedures.	Inspect and test cutting edge periodically; Sharpen or replace tool when blunt
Hot water suit heating system failure	Inability to regulate diver body temperature, leading to hypothermia or scalding	Umbilical damage, heater malfunctions	Return to bell, Switch to backup system

== Hazards of the dive task and special equipment ==
Hazards specific to special purpose underwater tools should be described in the article for the tool, but may be added here.

-
Hazard	Consequences	Cause	Avoidance and prevention
Carrying tools (in general) in midwater and at the surface.	Buoyancy problems due to weight of tools—Inability to achieve neutral buoyancy for ascent and positive buoyancy on surface.: Increased risk of drowning.; difficulty in controlling ascent rate.; Risk of losing tools if they must be abandoned.	Carrying an excessive weight of tools.	Tools may be lifted and lowered to the worksite using a rope.; Tools may be returned to the surface using a lift bag and a surface marker buoy in case the bag sinks.; Surface supplied divers may be pulled up by the tender or lifted on the diving stage or bell.
Lifting bags	Uncontrolled ascent of diver.	Snagging on lift bag as it begins ascent, and being dragged up with it.	Precautions can be taken to reduce risk if diver snagging on bag or load. These include the use of a rigid extension pipe to fill parachute-style bags, allowing the diver to remain at a safe distance.
Lifting bags	Loss of breathing gas.	Using up breathing air to fill lift bag.	Use of an independent air cylinder dedicated to bag filling, rather than filling from the breathing gas cylinder(s).; Use of surface supplied air to fill bags.
Lifting bags	Impact of falling objects.; Loss of lift bag and cargo.; Damage to lift bag, cargo or other equipment.	Runaway lift(bag): Lift bag broaching at surface or leaking, losing gas and sinking on top of divers.; Lift bag broaching at surface or leaking and sinking at unknown position.; Lift bag surfacing under vessel or structure and snagging on projection that punctures bag, or fouling propeller or rudder, etc.; Poor rigging causing damage to bag or cargo.	Marking lift bag or load with a surface marker buoy before lifting.; Ensuring that lift takes place when surface vessels and structures are clear of the area.; Buoyant assisted lifting, where the lift bag is insufficient volume to lift the load without assistance from a crane or winch.; Staged lifting, where the load is lifted in stages, a short distance at a time.; Adequate training and use of suitable rigging equipment and lift bag size and style. Attachment to suitable lift points, taking trim and stability into account.
Lifting, moving, aligning and lowering heavy objects	Crushing trauma	Getting caught in pinch points between objects with great inertia and relative movement	Use appropriate tools, rigging, PPE, and procedures: deadman anchors and tie-backs to limit movement; pullers, levers and guide-bars to align object; avoid getting any part of the body between or under heavy objects; maintain clear communications; use of helmet video or observation ROV can help remote operators understand the underwater scenario

== The dive platform and support equipment ==
Hazard	Consequences	Cause	Avoidance and prevention
Anchoring patterns	Getting caught under catenary sag causing entrapment and/or crushing trauma	Diving in close vicinity to mooring chain in a seaway or wind. Chain lifting under tension and dropping on diver in pinch zone	Physical restraint from entering danger zone by way of limited umbilical length and underwater tending.; Remain above chain at all times when near pinch zone if necessary to work in the area.; Avoid diving near chains when weather conditions are likely to cause lifting.; Avoid diving near chains in low visibility.
Thrusters on dynamically positioned diving support vessels	Diver sucked into water flow through thruster, causing physical trauma, entanglement, umbilical or other life support damage	Pressure differences cause diver or equipment to be entrained in water flow towards the hazard	Physical restraint from entering danger zone by way of limited umbilical length and underwater tending from bell, stage, or other points.
Dynamic positioning runout	Impact with obstacles, trauma, life support system damage	Bell or stage and divers dragged away from worksite by vessel movement	Multiple redundancy of critical components, and DP status warnings as system reliability degrades
Live-boating from small craft (too small for stage or bell operations)	Impact with vessel hull or propellers, entanglement of diver's umbilical or lifeline with propellers, thrusters, or other appendages	Uncontrolled relative motion between vessel and diver or attached equipment in close proximity.	Use scuba without a lifeline where live-boating is essential.: A surface marker buoy can be used to monitor the position of the diver; Through-water systems if voice communications required.; Diver ascends at shotline or decompression buoy while vessel keeps clear; Vessel only approaches diver on surface when visible to skipper; Engines disengaged when diver in water alongside
Bells and stages	Crushing trauma, entrapment	Diver caught between bell or stage and obstacle on bottom or side of dive platform	Keep bell or stage shallower than work area and local obstacles; Heave compensation in launch and recovery system winch; Handholds on stage within envelope of fender bars and basket; Bell stage under closed bell to keep bottom airlock hatchway area clear

== See also ==
- Alternobaric vertigo – Dizziness resulting from unequal pressures in the middle ears
- Cave diving – Diving in water-filled caves
- Freediving blackout – Loss of consciousness caused by cerebral hypoxia towards the end of a breath-hold dive
- Diver rescue – Rescue of a distressed or incapacitated diver
- Diver training – Processes to develop the skills and knowledge to dive safely underwater
- Divers Alert Network – Group for improving diving safety
- Diving equipment – Equipment used to facilitate underwater diving
- Diving hazards – Agents and situations that pose a threat to the underwater diver
- Diving safety – Risk management of underwater diving activities
- Hazard – Situation or object that can cause harm
- Human factors in diving safety
- Risk assessment – Estimation of risk associated with exposure to a given set of hazards
- Rubicon Foundation – American non-profit foundation
- Task loading – Relationship between operator capacity and the accumulated activities that must be done
- Taravana – Decompression sickness caused by breath-hold diving
- Wreck diving – Recreational diving on wrecks
