= Divers diseases =

Divers diseases or Divers disease can mean:

- In the King James translation of the Bible, and similar older literature, "various diseases"; compare "diverse"
- See Diving hazards and precautions
- Decompression sickness, or “divers’ disease”
