= Taravana =

Decompression sickness caused by breath-hold diving

Taravana, or Taravana syndrome is a disease originally recorded among Polynesian island natives and also found among others who habitually dive deep without breathing apparatus many times in close succession, usually for food or pearls. These free-divers may make 40 to 60 dives a day, each of 30 or 40 metres (100 to 140 feet).

== Classification ==
Taravana appears to be a form of neurological decompression sickness. The usual symptoms are vertigo, nausea, lethargy, paralysis and death. Scans have confirmed that injury is to the brain.

== Presentation ==
Presentation is usually rapid onset of partial paralysis, visual and hearing problems and difficulties with speech. Occasionally loss of consciousness or death have been recorded.

== Causes and mechanism ==
Taravana is defined as a consequence of multiple repetitive relatively deep breathhold dives, and is considered likely to be due to the formation of nitrogen bubbles in the central nervous system or in the blood, later lodging in the CNS. A fast rate of ascent and short surface interval are thought to be risk factors. There is also a suggestion that blood pooling in the pulmonary circulation due to compression of the lung air content may increase solution of nitrogen into that part of the blood while at depth, which may then be rapidly distributed to the central nervous system at high concentration during ascent, aggravated by a fast ascent rate encouraging bubble formation and growth while still in the systemic arterial circulation.

== Diagnosis ==
History of multiple deep breath-hold dives followed by the typical symptoms. Some symptoms of middle and inner ear barotrauma may be confused, but these are usually accompanied by pain or discomfort in at least one ear.

== Etymology ==
The word taravana is Tuamotu Polynesian for "to fall crazily".

Taravana is also used to describe someone who is "crazy because of the sea".

== History ==
The syndrome was first described in 1956 by a Dr Truc, who had observed neurological disorders in pearl shell divers in the Tuamotu Islands in French Polynesia. He used the term taravana, meaning "to fall mad", and suggested that it was a form of cerebral decompression sickness.

== Treatment ==
There is no definitive treatment due to lack of reliable case records, but as the condition is hypothesized to be a form of decompression sickness, the available recommendations are to treat it in the same way depending on severity. Oxygen administration at the highest practicable concentration and referral for hyperbaric oxygen treatment has been suggested.

== Prevention ==
In the absence of better information, there have been recommendations to use a surface interval of at least three times the duration of the dive.

== Epidemiology ==
The population at risk are those with the greatest capacity for long and deep breath-hold diving, and who make repetitive breath-hold dives with short surface intervals. This population typically dives to hunt and gather in relatively deep water, as these activities depend on maximising bottom time.

== Research ==
Research has shown significant intracardiac bubbling after repetitive breath-hold dives, which supports the hypothesis of a form of decompression sickness, but the current decompression models for ambient pressure diving with breathing apparatus do not reliably predict risk.
