= Swimming-induced pulmonary edema =

Body fluid leakage in the lungs while swimming

- Other names: Swimming-induced pulmonary oedema, pulmonary oedema of immersion
- Specialty: Pulmonology

Swimming induced pulmonary edema (SIPE), also known as immersion pulmonary edema, is a life threatening condition that occurs when fluids from the blood leak abnormally from the small vessels of the lung (pulmonary capillaries) into the airspaces (alveoli).

SIPE usually occurs during exertion in conditions of water immersion, such as swimming and diving. With the recent surge in popularity of triathlons and swimming in open water events there has been an increasing incidence of SIPE. It has been reported in scuba divers, apnea (breath hold) free-diving competitors, combat swimmers, and triathletes. The causes are incompletely understood as of 2010. Some authors believe that SIPE may be the leading cause of death among recreational scuba divers, but there is insufficient evidence at present.

== Signs and symptoms ==
As with other forms of pulmonary edema, the hallmark of SIPE is a cough which may lead to frothy or blood-tinged sputum. Symptoms include:

- Shortness of breath out of proportion to effort being expended. Rapid, heavy or uneven breathing, or uncontrollable coughing.
- Crackles, rattling or 'junky' feelings deep in the chest associated with breathing effort – usually progressively worsening with increasing shortness of breath and may be cause for a panic attack
- Cough, usually distressing and productive or not of a little pink, frothy or blood-tinged sputum (hemoptysis)
- The wetsuit may feel as though it is hindering breathing ability.
- The diver feels that their breathing equipment is not working properly, with a high work of breathing, even though later tests indicate that the equipment was working correctly. A diver switching their demand valves, or using a buddy's air supply, or repeatedly purging a rebreather may indicate the onset of SIPE, particularly if there is an adequate supply pressure, and may signal that they are out of gas, or reject a working alternative gas supply
- A diver may have difficulty breathing at the surface.
- Confusion or apparently irrational behaviour.

== Risk factors ==
It has been described in scuba divers, long-distance swimmers, and breath-hold divers.

- Preexisting cardiac disease and high blood pressure Hypertension correlates with greater increases in peripheral vasoconstriction on cold exposure. Combined with diastolic dysfunction due to hypertrophy of left ventricular walls causes high risk.
- Immersion in cold water. Immersion in cold water increases peripheral vasoconstriction and thereby increases afterload on the left ventricle. It probably also further increases preload.
- Stress or exertion during immersion. Stress and exertion increase cardiac work, induce catecholamine release and increase cardiac filling pressures.
- Female sex
- Antiplatelet agents such as aspirin or fish oil
- Excessive pre-hydration before immersion
- Negative pressure inspiration when diving. Use of a snorkel and some types of scuba equipment may cause a negative pressure difference between the air-source and lung centroid, which will cause a greater leakage of fluid into the alveoli.

== Mechanism ==
Immersion causes increased external hydrostatic pressure, leading to redistribution of blood from the periphery to the chest, which increases cardiac filling pressures and stroke volume, and also reduces total lung capacity. There is a movement of fluid from the alveolar capillaries into the alveoli and extravascular lung tissues, which increases with time, and is normal in healthy humans when immersed. This is normally counteracted by the release of BNP which causes sodium and water excretion through the kidneys. This natriuresis is slow, so lung water increase is to some extent normal, but in susceptible people a higher rate of accumulation produces symptoms of SIPE

The alveoli of the lungs fill with edema fluid, causing dyspnoea, cough and frothy or bloodstained sputum. Gas exchange is affected, and as hypoxia increases there may be a loss of consciousness. Oxygenation in divers may be affected by breathing gas mix and partial pressure reduction due to ascent. In severe cases hypoxia may cause cardiac arrest and death. Research continues into the various factors causing IPO.

Possible aggravating factors include:

- Cold water may cause peripheral vasoconstriction and other neuro-humoral changes that contribute to central shift of the blood volume
- Wetsuits may add additional extrinsic compression to the extremities.
- Increased pressure somewhere in the pulmonary circulation (pulmonary artery hypertension, left heart diastolic dysfunction) leads to increased pressure gradient across the pulmonary capillaries
- Capillary stress from oxidative or physical injury leads to breach

SIPE is believed to arise from some combinations of these factors, which overwhelms the ability of the body to compensate, and leads to alveolar flooding.

== Diagnosis ==
Acute onset of breathing problems caused by fluid accumulation in lung extravascular spaces induced by immersion, usually in cold water, often with intense physical exertion. Symptoms reported developed during physical activity and usually include dyspnoea/shortness of breath and a cough, often haemoptysis, occasionally chest tightness, chest pain or confusion. Auscultation shows crackles or wheezing. Oxygen saturation usually shows hypoxemia. In most cases chest radiological examination shows signs of pulmonary edema, but a significant minority have a normal initial chest X-Ray.

Rapid resolution of initial signs and symptoms within 48 hours is typical. Symptoms usually resolve spontaneously after the physiologic environment has been normalised by removal from immersion to a warm environment, with supportive treatment.

== Prevention ==
- Management of hypertension is likely to be important for hypertensive athletes. ACE inhibitors (particularly angiotensin II receptor antagonists) may be effective antihypertensive medications in this setting given their effect on diastolic relaxation, but rationale is theoretical and evidence of SIPE-related benefit is anecdotal.
- Avoidance of excessive pre-swim hydration is advisable
- Nifedipine or sildenafil could theoretically be beneficial due to their ability to modify pulmonary artery pressure, but any use for SIPE is investigational and these agents are not approved for this use.

== Management ==
Management has generally been reported to be conservative, though deaths have been reported.

- Removal from water immediately reverses the hydrostatic effect of immersion and reduces negative filling pressures and kept still, sitting in an upright position if they are conscious, which minimises exertion while encouraging return of fluids to the lower extremities.
- Observation
- Kept warm, to reduce peripheral vasoconstriction
- High percentage Oxygen
- Diuretics, vasodilators, and if necessary, mechanical ventilation,
- Episodes are generally self-limiting in the absence of other medical problems

== Prognosis ==
The majority of cases rapidly resolve symptoms within 48 hours. There is a significant risk of further episodes under similar conditions. Investigation for other cardiac problems is indicated. In some cases a medical condition predisposing to SIPE can be corrected, and in some other cases divers who have had SIPE have resumed diving against medical advice.

== Epidemiology ==
SIPE is estimated to occur in 1-2% of competitive open-water swimmers, with 1.4% of triathletes, 1.8% of combat swimmers and 1.1% of divers and swimmers reported in the literature. Fatal cases can be mistaken for drowning because in both SIPE and drowning the lungs are heavy and filled with fluid, so post mortem findings may be similar. Consequently, most information about this condition comes from survivors and the true incidence is uncertain and likely to be underreported.

== Research ==
Most of the medical literature on the topic comes from case series in military populations and divers, and an epidemiological study in triathletes. A recent experimental study showed increased pulmonary artery pressure with cold water immersion, but this was done in normal subjects rather than in people with a history of SIPE. A study in SIPE-susceptible individuals during submersion in cold water showed that pulmonary artery and pulmonary artery wedge pressures were higher than in non-susceptible people. These pressures were reduced by Sildenafil. SIPE may also be a cause of death during triathlons.
