= Outline of underwater diving =

Overview of and topical guide to underwater diving

The following outline is provided as an overview of and topical guide to underwater diving:

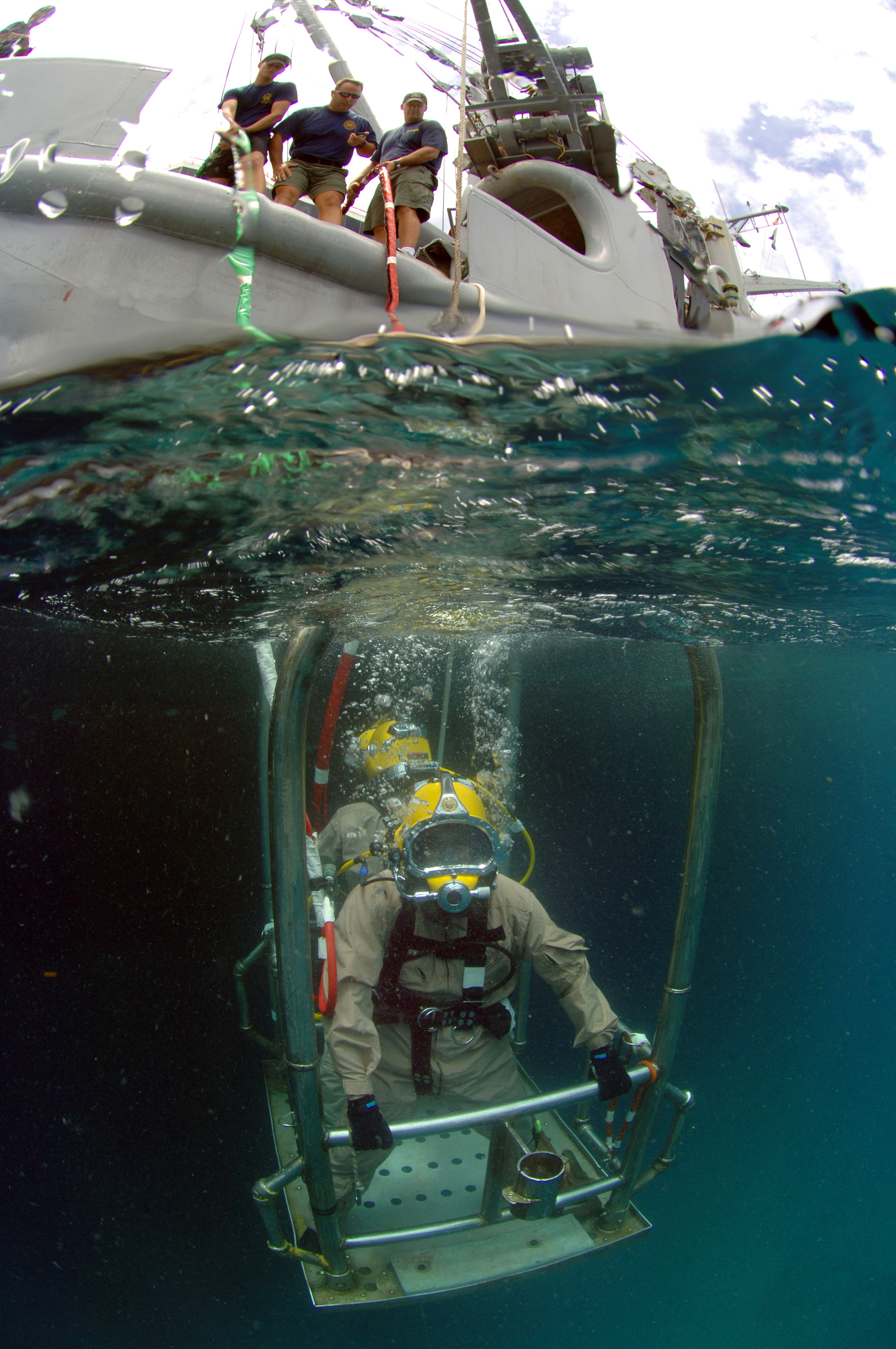
Surface-supplied divers riding a stage to the underwater workplace

Underwater diving – as a human activity, is the practice of descending below the water's surface to interact with the environment.

== What type of activity is underwater diving? ==
Underwater diving can be described as all of the following:

- A human activity – intentional, purposive, conscious and subjectively meaningful sequence of actions. Underwater diving is practiced as part of an occupation, or for recreation, where the practitioner submerges below the surface of the water or other liquid for a period which may range between seconds to the order of a day at a time, either exposed to the ambient pressure or isolated by a pressure resistant suit, to interact with the underwater environment for pleasure, competitive sport, or as a means to reach a work site for profit or in the pursuit of knowledge, and may use no equipment at all, or a wide range of equipment which may include breathing apparatus, environmental protective clothing, aids to vision, communication, propulsion, maneuverability, buoyancy and safety equipment, and tools for the task at hand.

== Diving activity, by type ==
=== Modes of underwater diving ===
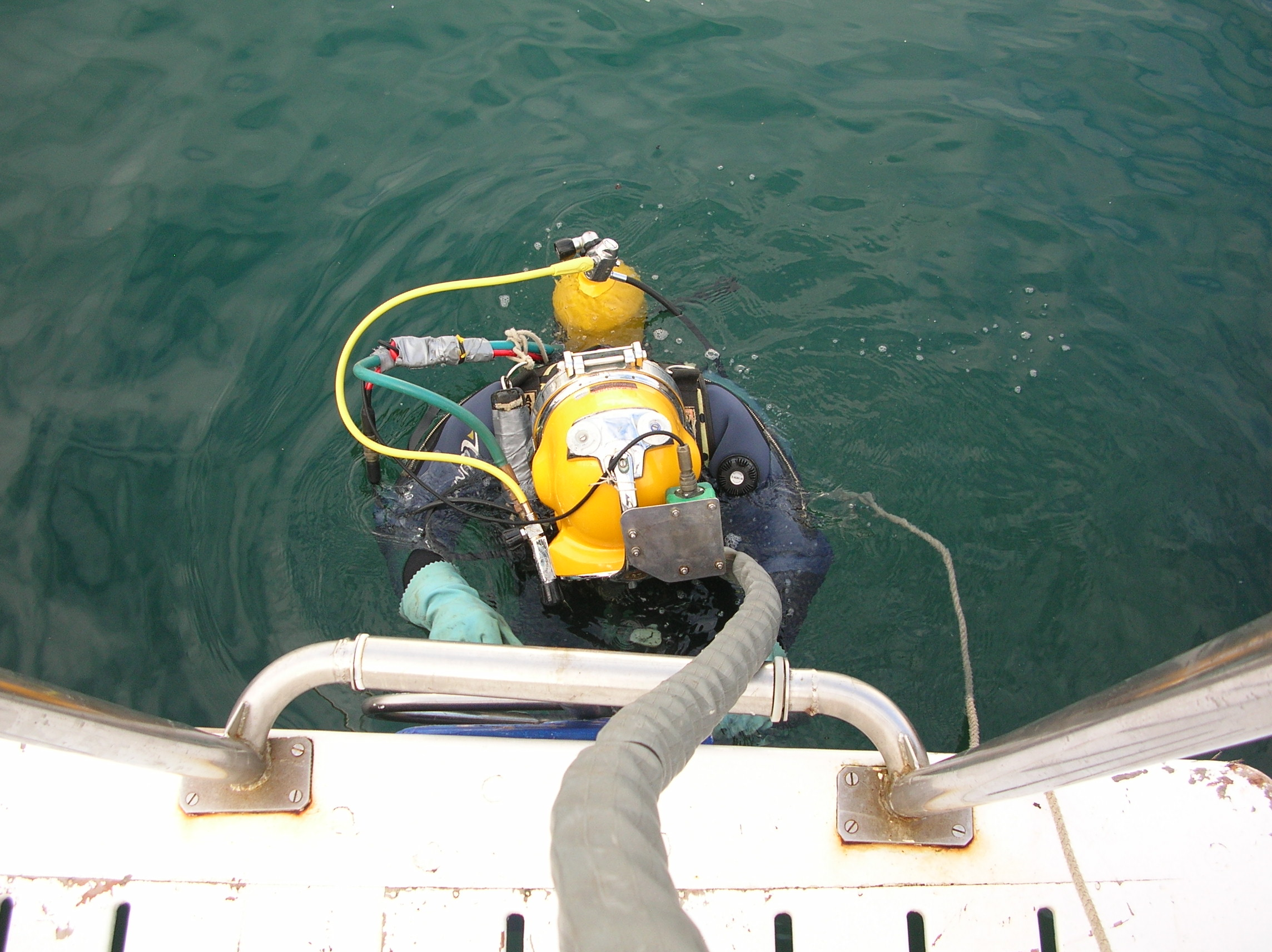
Surface-supplied diver with helmet, bailout set and umbilical cable

There are several modes of diving distinguished by the equipment and procedures used:

- Ambient pressure diving – Underwater diving where the diver is exposed to the ambient pressure
  - Freediving – Underwater diving without breathing apparatus
  - Scuba diving – Swimming underwater, breathing gas carried by the diver
    - Open-circuit scuba diving – Self contained diving where gas is exhaled directly to the surroundings
    - Rebreather diving – Underwater diving using self contained breathing gas recycling apparatus
  - Surface-supplied diving – Underwater diving breathing gas supplied from the surface
    - Surface oriented diving – Underwater diving in which the diver starts and finishes at surface pressure
      - Air-line diving – Basic mode of surface-supplied underwater diving
      - Hookah diving – Underwater diving using a basic air hose from the surface
      - Compressor diving – Crude mode of surface-supplied air diving
      - Bell bounce diving, also known as transfer under pressure diving – Surface oriented diving using a closed bell
    - Saturation diving – Diving mode and decompression technique
- Atmospheric pressure diving – Diving in an articulated pressure resistant anthropomorphic housing
- Unmanned diving – Underwater diving by autonomous or remotely operated vehicles

=== Diving skills and procedures ===
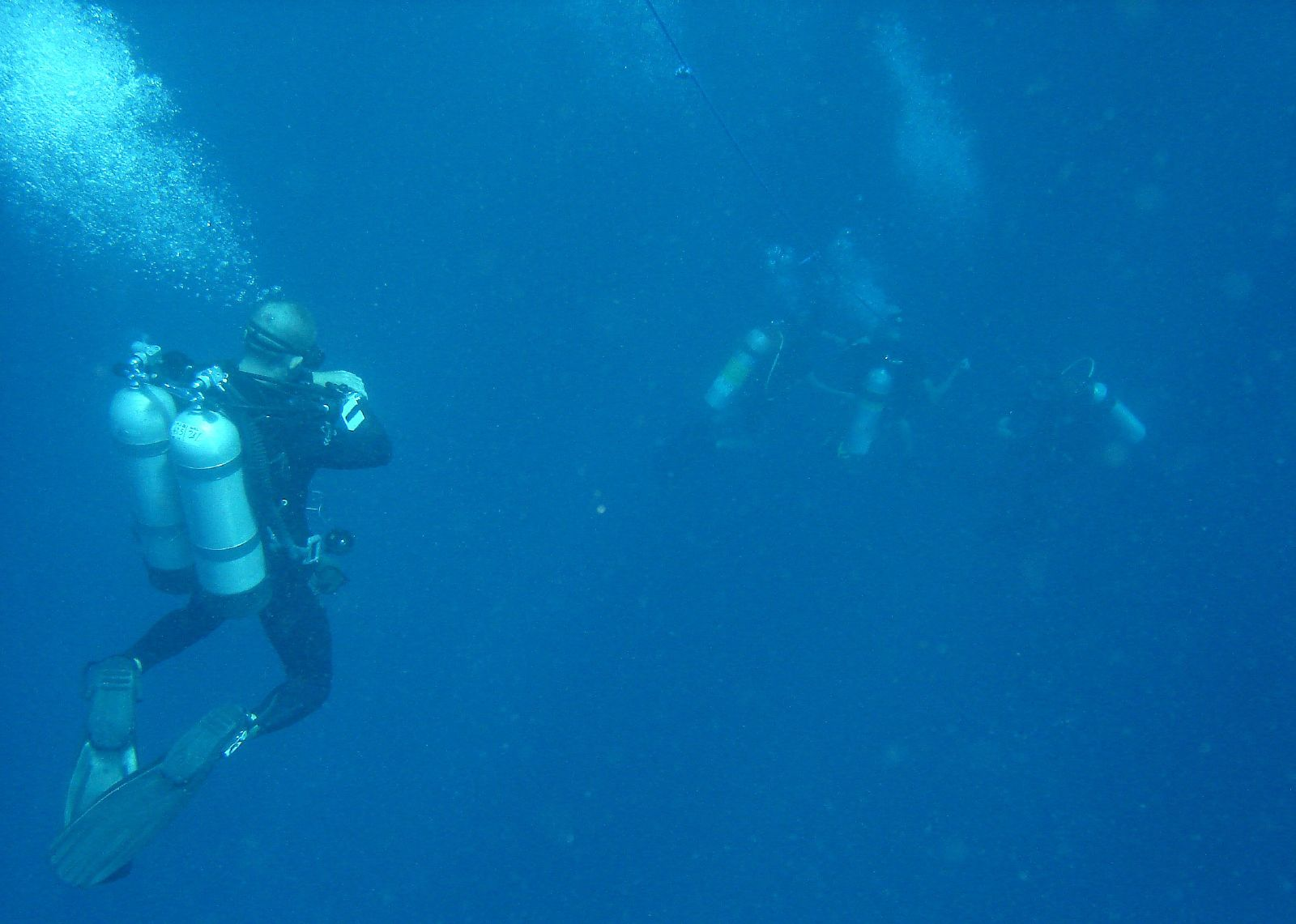
Divers decompressing in the water at the end of a dive

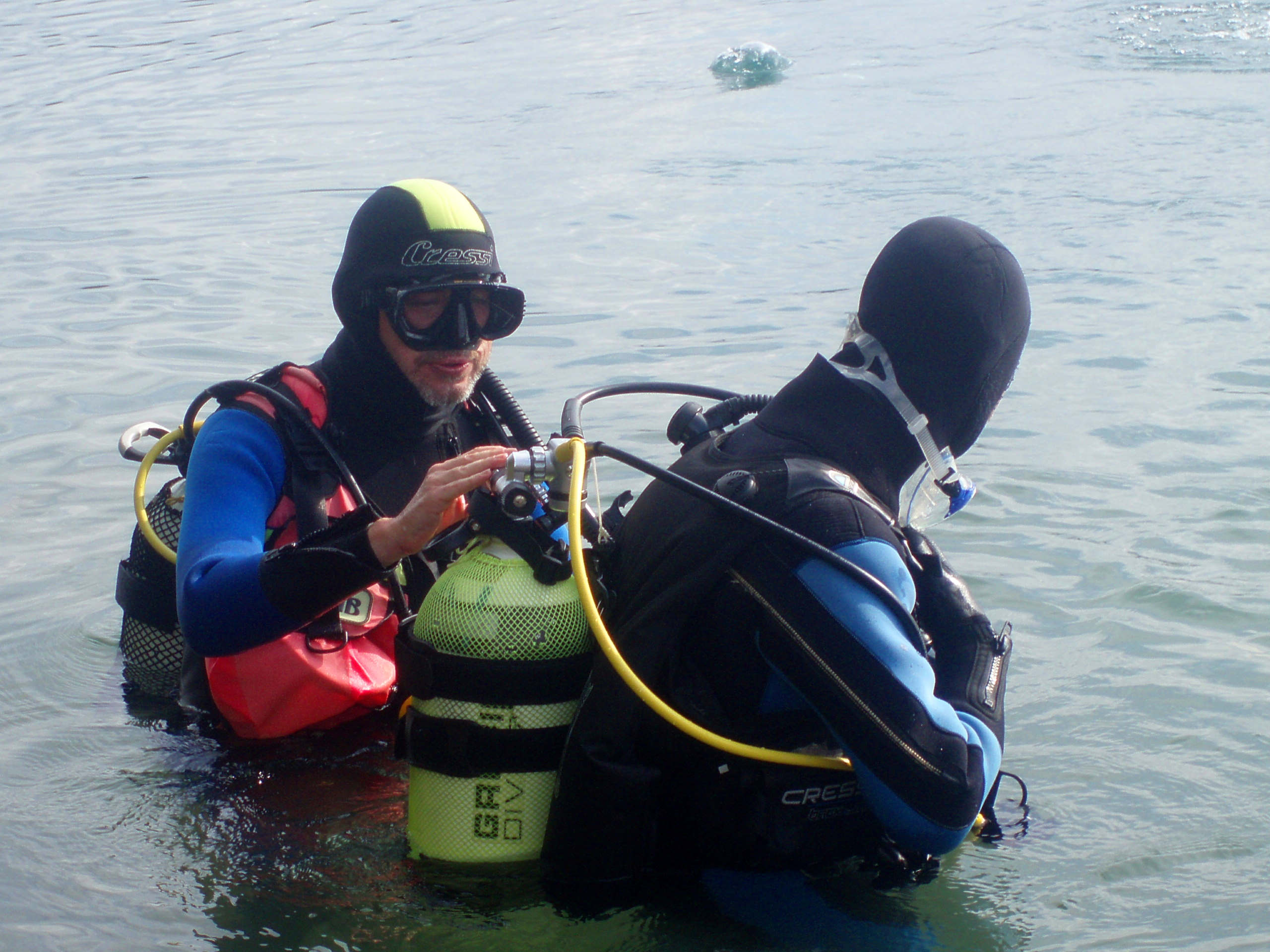
Divers doing a buddy check

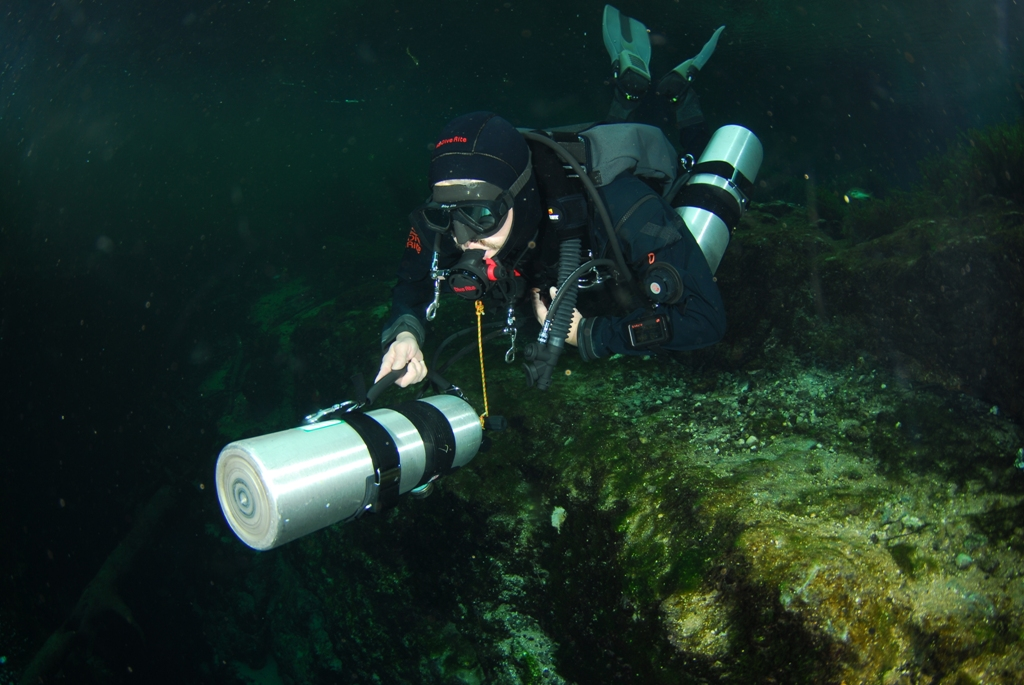
Sidemount diver pushing a cylinder in front

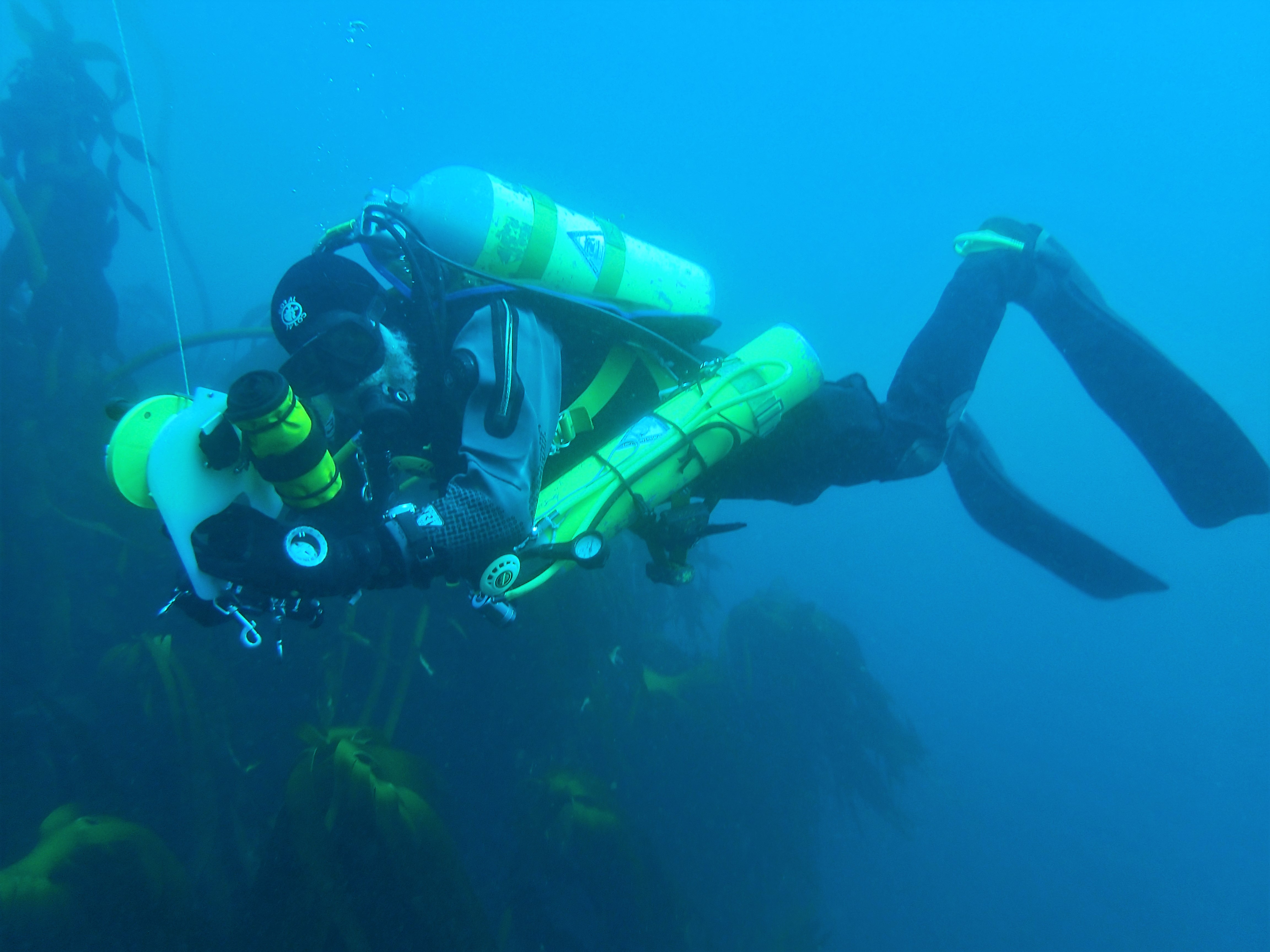
Solo diver surveying dive site. The bailout cylinder can be seen slung at the diver's left side.

Diving procedures – Standard underwater diving protocols

- Ascending and descending (diving) – Procedures for safe ascent and descent in underwater diving
  - Ear clearing – Equalising of pressure in the middle ears
  - Emergency ascent – Ascent to the surface by a diver in an emergency
    - Controlled emergency swimming ascent – Emergency procedure for scuba divers when out of air
    - Controlled buoyant lift – A technique used by scuba divers to raise an incapacitated diver to the surface
- Bell bounce diving – Surface oriented diving using a closed bell
- Boat diving – Procedures specific to diving from boats
  - Canoe and kayak diving – Recreational diving from a canoe or kayak
- Buoyancy control in scuba diving – Essential safety skill
- Decompression (diving) – Pressure reduction and its effects during ascent from depth
  - Decompression practice – Techniques and procedures for safe decompression of divers
    - Accelerated decompression – Decompresssion using oxygen-rich breathing gases
    - Altitude decompression – Reduction in ambient pressure due to ascent above sea level
    - Continuous decompression – Decompression without specific stops at given depths
    - Cross altitude corrections – Adjustments to the US Navy decompression tables to allow for altitude
    - Decompression stop – Pause during tascent from a dive to release dissolved inert gas in tissues
    - Deep stop – Additional stop deeper than the first obligatory decompression stop
    - Flying after diving, also known as ascent to altitude after diving – Precautions against decompression sickness when ascending to altitude after diving
    - Gas switching – Changing the breathing gas mixture during a dive
    - Pyle stop – Type of short deep decompression stops in addition to the standard profile
    - Ratio decompression – Rule of thumb for estimating a decompression schedule for a given set of breathing gases
    - Residual nitrogen time – Estimate of excess nitrogen remaining in tissues before repetitive dive
    - Safety stop – Optional decompression stop to reduce decompression stress
    - Saturation decompression – Decompression where all tissues are saturated with inert gas
    - Stage decompression – Decompression during ascent based on decompression stops
    - Surface decompression – Decompression in a diving chamber out of the water
- Dive log – Record of diving history of an underwater diver
- Dive planning – Process of planning an underwater diving operation
- Diver communications – Methods used by underwater divers to communicate
- Diver navigation – Underwater navigation by scuba divers
- Diver rescue – Rescue of a distressed or incapacitated diver
- Diver trim – Balance and orientation skills of an underwater diver
- Diving heavy – Underwater diving while intentionally negatively buoyant
- Drift diving – Scuba diving where the diver is intentionally transported by the water flow
- Finning techniques – Techniques used by divers and surface swimmers using swimfins
  - Back kick (finning) – Finning technique to move backwards
  - Combat sidestroke – Variation of side-stroke swimming used by United States Navy SEALs
  - Dolphin kick – Swimming style
  - Flutter kick – Kicking movement used in both swimming and calisthenics
  - Frog kick – Finning propulsion kick used particularly by cave and wreck divers
  - Helicopter turn – Rotation about a vertical axis by an underwater diver using only fins
  - Scissor kick (finning) – Techniques used by divers and surface swimmers using swimfins
- Repetitive dives – Diving again before the dissolved nitrogen has fully equilibrated
  - Surface interval – The time spent out of the water between dives
- Scuba skills – Skills required to scuba-dive safely
  - Buddy breathing – Technique for sharing breathing gas from a single mouthpiece
  - Buddy diving – Practice of mutual monitoring and assistance between two divers
    - Buddy check – Pre-dive safety checks carried out by two-diver dive teams
  - Low impact diving – Scuba diving that has minimal environmental effect
  - Penetration diving – Diving under a physical barrier to a direct vertical ascent to the surface
  - Rebreather diving – Underwater diving using self contained breathing gas recycling apparatus
  - Scuba gas management – Logistical aspects of scuba breathing gas
    - Gas blending for scuba diving – Mixing and filling cylinders with breathing gases for use when scuba diving
    - Rule of thirds (diving) – Rule of thumb for scuba gas management
    - Scuba gas planning – Estimation of breathing gas mixtures and quantities required for a planned dive profile
  - Sidemount diving – Diving using equipment configuration where scuba sets are clipped to the diver's sides
  - Solo diving – Recreational diving without a dive buddy
- Saturation diving – Diving mode and decompression technique
  - Saturation decompression – Decompression where all tissues are saturated with inert gas
  - Transfer under pressure – Moving between pressurised vessels without decompression
  - Lock-in (diving) – Enter an enclosed environment at a different pressure to ambient through an air-lock
  - Lock-off – Split a secure airtight connection between two pressurised chambers via an airlock
  - Lock-on (diving) – Make a secure airtight connection between two pressurised chambers via an airlock
  - Lock-out (diving) – Exit an enclosed environment at a different pressure to ambient through an air-lock
- Surface-supplied diving skills – Underwater diving procedures
  - Umbilical management – Safe handling of the diver's umbilical
- Underwater searches – Techniques for finding underwater targets

=== Diving support skills and procedures ===
- Diving gas analysis – Measuring the components in a breathing gas blend
  - Electro-galvanic oxygen sensor – Electrochemical device for measuring oxygen partial pressure
  - Helium analyser – Instrument to measure the concentration of helium in a gas mixture
- Gas blending – Producing special gas mixtures to specification
  - Gas blending for scuba diving – Mixing and filling cylinders with breathing gases for use when scuba diving
    - Partial pressure blending – Gas blending based on pressure ratio of components
    - Mass fraction blending – Mixing gas by measuring added mass of each component
    - Continuous blending and compression – Gas blending by constant flow mixing and analysis
    - Air top-up, also known as Air top – Modifying or completing a gas blend by adding compressed air
  - Oxygen compatibility – Usability in high-oxygen environments
- Chamber operation, also known as decompression chamber operation and diving chamber operation – Operation of a hyperbaric chamber in support of underwater diving
- Dive boat operation – Operational procedures for a boat supporting diving
- Dive supervision, also known as diver supervision and monitoring – The work of the manager of a professional diving team
- Diving bell deployment – Deployment of a modern diving bell
- Diving equipment maintenance and testing – Ensuring that the equipment is safe to use
- Diving project – The overall diving job by a diving contractor under a specific contract
- Diving project management
- Diving project mobilisation and demobilisation
- Diving stage deployment – Launch and recovery of a diving stage
- Hazmat diving decontamination – Removing hazardous environmental contaminants from the diver after a dive
- Job safety analysis – Procedure to integrate safety practices into a particular task
- Life support system operation – Operation of the systems which are necessary for the survival of the occupants
- Risk assessment – Estimation of risk associated with exposure to a given set of hazards
- ROV operation
- Surface stand-by diver procedures – Functions of member of a professional diving team
- Surface-supplied gas management – Provision of breathing gas to surface-supplied divers
- Umbilical tending – Management of the supply end of the diver's umbilical

=== Underwater diving, by environment ===
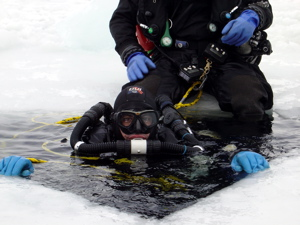
Ice Diving – View from the top

Underwater diving environment – Underwater environment to which a diver may be exposed

- List of diving environments by type – Variety of environments that people may dive in
- Open-water diving – Diving with access to breathable air of the atmosphere
- Altitude diving – Underwater diving at altitudes above 300 m
- Cave diving – Diving in water-filled caves
- Deep diving – Underwater diving to a depth beyond the norm
- Ice diving – Underwater diving under ice
- Muck diving – Recreational diving on a loose sedimentary bottom
- Night diving – Underwater diving during the hours of darkness
- Recreational dive sites – Places that divers go to enjoy the underwater environment
- Underwater environment – Aquatic or submarine environment
- Wreck diving – Recreational diving on wrecks

=== Occupational diving ===
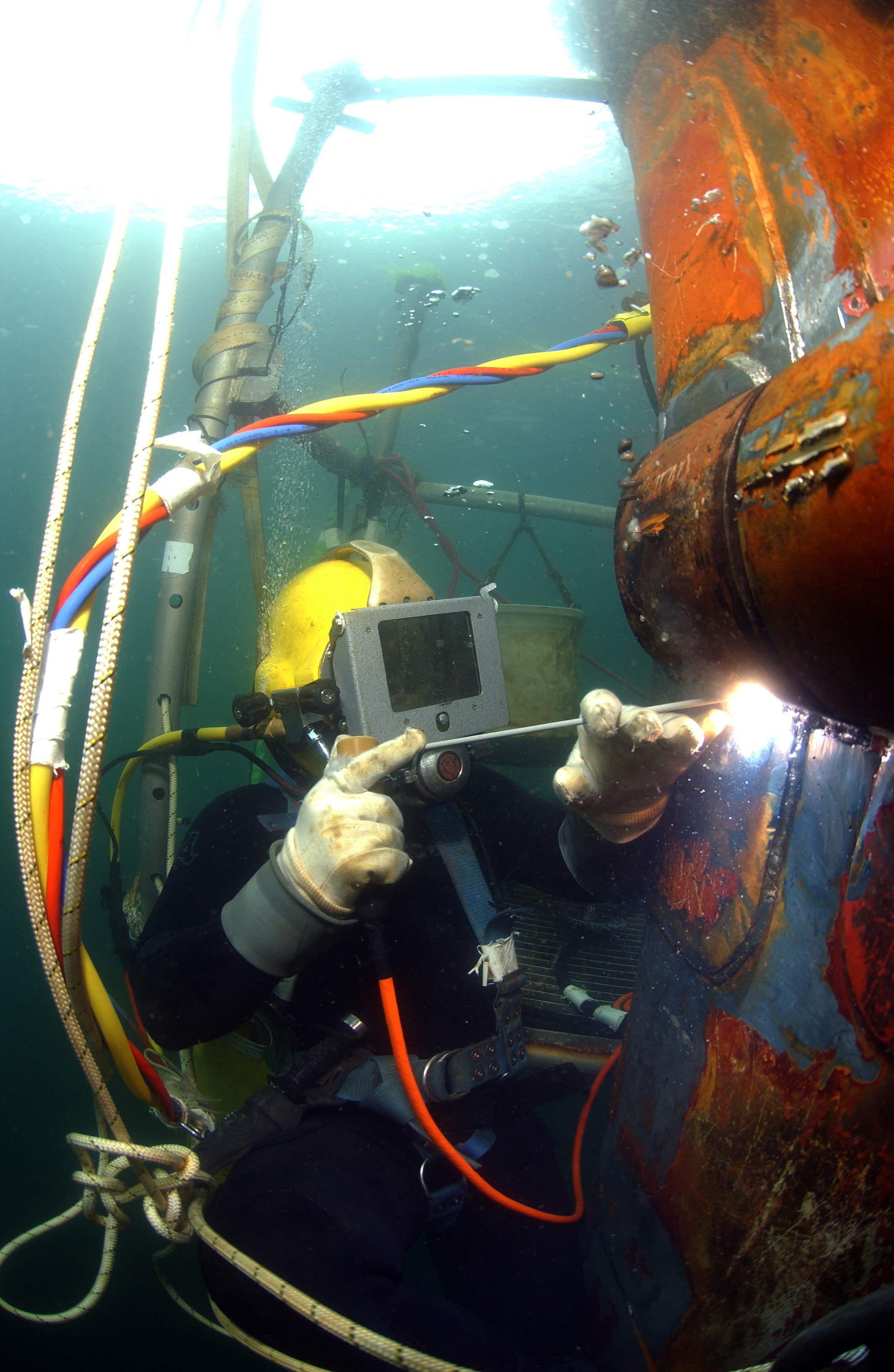
Underwater welding.

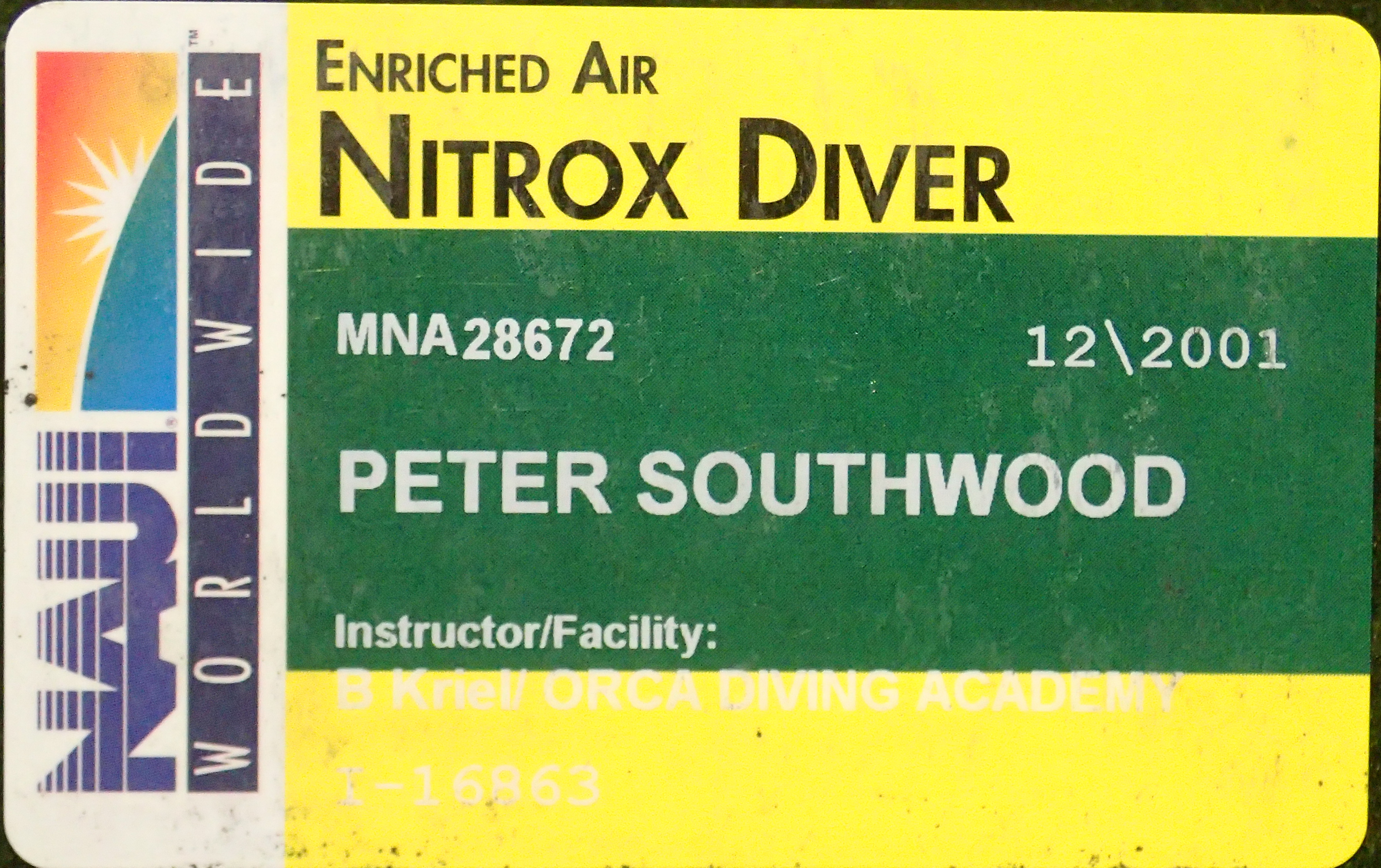
NAUI Nitrox diver certification card

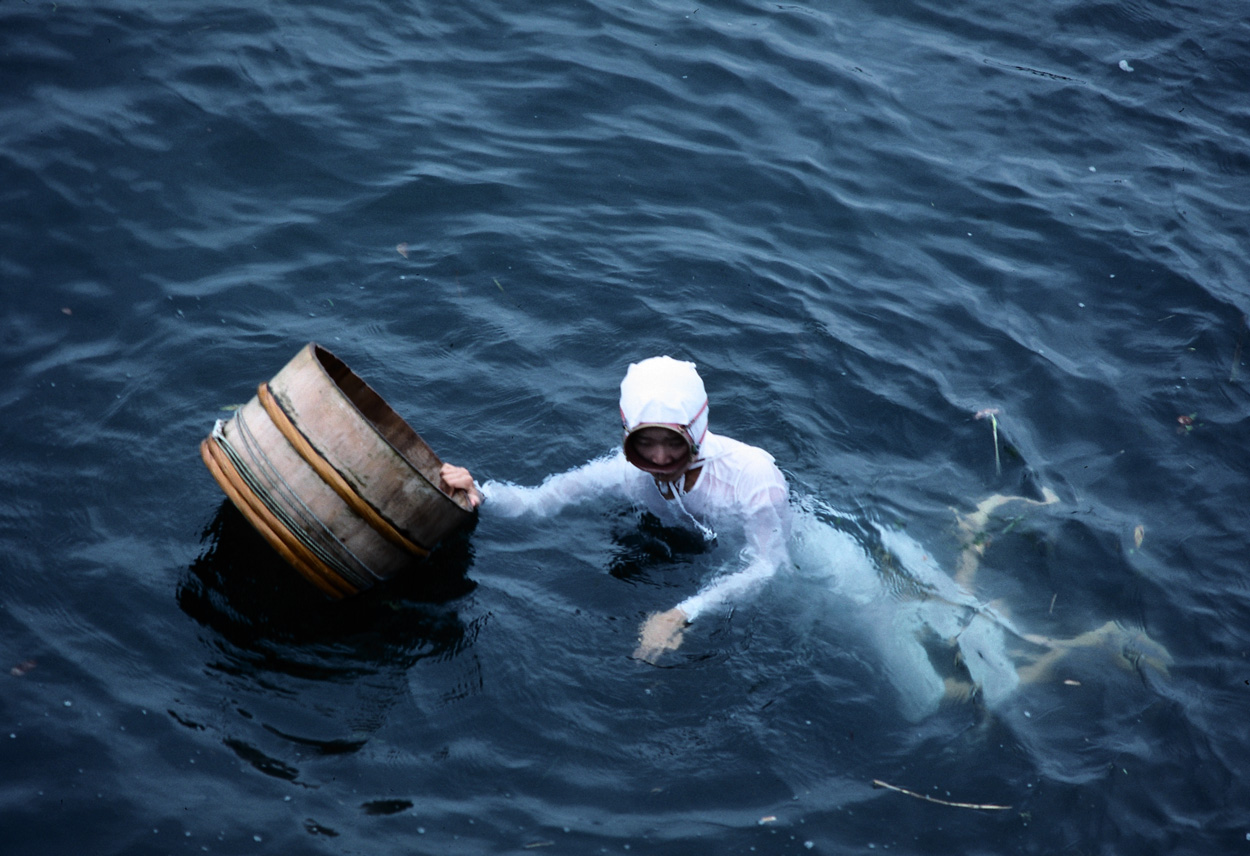
Pearl diver in Japan

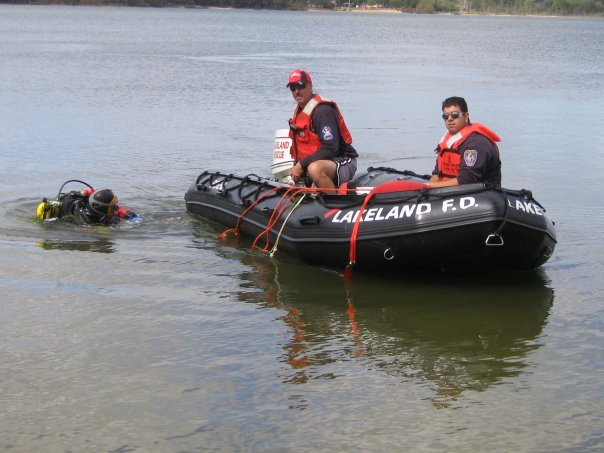
Nesconset fire department scuba rescue team on training exercise

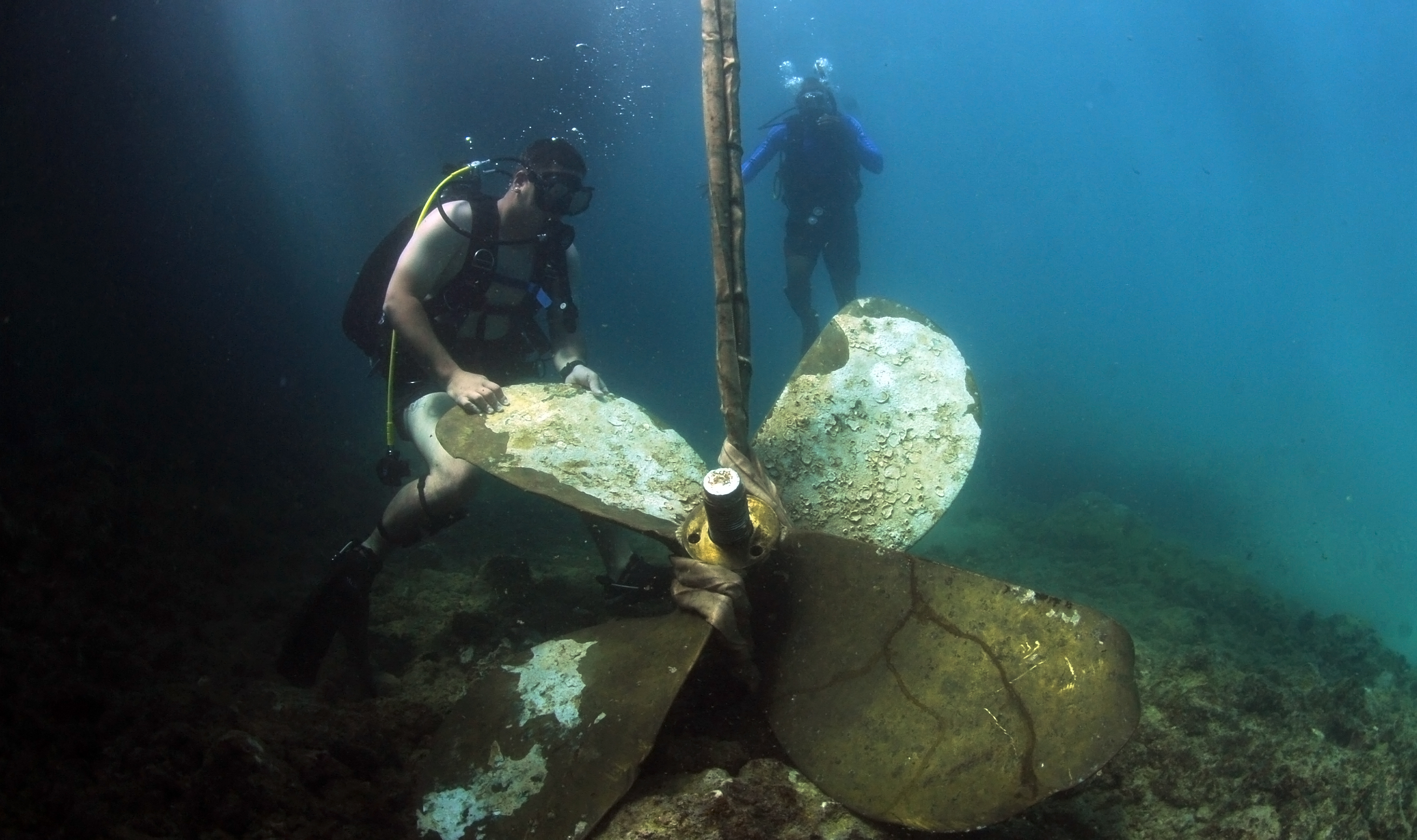
Salvaging a ship's propeller

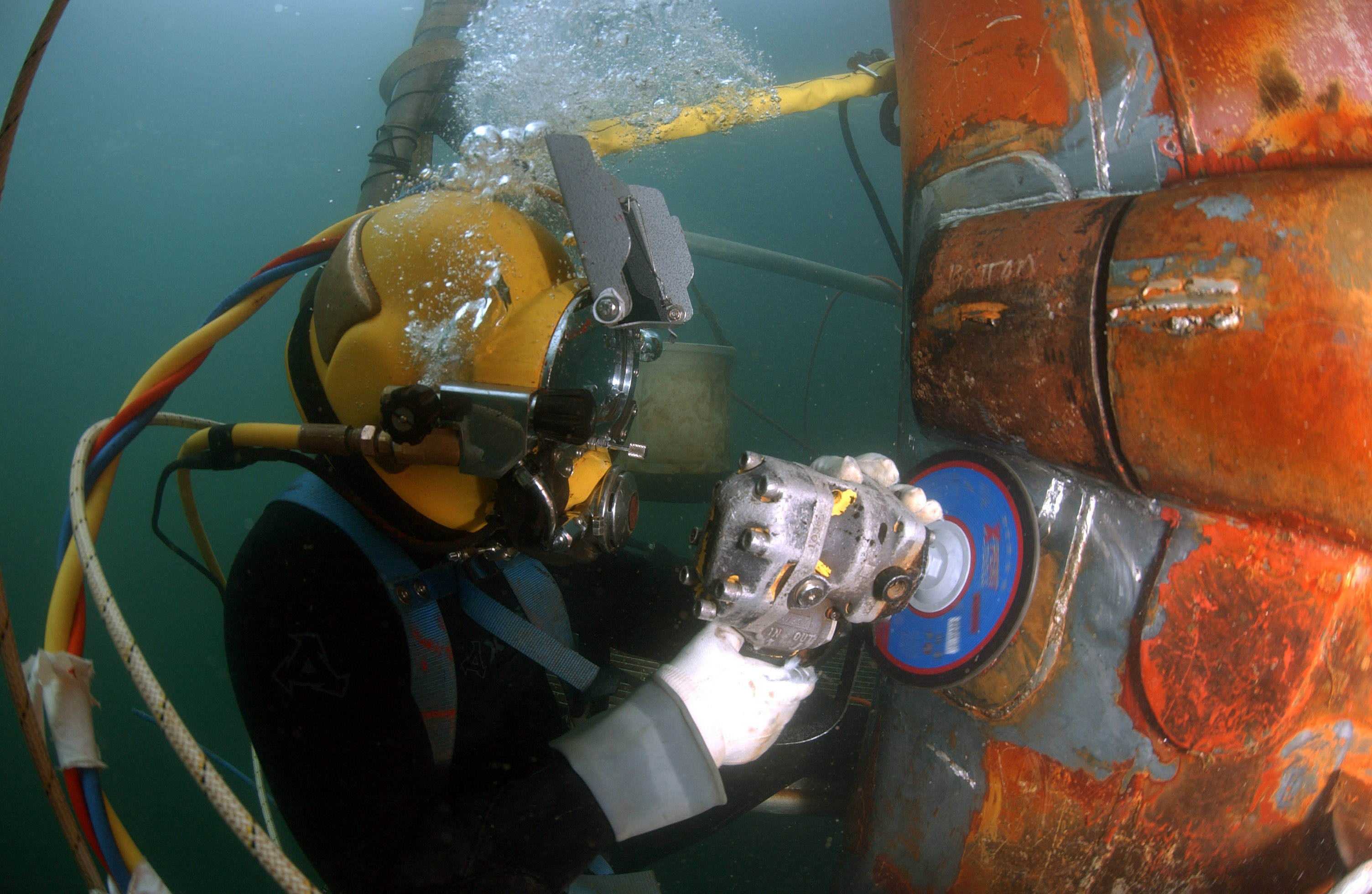
A diver at work on hull maintenance

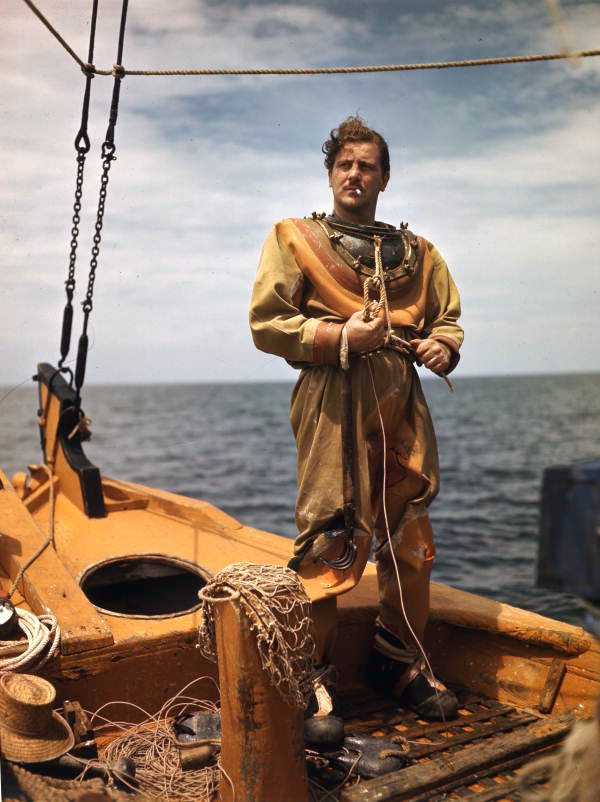
Sponge diver putting on his diving suit in Tarpon Springs, Florida.

Professional diving, also known as occupational diving – Underwater diving where divers are paid for their work

- Ama – Japanese pearl divers
- Aquarium diving – Occupational diving in large aquariums
- Commercial diving – Professional diving on industrial projects
  - Commercial offshore diving – Professional diving in support of the oil and gas industry
  - Hyperbaric welding – Welding metal at elevated pressure
  - Nondestructive testing – Type of analysis technique
- Dive leader – Recreational diving certification and role
- Diver training – Processes to develop the skills and knowledge to dive safely underwater
  - Diving instructor – Person who trains and assesses underwater divers
  - Diving school – Establishment for training and assessing underwater divers
  - Occupational diver training – Training of people employed as underwater divers
    - Commercial diver training – Processes by which people learn to dive safely for industrial applications
    - Military diver training – Training of underwater divers for service in the armed forces
    - Public safety diver training – Training divers for public safety services
    - Scientific diver training – Training divers who will be doing scientific work underwater
  - Recreational diver training – Training process for people who do not dive at work
    - Technical diver training – Processes to develop skills and knowledge to dive safely for technical diving
  - Diver certification – Certification as competent to dive to a specified standard
    - List of diver certification organizations – Agencies which issue certification for competence in diving skills
  - Diamond Reef System – System for training divers in buoyancy
- Divemaster, also known as dive guide, or dive leader – Recreational dive leader certification and role
- Diving contractor – The legal persona responsible for professional diving operations for a client
- Haenyeo – Female divers of Jeju, South Korea
- Hazmat diving – Underwater diving in a known hazardous materials environment
- Media diving – Underwater diving in support of the media industries
- Military diving – Underwater diving in a military context by members of an armed force
  - Defense against swimmer incursions – Methods of protection from incursions by divers and swimmers
  - Army engineer diver – Armed forces occupation
  - Clearance diver – Navy diver specialised in explosives
  - List of military diving units
    - Army Ranger Wing – Special operations force of the Irish Defence Forces
    - British commando frogmen – Special Boat Service, whose members are drawn largely from the Royal Marines
    - Canadian Armed Forces Divers – Underwater divers employed by any of the Canadian armed forces
    - Clearance Diving Branch (RAN) – Diving unit of the Royal Australian Navy
    - Comando Raggruppamento Subacquei e Incursori Teseo Tesei – Italian special forces diving unit
    - Commandos Marine – Special operations forces of the French Navy
    - Commandos Marine § Commando Hubert – Special operations forces of the French Navy – Unit with combat swimmers.
    - Decima Flottiglia MAS – Italian naval commando frogman unit of the Fascist era
    - Frogman – Tactical scuba diver
    - GRUMEC, also known as Brazilian commando frogmen – Brazilian Navy special forces diving unit
    - Kommando Spezialkräfte Marine – German commando and amphibious warfare force
    - KOPASKA – Indonesian Navy special operations and demolition unit
    - Marine Commandos – Marine special operations group of the Lebanese Army
    - Minedykkerkommandoen – Norwegian Navy clearance diver unit
    - Minentaucher – Mine clearance divers of the German Navy
    - PASKAL – Special operations force of the Royal Malaysian Navy
    - Naval Service Diving Section – Diving unit of the Irish Naval Service
    - Naval Special Warfare Command (Thailand) – Special operations force within the Military of Thailand
    - Röjdykare – Clearance divers of the Swedish Navy
    - Russian commando frogmen – Tactical scuba diving unit
    - Shayetet 13 – Special operations unit of the Israeli Navy
    - Special Boat Service – Special forces unit of the Royal Navy
    - Special Service Group – Special operations force of the Pakistan Navy
    - Taifib – Indonesian Marine Corps amphibious reconnaissance unit
    - Underwater Defence – Special operations unit of the Turkish Navy
    - Underwater Demolition Command – Special warfare unit of the Greek Navy
    - Underwater Offence – Special operations Forces of the Turkish Navy
    - United States military divers – Underwater divers employed by the US armed forces
      - Master diver – Senior diver rating in US Navy
      - Navy diver – US Navy personnel qualified in underwater diving and salvage
      - Explosive ordnance disposal – US Navy personnel who render safe or detonate unexploded ordnance
      - Underwater Demolition Team – US Navy special operations group
      - United States Marine Corps Combatant Diver Course – Military diver training for the US Marines
      - United States Navy SEALs – U.S. Navy's special operations force
        - List of United States Navy SEALs – Notable members of the US Navy SEALs and UDTs
        - United States Navy SEAL selection and training – Special forces unit policy and procedures
        - National Navy UDT-SEAL Museum – Museum of US Navy special forces units
  - Underwater warfare – One of the four operational areas of naval warfare
- Nuclear diving – Diving in an environment where there is a risk of exposure to radioactive materials
- Pearl hunting – Collecting pearls from wild molluscs
- Public safety diving – Underwater work done by law enforcement, rescue and search and recovery teams
  - Police diving – Branch of professional diving carried out by police services
    - Special Duties Unit – Hong Kong Police tactical unit
- Salvage diving – Diving work associated with the recovery of vehicles, cargo and structures
- Scientific diving – Use of diving techniques in the pursuit of scientific knowledge
- Ships husbandry diving – Diving related to the maintenance and upkeep of ships
- Sponge diving – Diving to gather natural sponges
- Underwater archaeology – Study of human activity via evidence found underwater
- Underwater demolition – Deliberate destruction of underwater obstacles
- Underwater photography – Genre of photography
- Underwater search and recovery – Locating and recovering underwater objects
- Underwater videography – Electronic underwater photography concerned with capturing moving images

=== Recreational diving ===
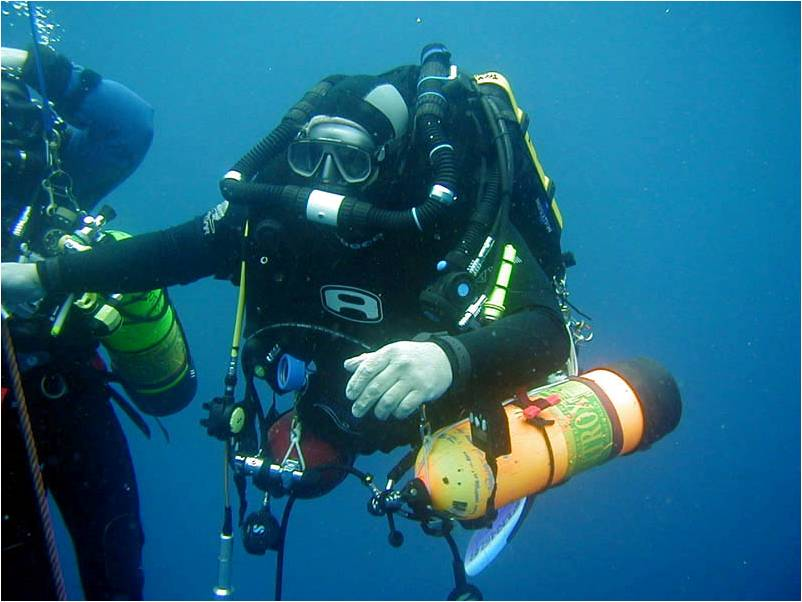
Diver returning from a 600 ft (183 m) technical dive

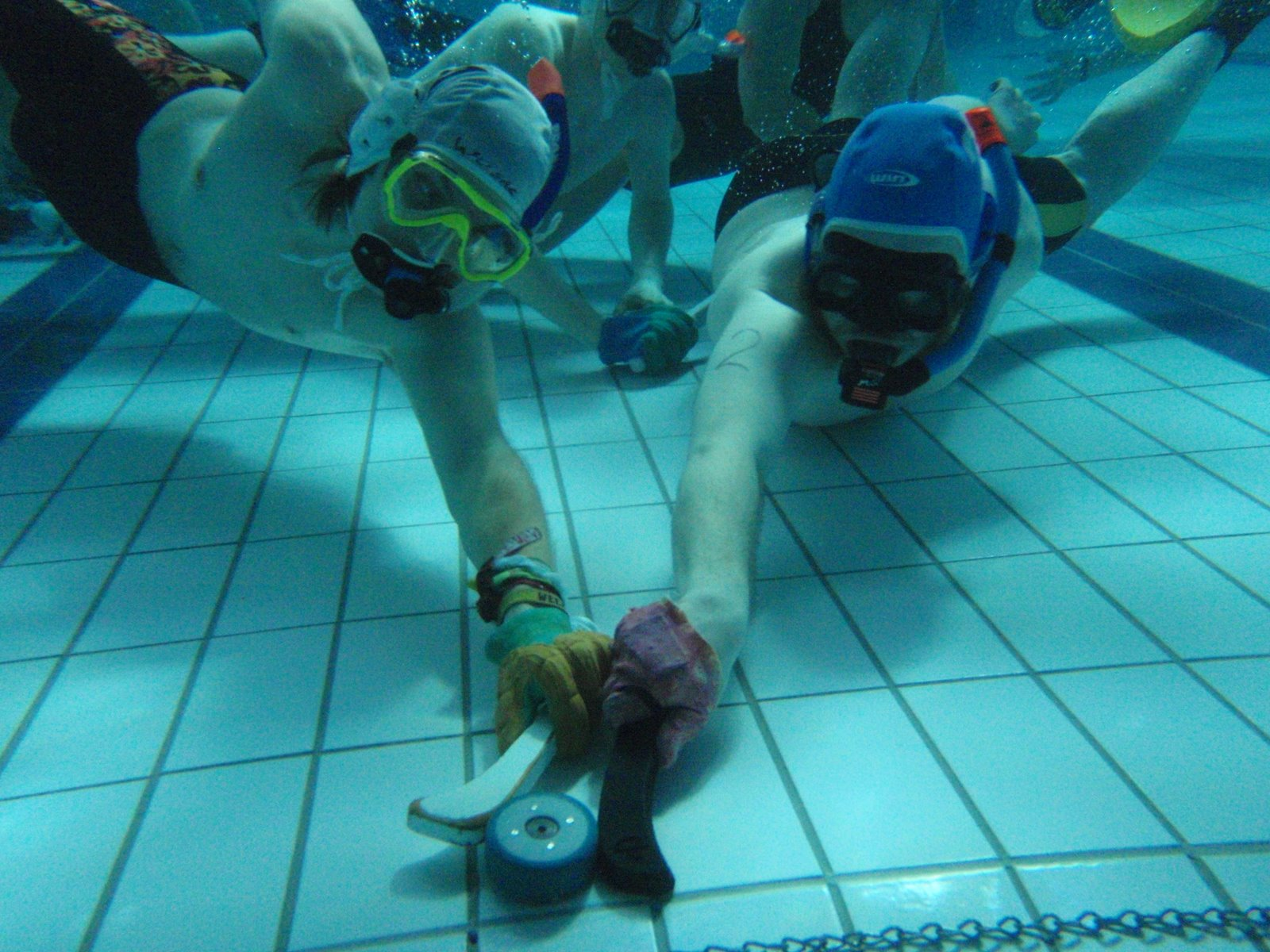
Two underwater hockey players competing for the puck

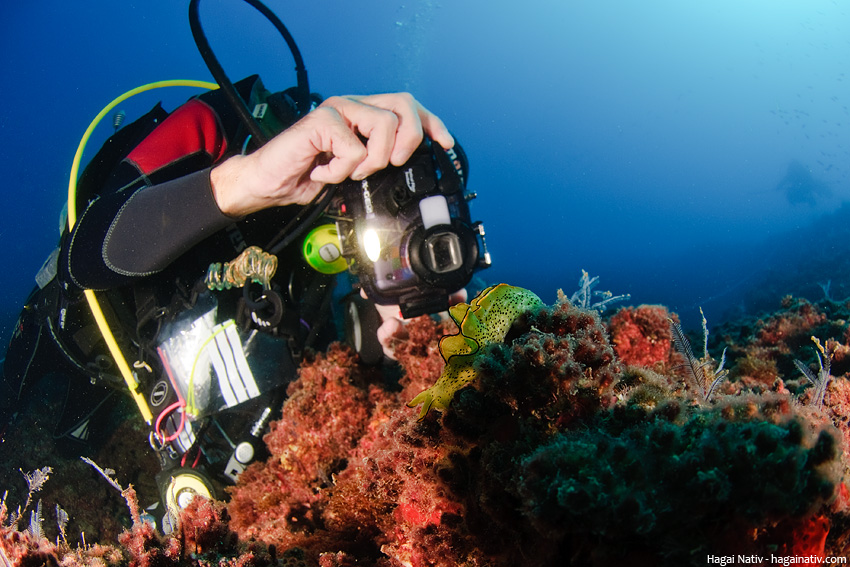
Underwater photographer

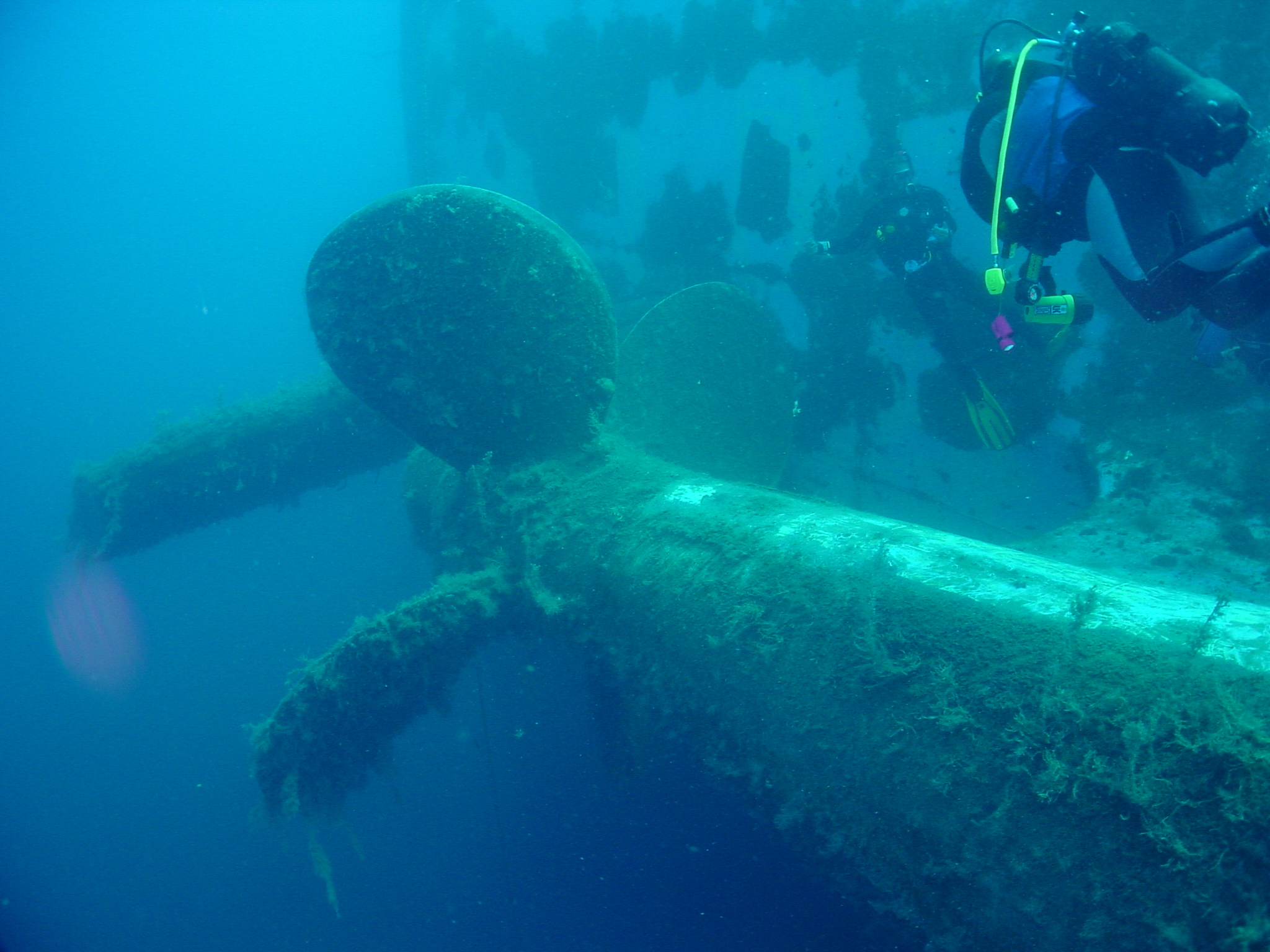
Divers on the wreck of the Zenobia

Recreational diving – Diving for the purpose of leisure and enjoyment

- Technical diving – Diving beyond the scope of recreational diving
  - Cave diving – Diving in water-filled caves
  - Doing It Right – Technical diving safety philosophy
- Shark tourism – Tourism industry for viewing wild sharks
  - Shark cage diving – Diving inside a protective cage to observe sharks in the wild
    - Shark-proof cage – A metal structure to protect divers and snorkellers from potentially dangerous sharks
    - Shark baiting – Attracting sharks by chumming the water
- Underwater photography – Genre of photography
- Underwater sports – Competitive underwater recreational activities
  - Aquathlon – Competitive underwater wrestling
  - Competitive apnea – Competitive breathhold diving
    - Constant weight apnea – Freediving discipline
    - Constant weight without fins – Freediving discipline
    - Dynamic apnea – Freediving disciplines where the diver swims horizontally under water
    - Free immersion apnea – Human-powered freediving discipline
    - No-limits apnea – Freediving discipline
    - Variable weight apnea – Deep freediving using a weighted sled for descent, pulling along the depth rope for ascent
    - Static apnea – Stationary diving discipline of holding breath underwater
    - Skandalopetra diving – Freediving using a stone weight at the end of a rope to the surface
  - Finswimming – Competitive watersport using swimfins for propulsion
    - 2016 Finswimming World Championships – International competition in Volos, Greece
    - 2018 Finswimming World Championships – International competition in Belgrade, Serbia
    - Apnea finswimming – Underwater swimming in a swimming pool using mask, monofin and holding one's breath.
    - Finswimming at the 2009 Asian Indoor Games – Competition held in Mỹ Đình National Aquatics Sports Complex, Hanoi, Vietnam
    - Immersion finswimming – Competitive scuba watersport using swimfins for propulsion
  - Spearfishing – Hunting for fish using a spear
  - Sport diving – Underwater sport using recreational open circuit scuba equipment in a swimming pool
  - Underwater football – Underwater team sport using snorkeling equipment and an American football
  - Underwater hockey – Underwater sport of pushing a puck into the opposing goal
  - Underwater ice hockey – Freediving variant of ice hockey played upside-down under the ice
  - Underwater orienteering – Underwater compass navigation and speed competition on scuba.
  - Underwater photography – Competitive underwater digital photography on scuba
  - Underwater rugby – Underwater team sport
  - Underwater target shooting – Underwater sport
- Wreck diving – Recreational diving on wrecks

== Diving and support equipment, tools and weapons ==
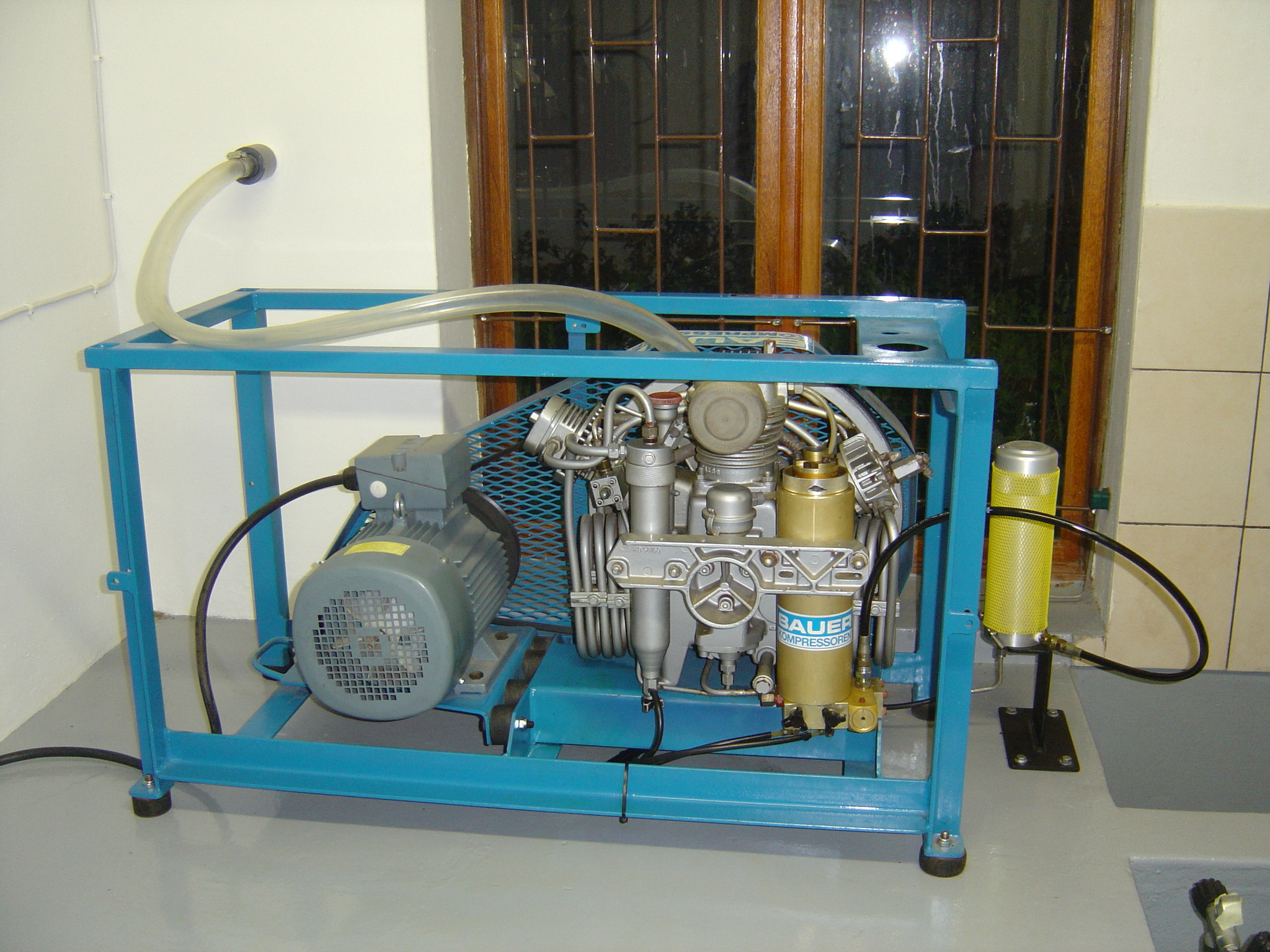
Small high-pressure breathing air compressor

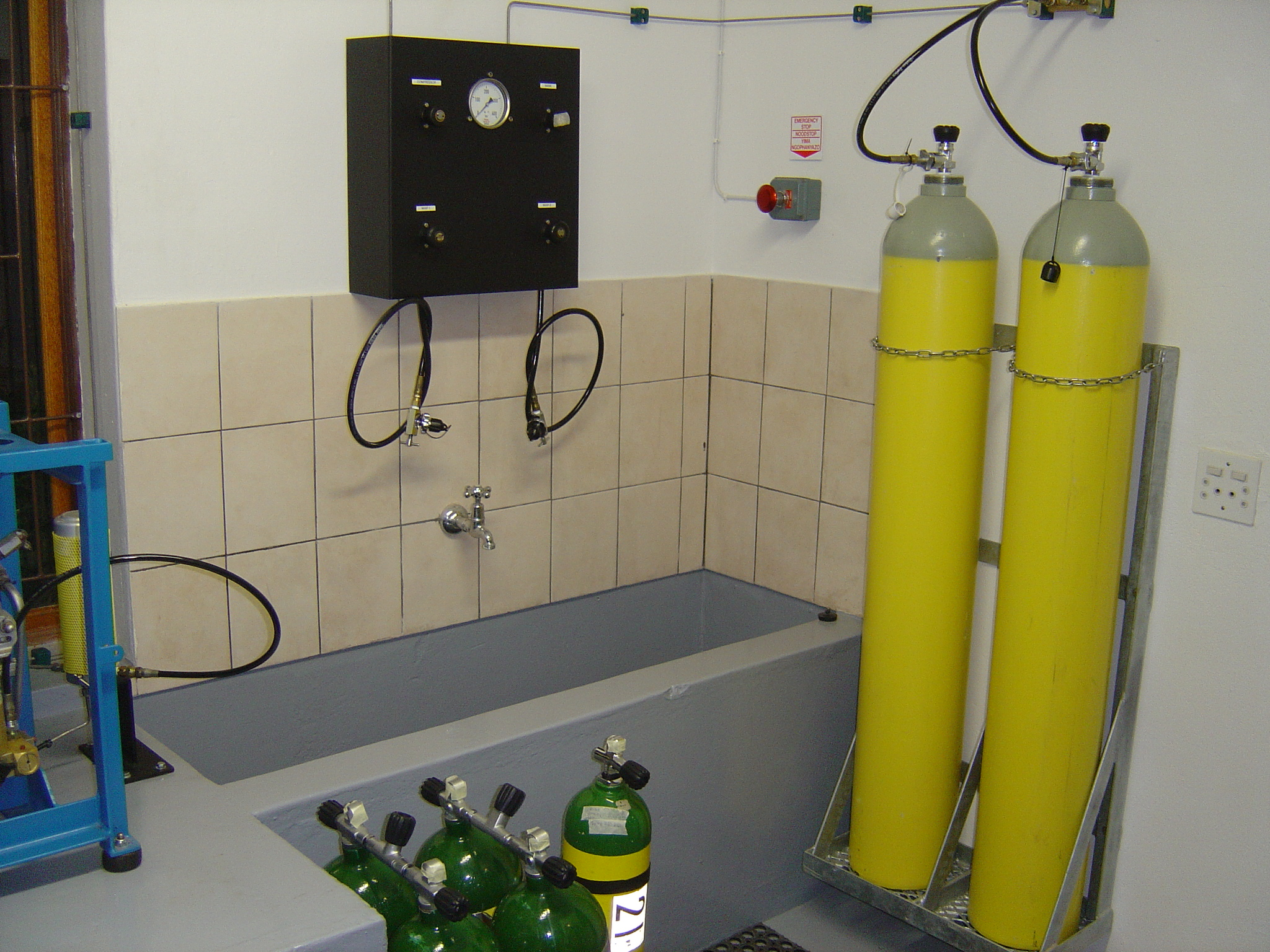
A small scuba filling and blending station supplied by a compressor and storage bank

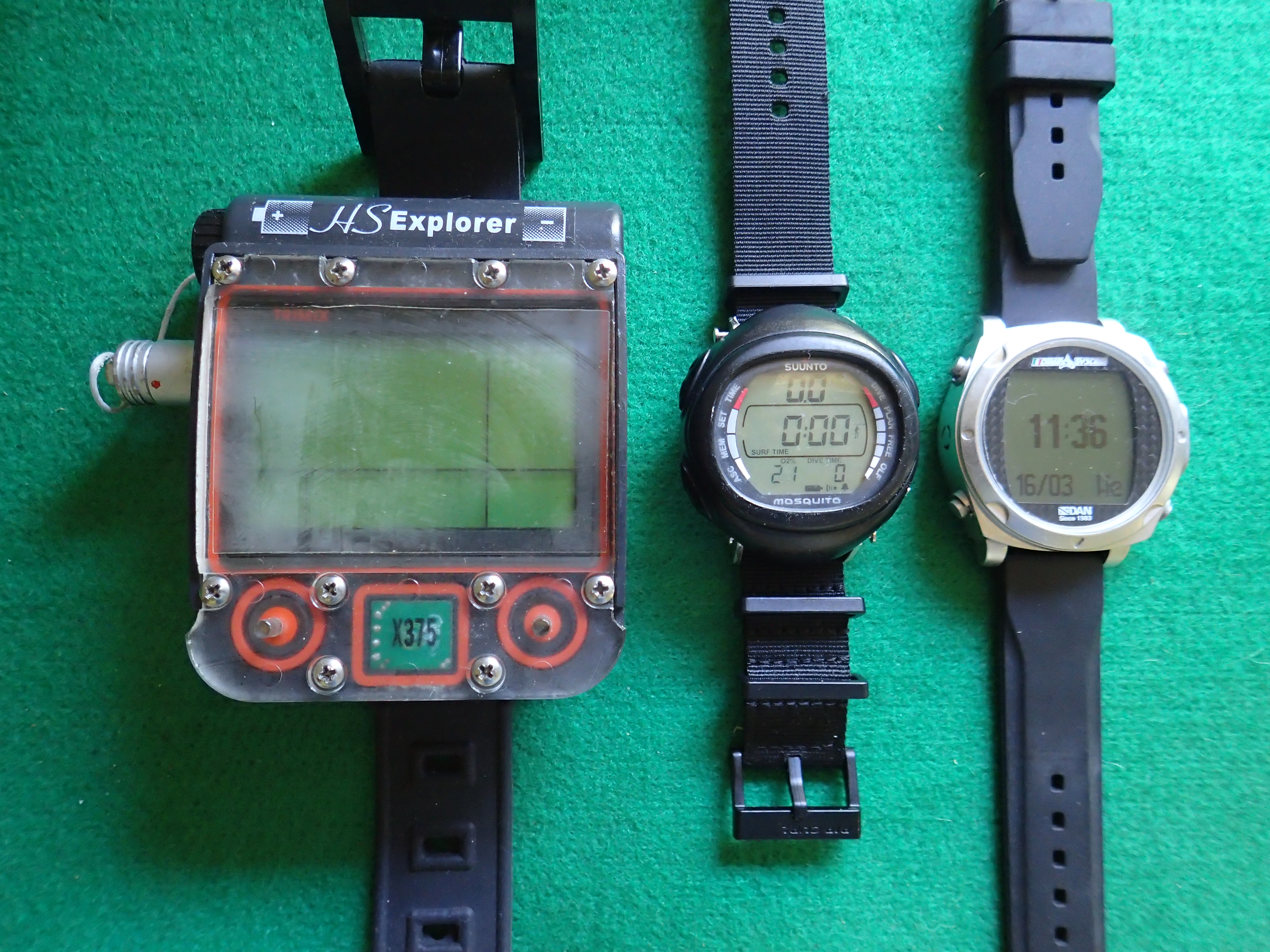
Three representative wrist-mount dive computers

International code flag Alpha indicates that a diver is underwater nearby

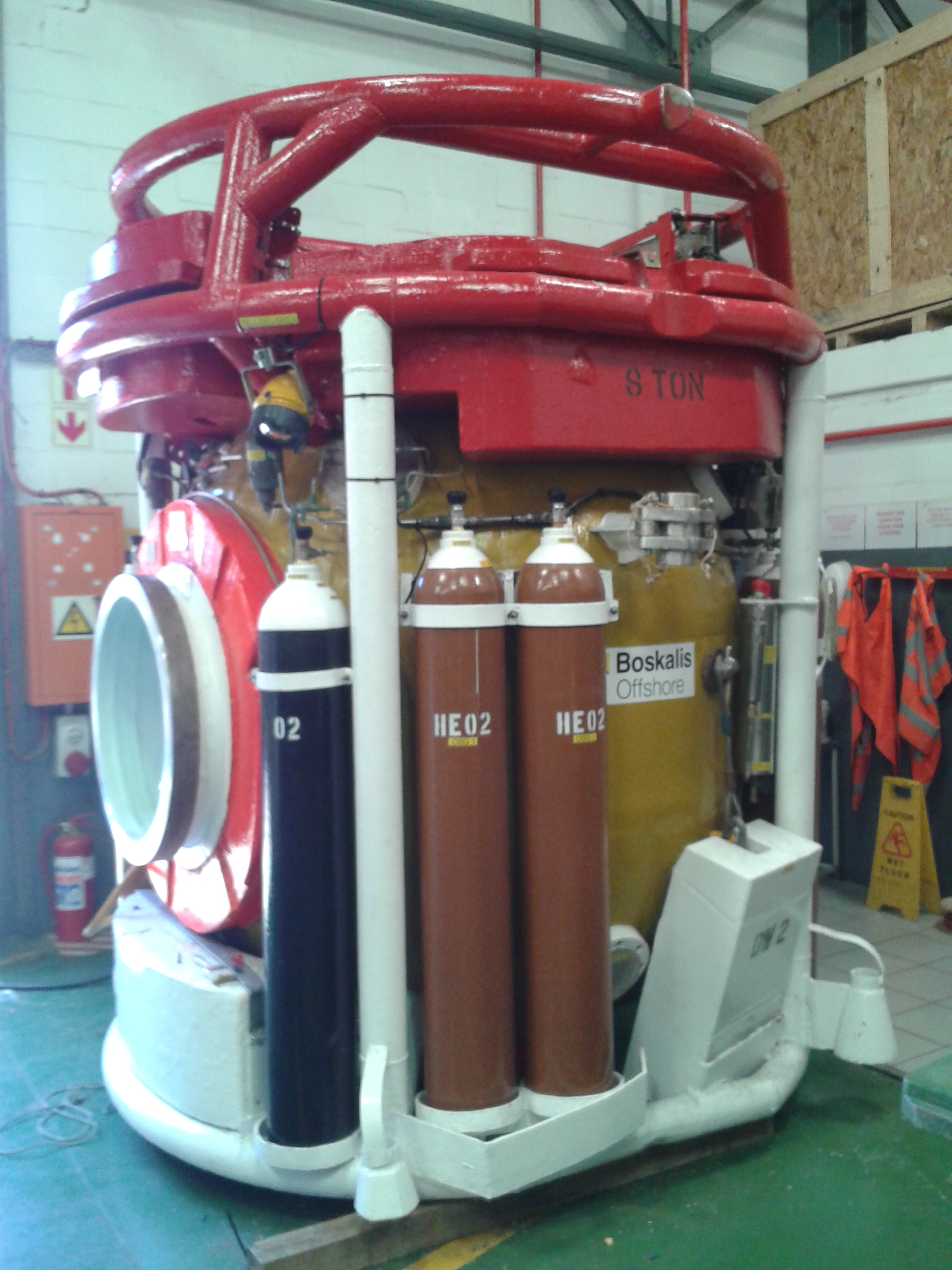
A closed bell used for saturation diving

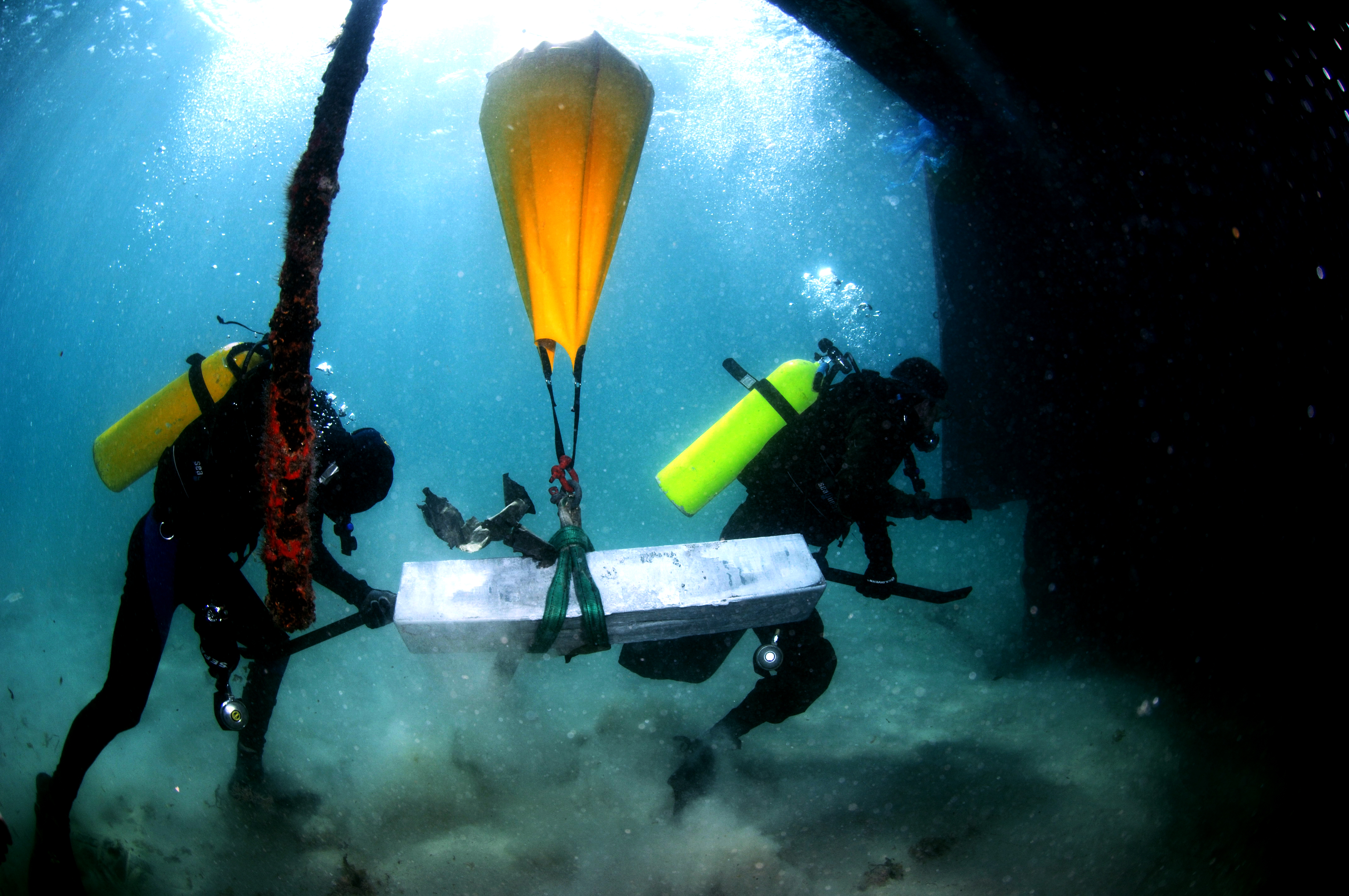
Lifting bag used to move a heavy object underwater

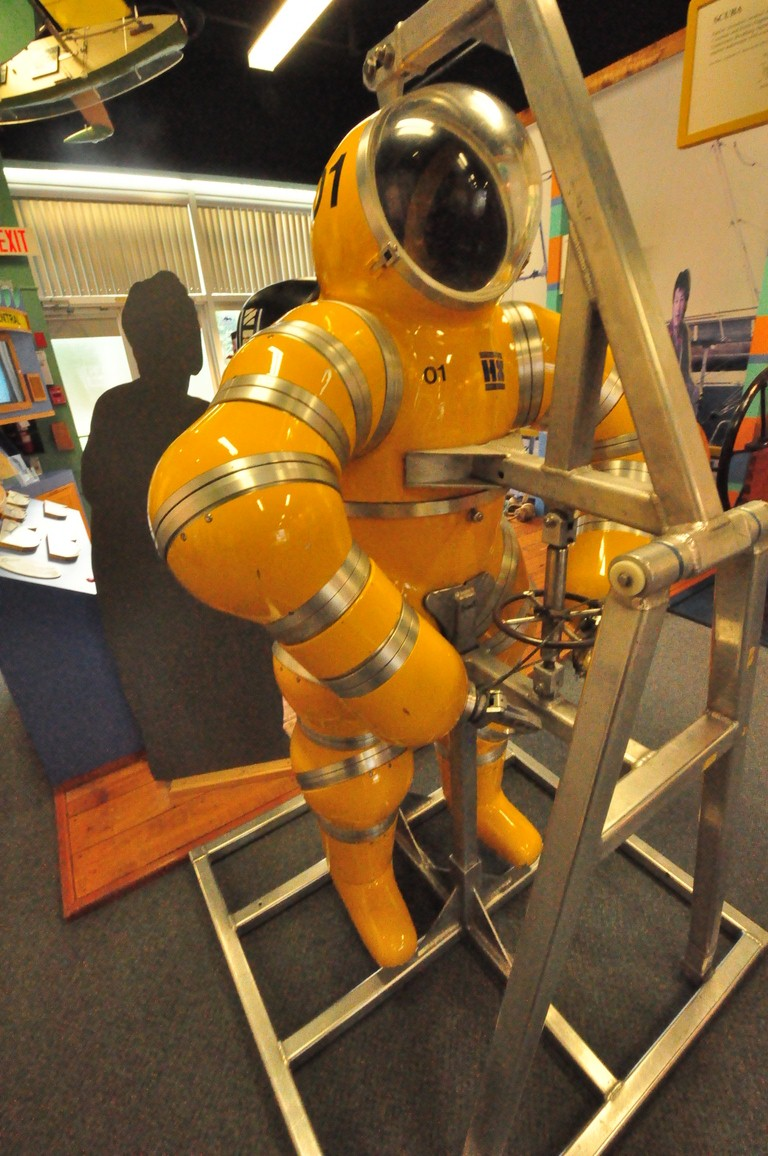
The Newtsuit atmospheric diving suit

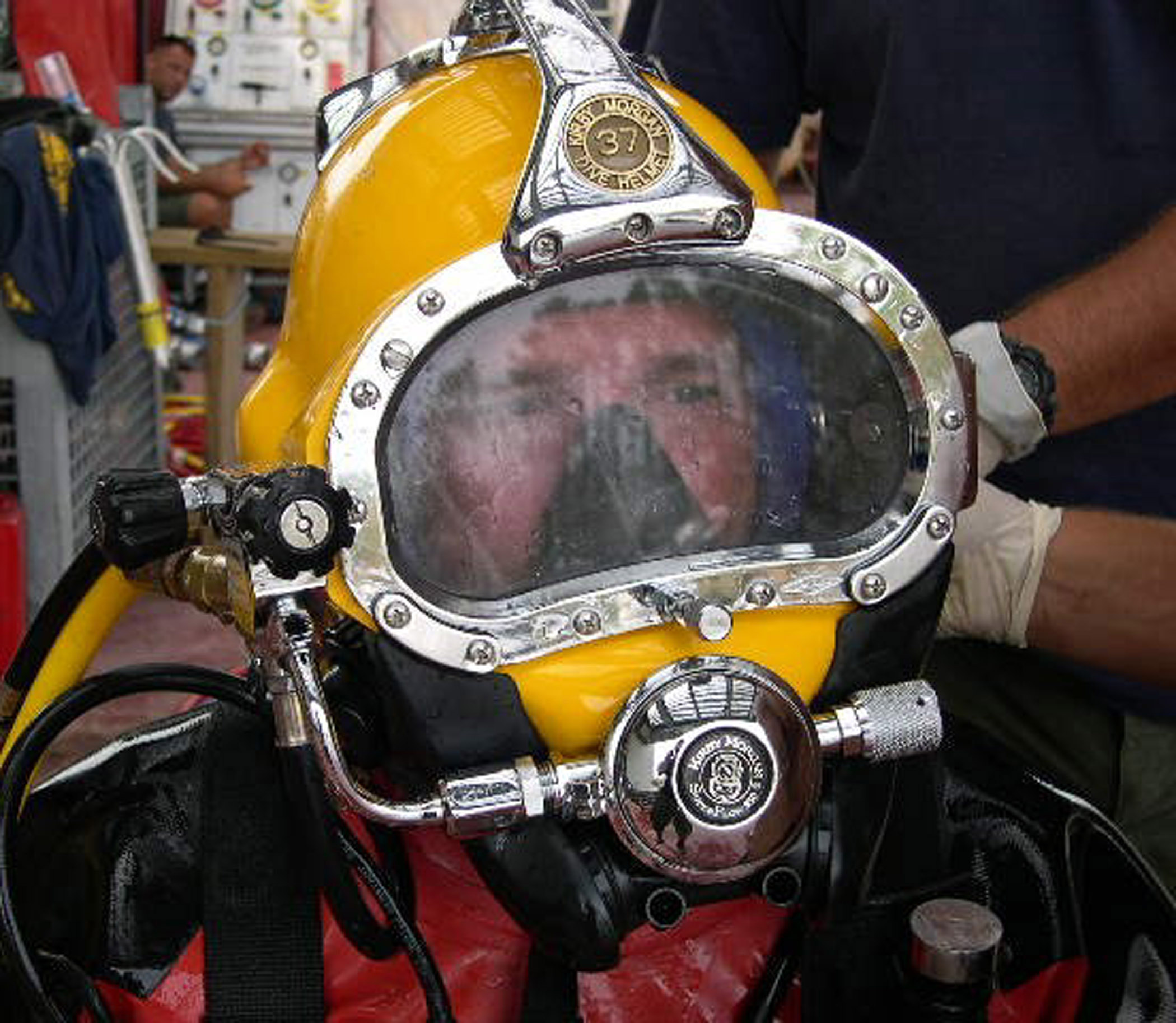
US Navy Diver using Kirby Morgan 37 diving helmet

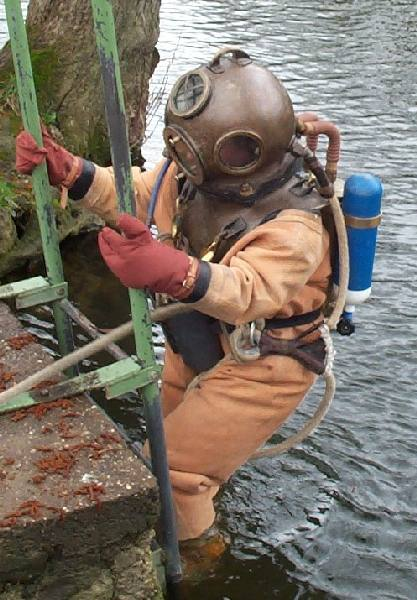
Helmeted diver entering the water. He has a back mounted Draeger DM40 rebreather system in addition to the surface supply air hose

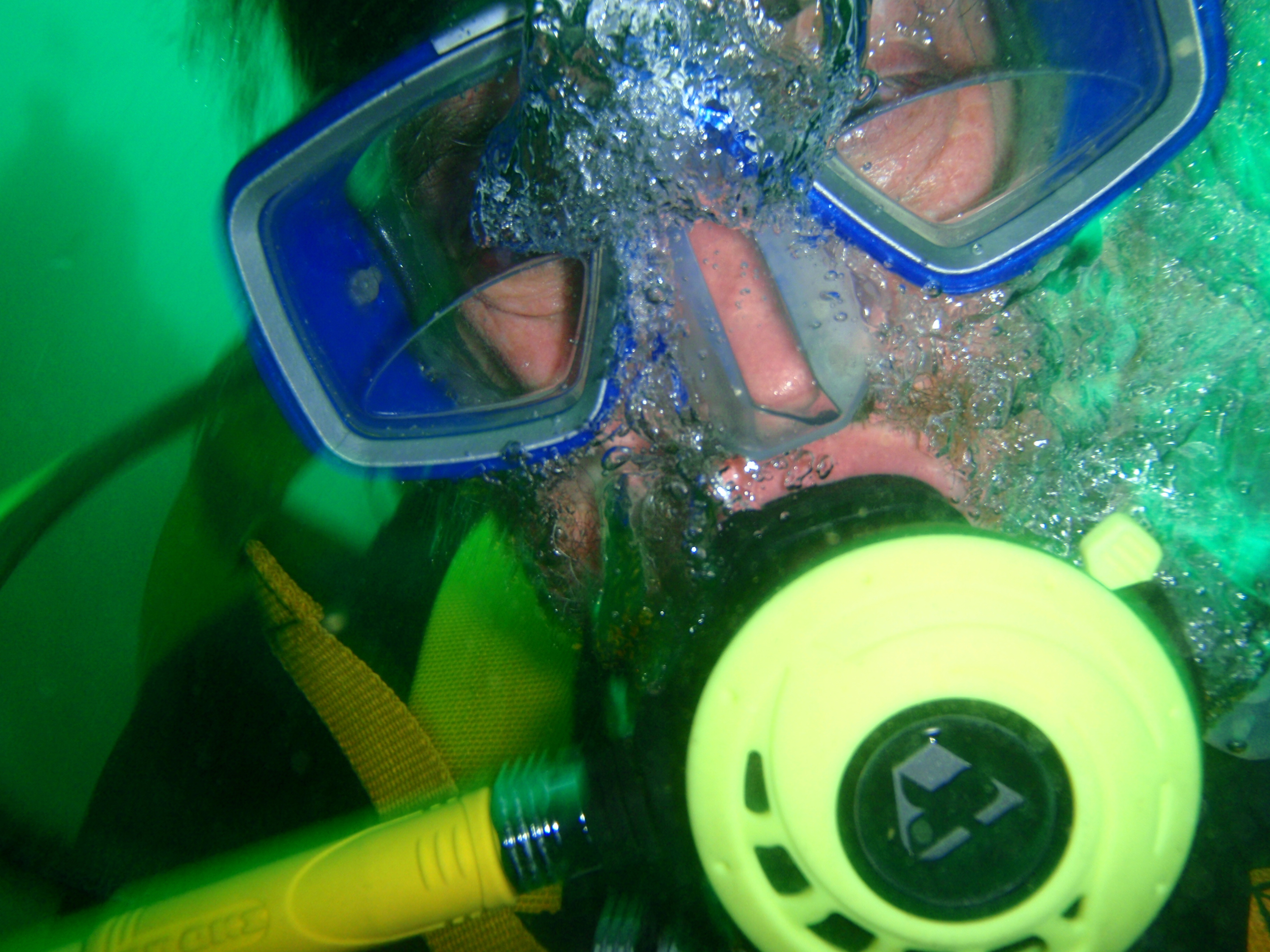
Scuba diver with bifocal lenses in half mask

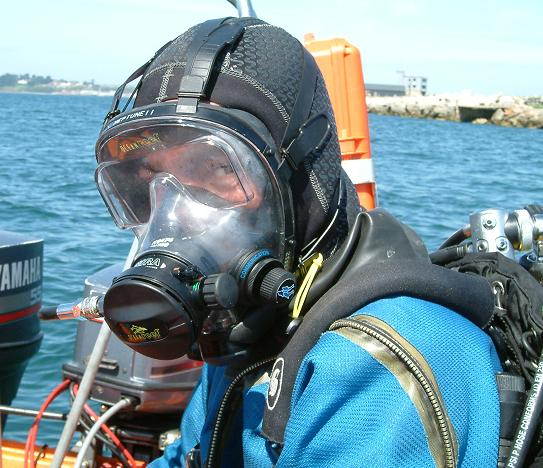
A diver wearing an Ocean Reef full face mask

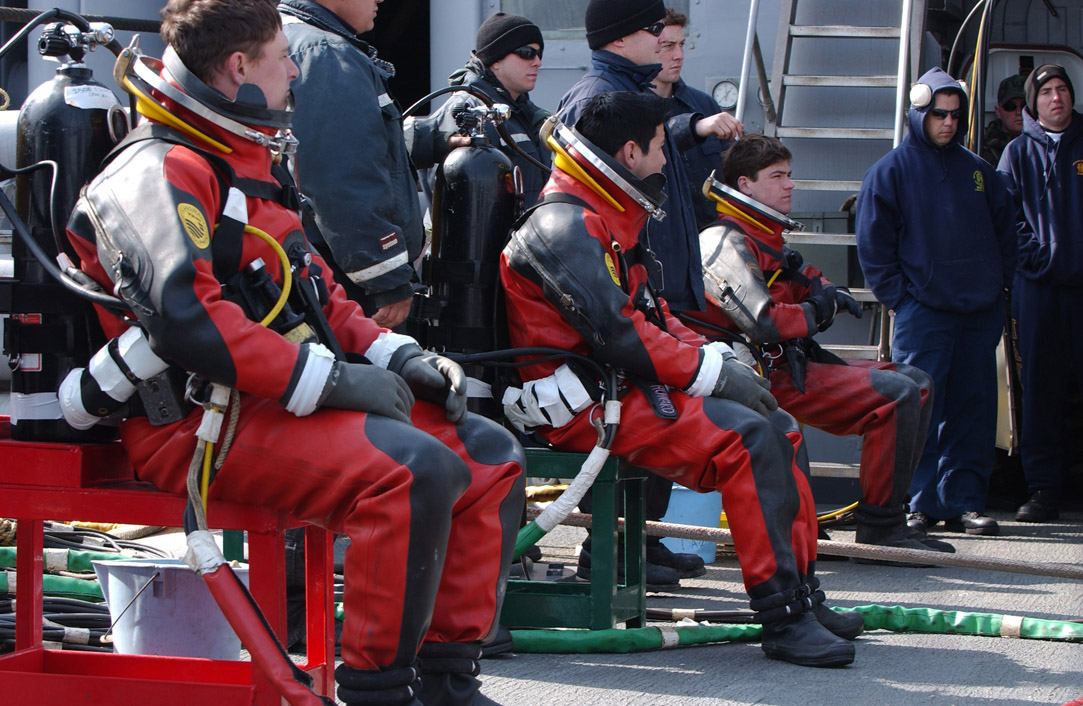
U.S. Navy divers in dry suits prepare to dive

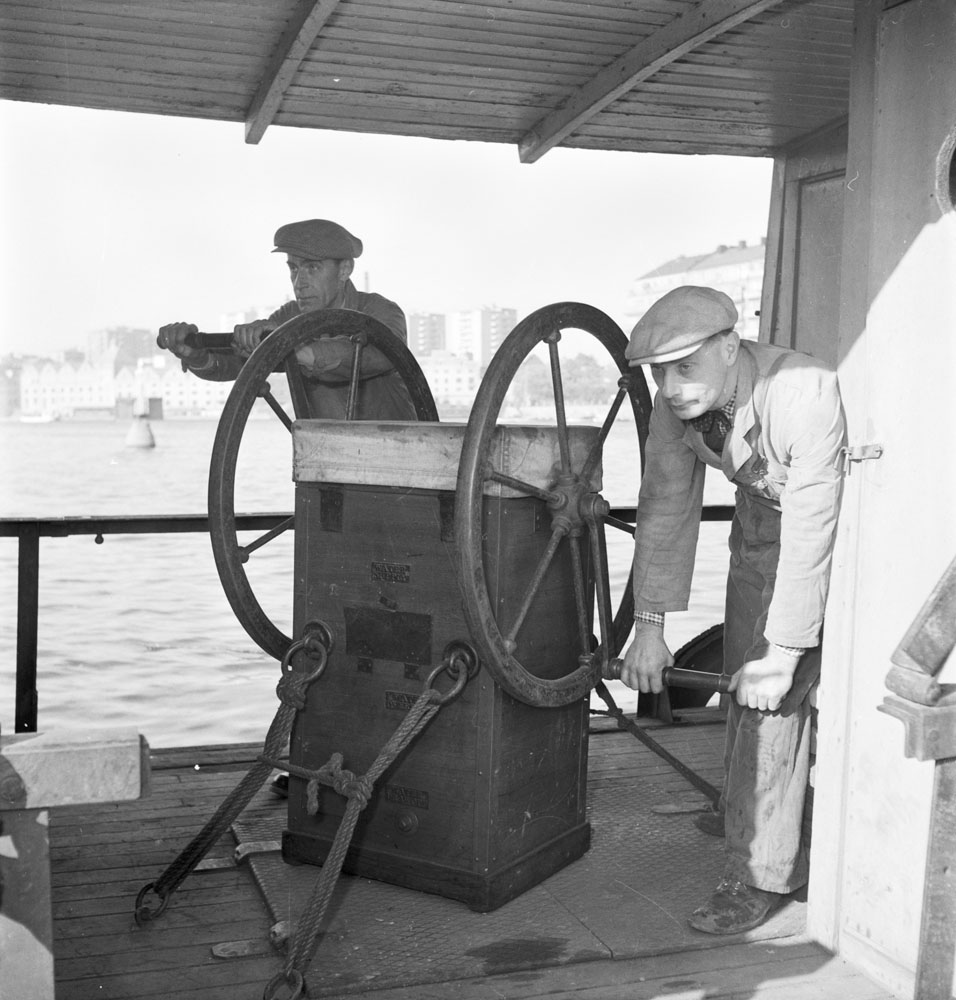
Two men operating a rotary diver's air pump

=== Diving equipment ===
Diving equipment – Equipment used to facilitate underwater diving

- Autonomous underwater vehicle – Uncrewed underwater vehicle with autonomous guidance system
- Breathing gas – Gas used for human respiration
- Buoyancy control device – Equipment for controlling the buoyancy of a diver
- Decompression equipment – Equipment used by divers to facilitate decompression
- Dive light – Light used underwater by a diver
- Diver propulsion vehicle – Powered device for diver mobility and range extension
- Diving bell – Chamber for transporting divers vertically through the water
  - Dry bell, also known as closed bell – Hyperbaric chamber for transporting diversvertically through the water
  - Wet bell, also known as open bell – Platform for transporting divers vertically through the water
- Diving mask – Face cover to improve underwater vision
  - Anti-fog – Chemicals that prevent the condensation of water as small droplets on a surface
  - Full-face diving mask – Diving mask that covers the mouth as well as the eyes and nose
  - Integrated Diver Display Mask – Diving half-mask with integrated head-up instrument display
- Diving safety equipment – Equipment used to facilitate underwater diving safety
- Diving suit – Garment or device designed to protect a diver from the underwater environment
  - Atmospheric diving suit – Articulated pressure-resistant anthropomorphic housing for an underwater diver
  - Dry suit – Watertight clothing that seals the wearer from cold and hazardous liquids
  - Hot water suit – A wetsuit with a supply of heated water to keep a diver warm
  - Rash guard, also known as rash vest – Stretch garment for protection from abrasion, UV and stings
  - Wetsuit – Garment worn to provide thermal protection while wet
  - Standard diving dress – Copper helmet with rubberised canvas diving suit and weighted boots
- Diving weighting system – Ballast carried to counteract buoyancy
  - Ankle weights (diving) – Diver trim weights worn at the ankles
  - Clip-on weight – Small weights used to make fine adjustments to a diver's ballast
  - Clump weight – A heavy weight suspended on cable used to guide a diving bell
  - Helmet weight – Ballast added to a diving helmet to prevent it from floating
  - Integrated weights, also known as BCD integrated weights, or pocket weights – Diving weights carried in pockets on the buoyancy compensator
  - Keel weight (diving) – Weight added to a diver's backplate
  - Tank weight, also known as cylinder weight – Ballast weight attached to a scuba cylinder
  - Trim weights (diving) – Diving weights distributed primarily to improve trim
  - Weight belt – Ballast carried to counteract buoyancy
  - Weight pocket – Container on diving equipment to hold ballast
  - Weighted shoes (diving), also known as Weighted boots (diving) – Shoes with heavy metal soles used as part of a diver's weights
  - Weight harness – Webbing system to support diver ballast weights
  - Diving weight – Ballast carried by a diver to counteract buoyancy or adjust trim
- Remotely operated underwater vehicle – Tethered underwater mobile device operated by a remote crew
- Snorkel – Tube for breathing face down at the surface of the water
- Swimfin – Footwear used for personal propulsion through water
  - Monofin – Single blade swimfin attached to both feet
- Towboard – Underwater survey equipment used to tow a diver
- Underwater breathing apparatus – Equipment which provides breathing gas to an underwater diver
  - Scuba set – Self-contained underwater breathing apparatus
    - Diving cylinder – Container to supply high pressure gas for diving operations
    - Diving regulator – Mechanism that controls the pressure of a breathing gas supply for diving
    - Rebreather – Portable apparatus to recycle breathing gas
  - Surface-supplied diving equipment – Equipment used specifically for surface supplied diving
    - Diving helmet – Rigid head enclosure for underwater diving
    - Diver's umbilical – Hose supplying breathing gas to a diver from the support platform
- Atmospheric diving suit (ADS) – Articulated pressure-resistant anthropomorphic housing for an underwater diver
- Crewed submersible – Small watercraft able to navigate under water

==== Autonomous underwater vehicles ====
Autonomous underwater vehicle – Uncrewed underwater vehicle with autonomous guidance system

- Autonomous Robotics Ltd – UK company developing an autonomous underwater vehicle
- AUV-150 – Unmanned underwater vehicle
- AUV Abyss – Autonomous underwater vehicle for mapping of the seabed and water column data collection
- Boaty McBoatface – British autonomous underwater vehicle
- DeepC – Autonomous underwater vehicle powered by a fuel cell
- DEPTHX – Autonomous underwater vehicle for exploring sinkholes in Mexico
- Echo Ranger – Marine autonomous underwater vehicle built by Boeing
- Eelume – Autonomous underwater vehicle being developed by Eelume AS
- Explorer AUV – Autonomous underwater vehicle from People's Republic of China
- Intelligent Water class AUV – Autonomous underwater vehicle for the People's Liberation Army Navy
- Intervention AUV – Type of autonomous underwater vehicle capable of autonomous interventions
- iRobot Seaglider – Deep diving autonomous underwater vehicle for long term missions
- Maya AUV India – Autonomous underwater vehicle from National Institute of Oceanography, India
- Nereus (underwater vehicle) – Hybrid remotely operated or autonomous underwater vehicle
- REMUS (AUV) – Autonomous underwater vehicle series
- Sentry (AUV) – Autonomous underwater vehicle
- Spindle (vehicle) – Ice penetrating two-stage autonomous underwater vehicle
- SPURV – Self propelled underwater research vehicle built in 1957 for the US Navy
- SPURV II – Special purpose underwater research vessel built to srudy submarine wakes
- Theseus (AUV) – Large autonomous underwater vehicle for laying fibre-optic cable

==== Breathing gas ====
Breathing gas – Gas used for human respiration

- Breathing gases by composition:
  - Argox – Gas mixture occasionally used by scuba divers for dry-suit inflation
  - Breathing air – Air quality suitable for safe breathing
  - Heliox – Breathing gas mixed from helium and oxygen
  - Hydreliox – Breathing gas mixture of hydrogen, helium, and oxygen
  - Hydrox (breathing gas) – Breathing gas mixture experimentally used for very deep diving
  - Nitrox – Breathing gas, mixture of nitrogen and oxygen
  - Oxygen
  - Trimix (breathing gas) – Breathing gas consisting of oxygen, helium and nitrogen
- Breathing gases by use:
  - Bailout gas – Emergency breathing gas supply carried by the diver
  - Bottom gas – Gas breathed during the deep part of a dive
  - Decompression gas – Oxygen-rich gas used for accelerated decompression
  - Emergency gas supply – Alternative independent breathing gas supply carried by a diver
  - Travel gas – Gas breathed during the descent part of a dive

==== Decompression equipment ====
Decompression equipment – Equipment used by divers to facilitate decompression

- Airlock – Compartment for transfer between environments with different atmospheres
- Bottom timer, also known as dive timer – An electronic instrument that records depth and elapsed time data on an underwater dive
- Deck decompression chamber, also known as decompression chamber – Hyperbaric chamber suitable for surface decompression or emergency use at a dive site
- Decompression buoy – Inflatable surface marker buoy deployed from underwater
- Decompression cylinder – Scuba cylinder carrying decompression gas
- Decompression gas – Oxygen-rich gas used for accelerated decompression
- Decompression trapeze – Horizontal bars suspended at decompression stop depths
- Depth gauge – Instrument that indicates depth below a reference surface
- Dive computer, also known as decompression computer – Instrument to calculate decompression status in real time
- Dive tables, also known as decompression tables, decompression schedules – Data used to determine a decompression schedule for a given dive profile and breathing gas
- Diving bell – Chamber for transporting divers vertically through the water
  - Closed bell, also known as dry bell – Hyperbaric chamber for transporting divers vertically through the water
  - Wet bell, also known as open bell – Platform for transporting divers vertically through the water
- Diving chamber – Hyperbaric pressure vessel for human occupancy used in diving operations
- Diving shot, also known as Shot line – Substantial weighted near-vertical line with buoy
- Diving stage, also known as diving basket – Platform on which a diver is transported vertically through the water
- Jonline – A short line used by scuba divers to clip themselves to something
- Pneumofathometer – Instrument for measuring the depth of a diver by air pressure
- Recreational Dive Planner – Decompression table for divers
- Saturation system – Diving decompression system

==== Diver propulsion vehicles ====
Diver propulsion vehicle – Powered device for diver mobility and range extension

- Advanced SEAL Delivery System – Former Navy SEAL mini-sub deployed from submarines
- Shallow Water Combat Submersible – Manned submersible and a type of swimmer delivery vehicle
- Wet sub – Ambient pressure diver propulsion vehicle
  - Cosmos CE2F series – Italian swimmer delivery vehicles
  - Human torpedo – Early form of diver propulsion vehicle
  - Motorised Submersible Canoe – WWII British frogman delivery vehicle
  - Necker Nymph – DeepFlight Merlin class positively-buoyant open-cockpit 3-seater wet sub
  - R-2 Mala-class swimmer delivery vehicle – Underwater diver propulsion equipment
  - SEAL Delivery Vehicle – Manned wet submersible for deploying naval special forces
  - Siluro San Bartolomeo – Italian manned torpedo design of late WWII
  - Wet Nellie – 1976 car-shaped submarine from the James Bond film The Spy Who Loved Me

==== Diving safety equipment ====
Diving safety equipment – Equipment used to facilitate underwater diving safety

- Adjustable buoyancy life jacket (ABLJ) – Chest inflation type buoyancy compensator
- Alternative air source – Emergency supply of breathing gas for an underwater diver
- AR vest, also known as Arvest and R vest – Type of jacket harness for surface-supplied diving
- Bailout cylinder, also known as bailout bottle – Emergency gas supply cylinder carried by a diver
- Buddy line – A tether between two scuba divers to prevent separation in low visibility
- Buoyancy compensator (diving) (BC, BCD), also known as buoyancy control device – Equipment for controlling the buoyancy of a diver
- Decompression equipment – Equipment used by divers to facilitate decompression
  - Decompression buoy (DSMB), also known as Delayed surface marker buoy – Inflatable surface marker buoy deployed from underwater
  - Decompression trapeze – Horizontal bars suspended at decompression stop depths
- Distance line, also known as dive reel or guide line – Line deployed by scuba divers for navigation
- Diver surface detection aids – Equipment to make a surfaced diver easier to find
- Diver's cutting tool – A tool to assist in extricating the diver from entrapment by lines or nets
- Diver's knife – A tool to assist in extricating the diver from entrapment by lines or nets
- Diving safety harness, also known as bell harness – A harness by which the diver can safely be lifted
- Jonline – A short line used by scuba divers to clip themselves to something
- Jacket harness – Type of surface-supplied diving safety harness
- Jump jacket – Surface-supplied diving safety harness with buoyancy compensation
- Lifeline, also known as tether – A rope connecting the diver to an attendant, usually at the surface
- Line marker – Marker used on cave guide lines to provide safety information to divers
- Rescue tether – Equipment to facilitate a diver rescue
- Shotline – Substantial weighted near-vertical line with buoy
- Safety sausage – Inflatable buoy used by a diver at the surface to indicate position to the dive boat
- Surface marker buoy – Buoy towed by a scuba diver to indicate position

==== Historical diving equipment ====
- Motorised Submersible Canoe – WWII British frogman delivery vehicle
- Necker Nymph – DeepFlight Merlin class positively-buoyant open-cockpit 3-seater wet sub
- R-2 Mala-class swimmer delivery vehicle – Underwater diver propulsion equipment
- Siluro San Bartolomeo – Italian manned torpedo design of late WWII
- Standard diving dress – Copper helmet with rubberised canvas diving suit and weighted boots
- Sub Marine Explorer – Early submarine craft
- Wet Nellie – 1976 car-shaped submarine from the James Bond film The Spy Who Loved Me

==== Rebreather types and components ====
Diving rebreather – Closed or semi-closed circuit scuba

- Bailout valve (rebreather) (BoV), also known as Rebreather bailout valve – Valve on rebreather mouthpiece to switch to emergency gas supply
- Carbon dioxide scrubber – Device which absorbs carbon dioxide from circulated gas
- Counterlung – Volume compensating device in a rebreather
- Closed circuit bailout – Emergency gas supply from an independent closed circuit rebreather
- Closed circuit rebreather – Breathing apparatus that recirculated breathing gas
  - Elecrtonically controlled closed circuit rebreather (ECCCR) – Underwater breathing apparatus
  - Manually controlled closed circuit rebreather (MCCCR) – Rebreather in which the oxygen content of the loop gas is controlled by the diver
- Cryogenic rebreather – Rebreather that removes CO2 by freezing it out using heat exchange with liquid oxygen
- Dive/surface valve – Valve on a rebreather mouthpiece to isolate the breathing loop when not in use
- Gas extender – Type of semi-closed circuit diving rebreather
- Head-up display (HUD) – Transparent display presenting data within normal sight lines of the user
  - Rebreather head-up display – User information interface always in view of the diver
- Loop rebreather – Rebreather architecture with one-way flow
- Mixed gas rebreather – Rebreather using gas other than only oxygen
- Oxygen rebreather – Rebreather using pure oxygen as the breathing gas
- Pendulum rebreather – Configuration using biderctional gas flow
- Semi-closed rebreather – Rebreather that replenishes oxygen by continuously adding a gas mixture
  - Active addition semi-closed circuit rebreather – Adds feed gas to the breathing circuit and excess gas is dumped
  - Passive addition semi-closed circuit rebreather – Dumps gas from the breathing circuit and makes up volume on demand

==== Rebreather makes and models ====
- Carleton CDBA – Military rebreather by Cobham plc
- Clearance Divers Life Support Equipment – British military electronically controlled closed circuit rebreather
- Cis-Lunar – Manufacturer of electronically controlled closed-circuit rebreathers for scuba diving
- CUMA – Canadian military diving rebreather
- Davis Submerged Escape Apparatus – Oxygen rebreather
- Dräger Dolphin – Semi-closed circuit recreational diving rebreather
- Dräger Ray – Semi-closed circuit diving rebreather
- FROGS – Closed circuit oxygen diving rebreather
- Halcyon RB80 – Non-depth-compensated passive addition semi-closed circuit rebreather
- Halcyon PVR-BASC – Semi-closed circuit depth compensated passive addition diving rebreather
- IDA71 – Russian military rebreather for underwater and high altitude use
- Interspiro DCSC – Military semi-closed circuit passive addition diving rebreather
- KISS – Manufacturer of recreational/technical mixed gas rebreathers
- LAR-5, LAR-6, and LAR-V represented by Dräger (company) – German manufacturer of breathing equipment
- Lambertsen Amphibious Respiratory Unit – Early closed circuit oxygen diving rebreather
- Porpoise – Australian scuba manufacturer
- Siebe Gorman CDBA – Type of diving rebreather used by the Royal Navy
- Siva – Range of military rebreathers
- Viper – Electronically-controlled closed circuit mixed gas military rebreather

Gas extenders:

- Mk V Mod 1 Heliox helmet – US Navy standard diving helmet modified for heliox
  - Hoke valve – Gas recirculation control valve on MK V helium hemet
- Morse Engineering Mk 12 helmet – US Navy deep water free-flow helmet
- Dräger Modell 1915 Bubikopf helmet – Copper helmet for rebreather systems
  - Dräger DM20 oxygen rebreather system – Oxygen rebreather system for copper helmet
  - Dräger DM40 mixed gas rebreather system – Nitrox rebreather system for copper helmet

==== Remotely operated underwater vehicles ====
Remotely operated underwater vehicle – Tethered underwater mobile device operated by a remote crew

- 8A4-class ROUV – Chinese work class remotely operated underwater vehicle
- ABISMO – Japanese remotely operated underwater vehicle for deep sea exploration
- Atlantis ROV Team – High-school underwater robotics team from Whidbey Island, Washington, United States
- CURV – Early remotely operated underwater vehicle
- Épaulard – French remotely operated underwater vehicle of the Ifremer
- Global Explorer ROV – Deep water science and survey remotely operated vehicle
- Goldfish-class ROUV – Light class of Chinese remotely operated underwater vehicle
- Kaikō ROV – Japanese remotely operated underwater vehicle for deep sea exploration
- AN/BLQ-11 Long-Term Mine Reconnaissance System – American torpedo tube-launched underwater search and survey unmanned undersea vehicle
- Mini Rover ROV – Small, low cost observation class remotely operated underwater vehicle
- OpenROV – Open-source remotely operated underwater vehicle
- ROV KIEL 6000 – Remotely operated undersea vehicle
- ROV PHOCA – Remotely operated underwater vehicle of the COMANCHE type
- Scorpio ROV – Work class remotely operated underwater vehicle
- Sea Dragon-class ROV – Chinese deep diving work class remotely operated underwater vehicle
- Seabed tractor – Special purpose class of remotely operated underwater vehicle
- Seafox drone – Remotely operated anti-mine marine drone
- SeaPerch – Remotely operated underwater vehicle educational program
- SJT-class ROUV – Series of Chinese remotely operated underwater vehicles
- T1200 Trenching Unit – Remotely operated seabed trenching unit
- VideoRay UROVs – Series of inspection class remotely operated underwater vehicles

==== Underwater breathing apparatus ====
Underwater breathing apparatus – Equipment which provides breathing gas to an underwater diver

- Scuba set – Self-contained underwater breathing apparatus
  - Alternative air source – Emergency supply of breathing gas for an underwater diver
    - Bailout bottle, also known as bailout cylinder – Emergency gas supply cylinder carried by a diver
    - Emergency gas supply – Alternative independent breathing gas supply carried by a diver
    - Helicopter Aircrew Breathing Device – Small scuba device for escape from ditched helicopters
    - Pony bottle – Small independent scuba cylinder usually carried for emergency gas supply
    - Submarine escape set – Self contained breathing apparatus providing gas to escape from a submerged submarine
  - Backplate and wing – Type of back-mount scuba harness
  - Diving cylinder – Container to supply high pressure gas for diving operations
    - Burst disc – Non-closing over-pressure relief device
    - Cylinder valve alias Pillar valve represented by Diving cylinder#The cylinder valve – A valve to control gas flow to and from a cylinder and to connect with the regulator or filling hose
    - Hydrostatic test – Non-destructive test of pressure vessels
    - Sustained load cracking – Metallurgical failure mode of cracking under a prolonged static load
    - Testing and inspection of diving cylinders – Periodical inspection and testing to revalidate fitness for service
  - Diving regulator – Mechanism that controls the pressure of a breathing gas supply for diving
    - Breathing performance of regulators – Capacity of breathing regulators to function as specified
  - Rebreather – Portable apparatus to recycle breathing gas
  - Scuba manifold – Scuba component used to functionally connect diving cylinders
  - Sidemount diving – Diving using equipment configuration where scuba sets are clipped to the diver's sides
- Surface-supplied diving equipment – Equipment used specifically for surface supplied diving
  - Air line, also known as air-line – Tube or hose carrying a compressed air supply
  - Bailout cylinder – Emergency gas supply cylinder carried by a diver
  - Bailout block – Valve block on diver's equipment for switching between main and emergency gas supply
  - Diving helmet – Rigid head enclosure for underwater diving
  - Diver's umbilical – Hose supplying breathing gas to a diver from the support platform
  - Diving stage – Platform on which a diver is transported vertically through the water
  - Gas panel – Breathing gas distribution panel for surface-supplied diving
  - Pneumofathometer – Instrument for measuring the depth of a diver by air pressure
  - Snuba – Limited depth airline breathing apparatus towed by the diver
  - Standard diving dress – Copper helmet with rubberised canvas diving suit and weighted boots

=== Diving support equipment ===
Diving support equipment – Equipment used in the support of an underwater diving operation

- Booster pump – Machine to increase pressure of a fluid
- Cascade filling system – Filling pressurized gas from a series of storage cylinders
- Communications panel, also known as Diver's telephone – Surface control panel for underwater diving voice communications system
- Diver down flag – Flag signal indicating divers are in the water nearby
- Diver lock-out submersible – Manned submersible with an airlock for underwater use
- Diver's pump, also known as Diver's air pump – Manually powered surface air supply for divers
- Diving air compressor, also known as Diving compressor – Machine used to compress breathing air for use by underwater divers
- Diving chamber – Hyperbaric pressure vessel for human occupancy used in diving operations
  - Hyperbaric stretcher – Portable pressure vessel to transport a person under pressure
- Diving spread – The topside base for commercial diving operations
  - Air spread – The topside base for surface-supplied air diving operations
  - Saturation spread – The topside base for saturation diving operations
    - Saturation system – Diving decompression system
- Diving support vessel – Ship used as a floating base for professional diving projects
  - HMS Challenger – Royal Navy saturation diving support vessel
  - Liveaboard – Way of using a boat
  - Dive boat – Boat used for the support of scuba diving operations
    - Combat Rubber Raiding Craft – Rubberised fabric tactical inflatable boat used by the US Navy
  - Diving ladder – Ladder to facilitate egress from the water by divers
  - Diving platform (scuba) – Low freeboard platform on a dive boat to give divers easy access to the water
  - Moon pool – Opening in the base of a hull, platform, or chamber giving access to the water below
- Echo sounder, also known as fish finder – Method of measuring the depth of water
- Gas panel, also known as Diving gas distribution manifold – Breathing gas distribution panel for surface-supplied diving
- Helium analyzer – Instrument to measure the concentration of helium in a gas mixture
- Helium reclaim system – System to recover used breathing gas and prepare it for re-use
- Launch and recovery system (LARS) – Equipment used to deploy and recover a diving bell, stage, or ROV
- Marine VHF radio – Radios operating in the very high frequency maritime mobile band
- Nitrox production – Methods of producing nitrox mixtures
  - Membrane gas separation – Technology for splitting specific gases out of mixtures
  - Pressure swing adsorption – Method of gases separation using selective adsorption under pressure
- Proton magnetometer, also known as metal detector – Instrument which measures very small variations in the Earth's magnetic field
- Recreational Dive Planner (RDP) – Decompression table for divers
- Remotely operated underwater vehicle (ROV) – Tethered underwater mobile device operated by a remote crew
- Satellite navigation – Use of satellite signals for navigation or geo-spatial positioning
  - Global Positioning System (GPS) – American satellite-based radio navigation service
- Subsurface (software) – Open source software for logging and planning scuba dives
- Trongle – Device used on submarines to help swimmers to locate a submerged submarine

==== Underwater work tools and equipment ====
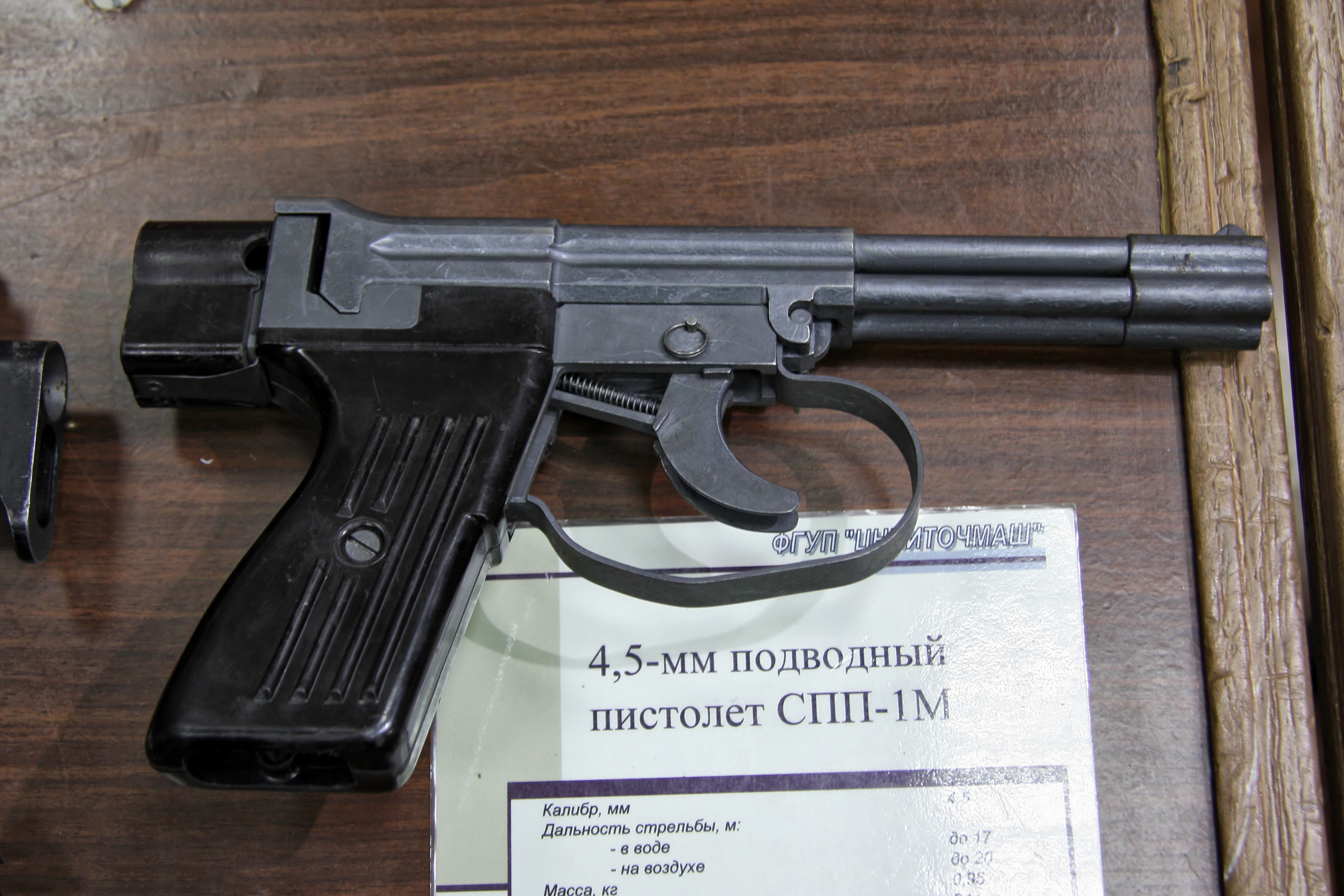
Soviet SPP-1 underwater pistol

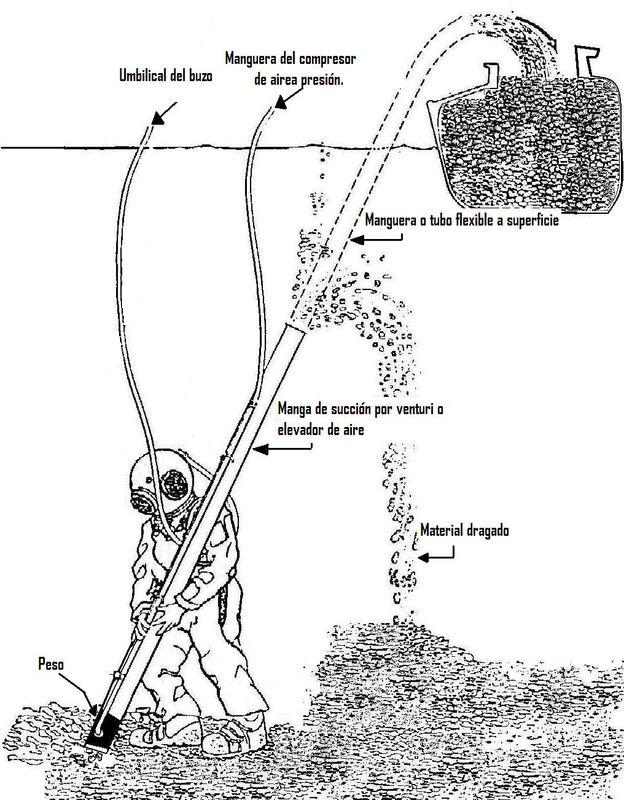
Airlift dredging

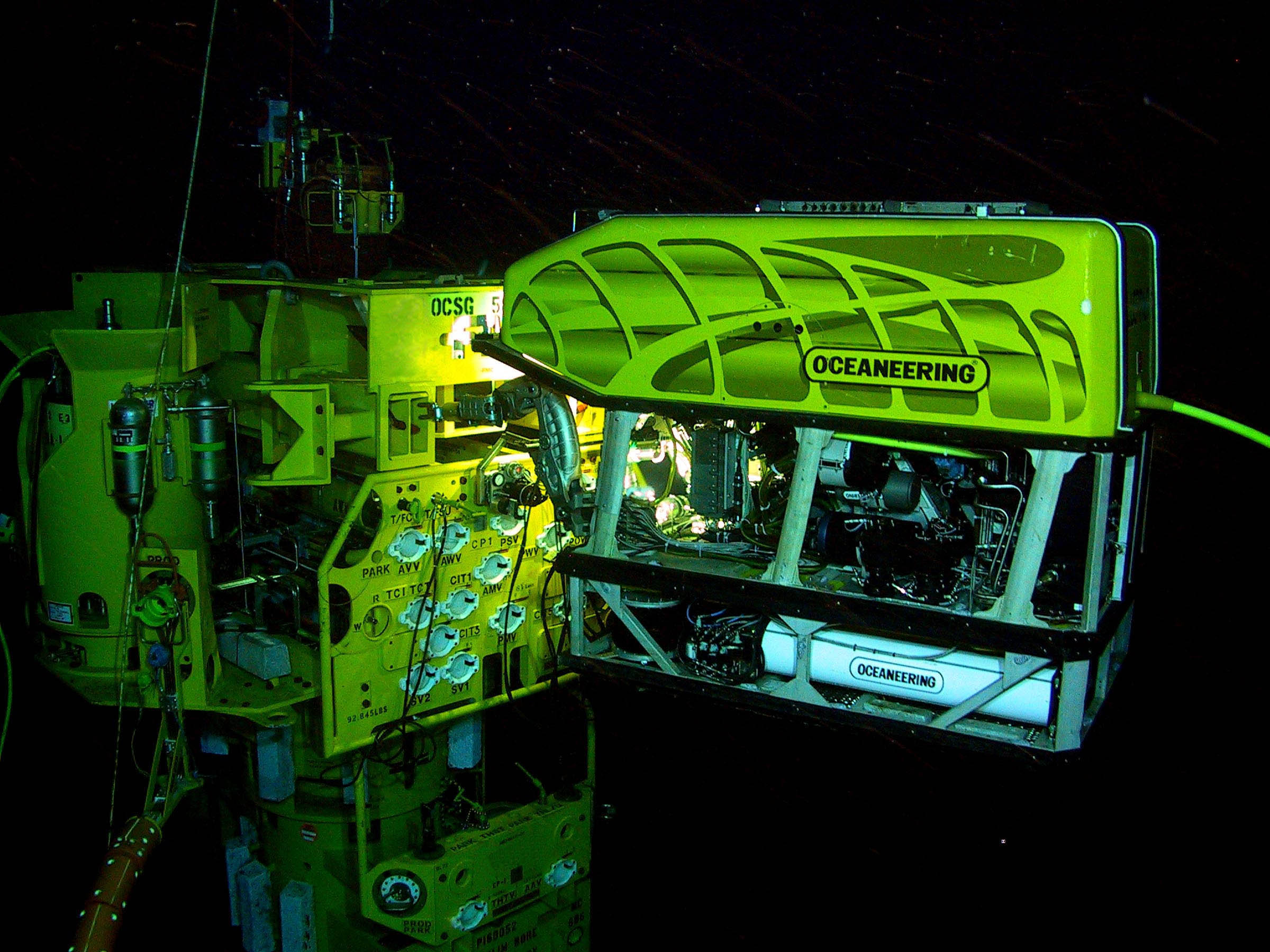
ROV at work in an underwater oil and gas field. The ROV is operating a subsea torque tool (wrench) on a valve on the subsea structure.

Underwater work tools and equipment – Tools and equipment used for underwater work

- Airlift (dredging device) – Dredging device using injected air to move water and entrained load up a pipe
- High-pressure water jetting – Cleaning method using very high pressure water jet
- Lifting bag – Airtight bag used for underwater buoyant lifting when filled with air
- Remotely operated underwater vehicle – Tethered underwater mobile device operated by a remote crew
- Snoopy loop – Rubber band made from inner tube
- Tremie – Equipment for underwater concrete placement

==== Underwater weapons ====
Underwater weapons – Weapons that are intended for use underwater

- Limpet mine – Naval mine attached to a target by magnets
- Speargun – Underwater fishing implement
  - Hawaiian sling – Simple form of underwater speargun
  - Polespear – Basic rubber launched underwater fishing spear
- Underwater firearm – Firearms that can be effectively fired underwater
  - Gyrojet – Firearm firing gyroscopic rockets in the 1960s
  - Mk 1 Underwater Defense Gun – Underwater firearm developed by the United States during the Cold War
  - Powerhead (firearm) – Specialized firearm used underwater
  - Underwater pistols
    - Heckler & Koch P11 – Five-barreled underwater rocket dart pistol
    - SPP-1 underwater pistol – Soviet four-barreled underwater dart derringer pistol
  - Underwater revolvers
    - AAI underwater revolver – Six-round amphibious revolver for naval use
  - Underwater rifles
    - ADS amphibious rifle – Russian bullpup assault rifle for combat divers
    - APS underwater rifle – Soviet underwater assault firearm firing unrifled steel flechettes
    - ASM-DT amphibious rifle – Russian folding stock underwater firearm

== Diving support personnel ==
There are also diver support activities which require assessed competence and registration for which formal training may be required.

- Diving team – Group of people working together to enhance dive safety and achieve a task
  - Bellman (diving) – The member of a dive team who acts as stand-by diver and tender from the diving bell
  - Compressor operator – Person competent to operate a diving air compressor
  - Diver's attendant, also known as dive tender – Assistant for a diver
  - Diving medical examiner – A medical practitioner registered to assess medical fitness to dive
  - Diving medical practitioner – Specialist in diagnosis, treatment and prevention of disorders caused by underwater diving
  - Diving Medical Technician, also known as Diver medic – Person trained in advanced first aid for divers
  - Diving safety officer – Administrator of a US university's research diving safety program
  - Diving supervisor – Professional diving team leader responsible for safety
  - Diving systems technician – A competent person who maintains and repairs diving life-support equipment
  - Gas man (diving), also known as gas panel operator, rack operator, or diving gas supply manifold operator – Member of a surface-supplied diving team who operates the breathing gas panel
  - Life support technician – A member of a saturation diving team who operates the surface habitat
  - Stand-by diver – A member of a dive team who is ready to assist or rescue the working diver
- Scuba gas blender – Person competent to blend breathing gases for scuba diving
  - Nitrox blender – Person competent to blend nitrox for scuba diving
  - Trimix blender – Person competent to blend trimix breathing gases for scuba diving
- Dive boat skipper – Person in command of a dive boat
- Divemaster, also known as dive leader, dive guide – Recreational dive leader certification and role

== Science of underwater diving ==
=== The diving environment ===
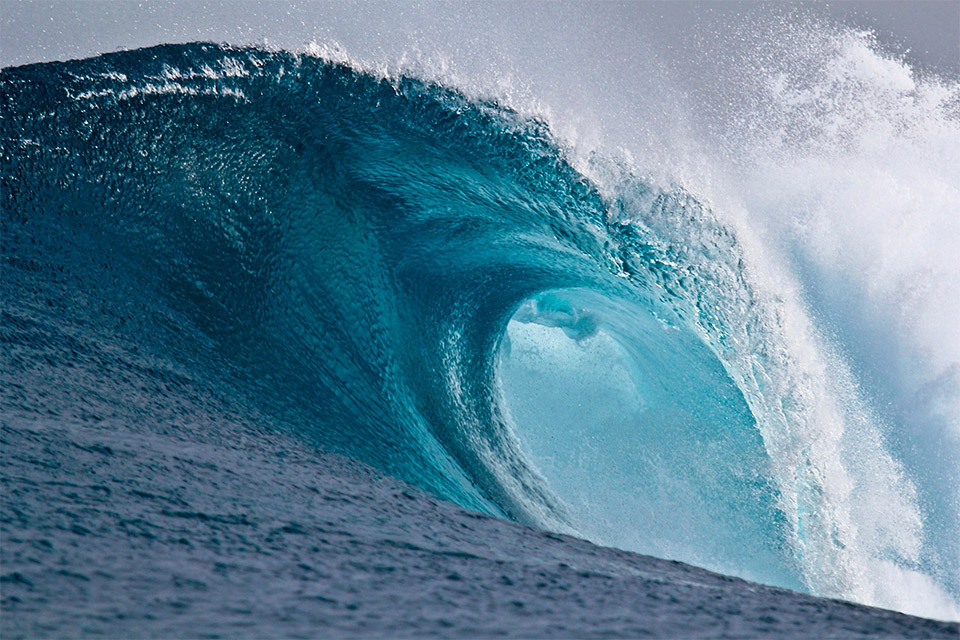
Plunging breaker

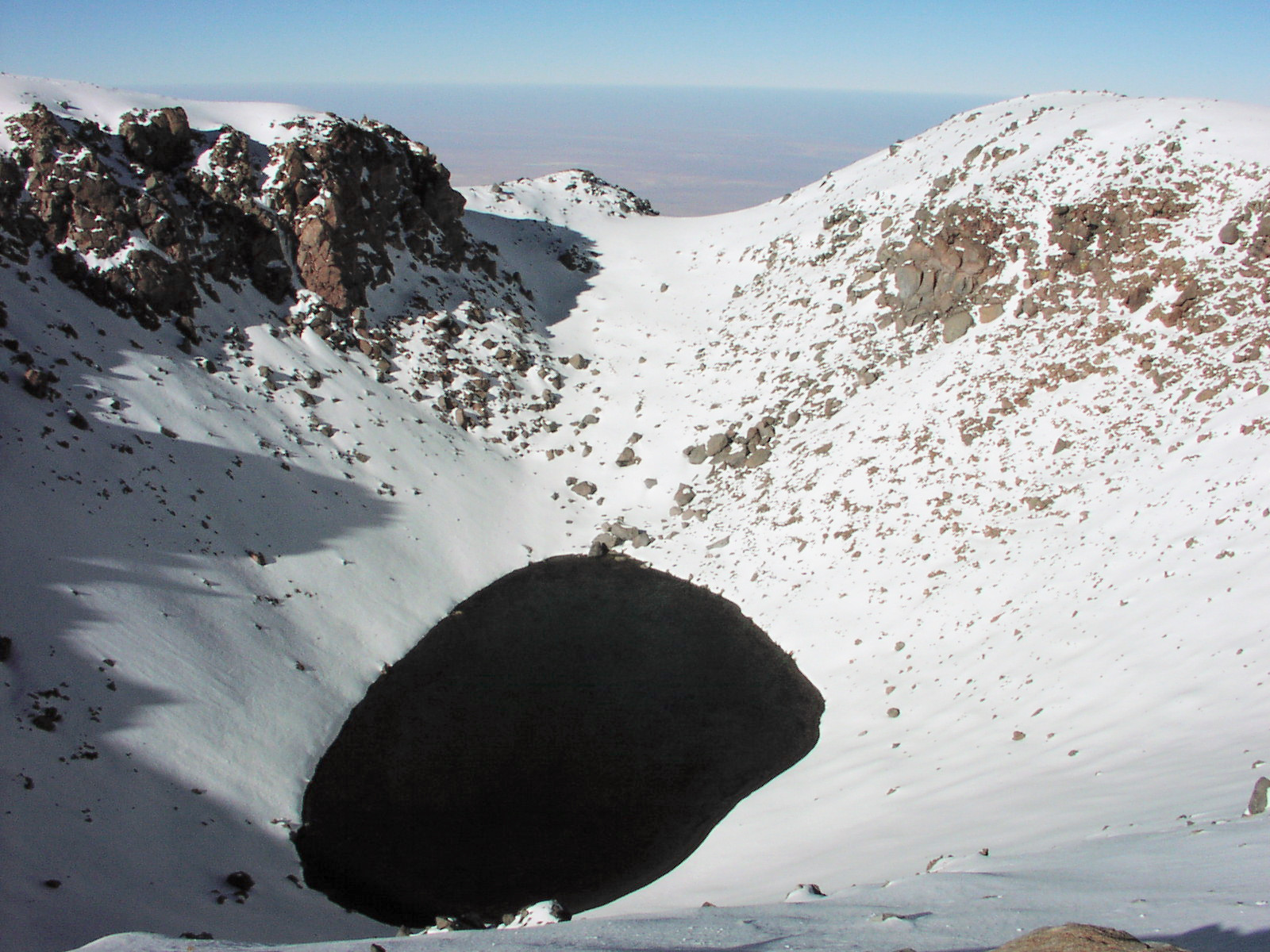
Lago Licancabur, site of world's highest ever altitude dive.

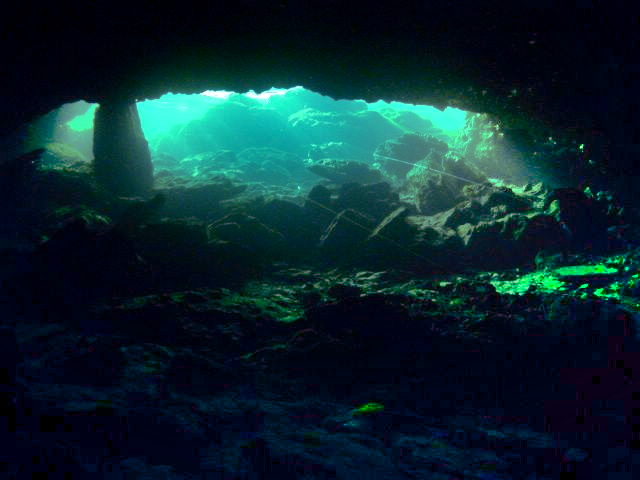
Entrance to Peacock Springs Cave System

Underwater diving environment – Underwater environment to which a diver may be exposed

- List of diving environments by type – Variety of environments that people may dive in
- Underwater environment – Aquatic or submarine environment
- Open-water diving – Diving with access to breathable air of the atmosphere
- Altitude diving – Underwater diving at altitudes above 300 m
- Cave diving – Diving in water-filled caves
- Deep diving – Underwater diving to a depth beyond the norm
- Ice diving – Underwater diving under ice
- Muck diving – Recreational diving on a loose sedimentary bottom
- Night diving – Underwater diving during the hours of darkness
- Recreational dive sites – Places that divers go to enjoy the underwater environment
- Wreck diving – Recreational diving on wrecks
- Physical and biological aspects of the diving environment
  - Algal bloom – Spread of planktonic algae in water
  - Breaking wave, also known as Surf – Unstable wave
  - Ocean current – Directional mass flow of oceanic water
  - Current (stream) – Flow of water in a natural watercourse due to gravity
  - Ekman transport – Net transport of surface water perpendicular to wind direction
  - Halocline – Stratification of a body of water due to salinity differences
  - Hazards of the aquatic environment represented by List of diving hazards and precautions#The aquatic environment –
  - Hazards of the specific diving environment represented by List of diving hazards and precautions#The specific diving environment –
  - List of diving hazards and precautions – Hazards associated with underwater diving
  - Longshore current – Sediment moved by the longshore current
  - Overfall current – A turbulent area of water caused by a strong current over an underwater ridge, or by currents meeting.
  - Rip current – Water current moving away from shore
  - Stratification – Layering of a body of water due to density variations
  - Surge (wave action) currently represented by Waves and shallow water – the component of wave motion in the direction of wave front propagation particularly close to and parallel with the bottom
  - Thermocline – Distinct layer of temperature change in a body of water
  - Tidal race – Fast-moving tidal flow
  - Tide – Change in sea level due to gravity
  - Turbidity – Cloudiness of a fluid
  - Undertow (water waves) – Return flow below nearshore water waves
  - Upwelling – Oceanographic phenomenon of wind-driven motion of ocean water

=== Physics of underwater diving ===
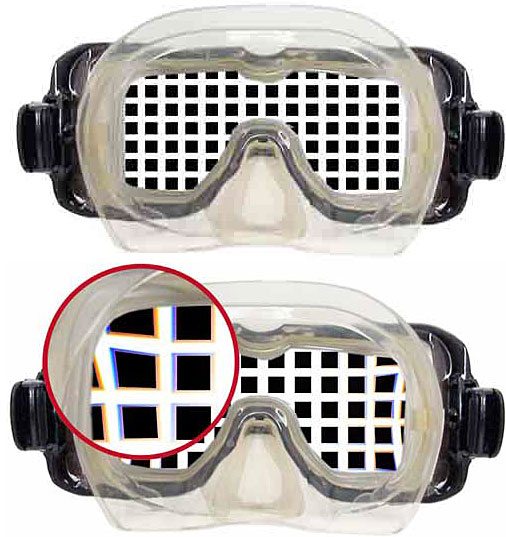
Views through a flat mask, above and below water

Physics of underwater diving – Aspects of physics which affect the underwater diver

- Buoyancy – Upward force that opposes the weight of an object immersed in fluid
  - Archimedes' principle – Buoyancy principle in fluid dynamics
  - Neutral buoyancy – Equilibrium between buoyancy and weight of an immersed object
- Diffusion – Transport of dissolved species from the highest to the lowest concentration region
  - Molecular diffusion – Thermal motion of liquid or gas particles at temperatures above absolute zero
  - Permeation – Penetration of a liquid, gas, or vapor through a solid
- Force – Influence that can change motion of an object
  - Weight – Force on a mass due to gravity
- Ideal gas law – Equation of the state of a hypothetical ideal gas
  - Combined gas law – Combination of Charles', Boyle's and Gay-Lussac's gas laws
  - Amontons' law – Relationship between pressure and temperature of a gas at constant volume
  - Boyle's law – Relation between gas pressure and volume
  - Charles's law – Relationship between volume and temperature of a gas at constant pressure
  - Gay-Lussac's law – Relationship between pressure and temperature of a gas at constant volume
- Pressure – Force distributed over an area
  - Ambient pressure – Pressure of the surrounding medium
  - Atmospheric pressure – Static pressure exerted by the weight of Earth's atmosphere
  - Hydrostatic pressure – Physical quantity
    - Metre sea water – Unit of pressure equal to one tenth of a bar
  - Partial pressure – Pressure of a component gas in a mixture
    - Dalton's law – Empirical law of partial pressures
    - Oxygen fraction – Volumetric proportion of oxygen to other constituents in a breathing gas
  - Torricellian chamber – Low pressure air space in a flooded cave chamber
- Psychrometric constant – Relation of the partial pressure of water in air to temperature
- Solubility – Capacity of a substance to dissolve in a homogeneous way
  - Henry's law – Gas law regarding proportionality of dissolved gas
  - Solution – Homogeneous mixture of a solute and a solvent
  - Supersaturation – State of a solution that contains more solute than can be dissolved at equilibrium
- Surface tension – Tendency of a liquid surface to shrink to reduce surface area
  - Hydrophobe – Molecule or surface that has no attraction to water
  - Surfactant – Substance that lowers surface tension
- Underwater vision – Ability to see objects underwater
  - Snell's law, also known as Law of refraction – Formula for refraction angles
- Work of breathing (WoB) – Energy expended to inhale and exhale a breathing gas

=== Physiology of underwater diving ===
Diagram of the human circulatory system

Decompression profiles based on the Thermodynamic model compared with the US Navy table for the same depth and bottom time

Diagram of the human respiratory system

Human physiology of underwater diving – Influences of the underwater environment on the physiology of human divers

- Circulatory system – Organ system for circulating blood in animals
  - Patent foramen ovale – A heart defect present at birth
  - Blood–air barrier – Membrane separating alveolar air from blood in lung capillaries
  - Blood shift – Blood flow to the extremities redistributed to the head and torso during a breathhold dive
  - Perfusion – Passage of fluid through the circulatory or lymphatic system to an organ or tissue
  - Pulmonary circulation – Part of the vertebrate circulatory system
  - Systemic circulation – Portion of the cardiovascular system which circulates blood though most of the body
- Cold shock response – Physiological response to sudden exposure to cold
- Dead space (physiology) – Inhaled air volume not involved in gas exchange
- Diving reflex – Physiological responses to immersion of air-breathing vertebrates
- Metabolism – Set of chemical reactions in organisms
- Physiology of decompression – Physiological basis for decompression theory and practice
  - Decompression theory – Theoretical modelling of decompression physiology
    - Bühlmann decompression algorithm, also known as Buhlmann algorithm – Mathematical model of tissue inert gas uptake and release with pressure change
    - Equivalent air depth – Method of comparing decompression requirements for air and a given nitrox mix
    - Gradient factor in decompression modelling – A way for users to adjust the conservatism of a decompression algorithm in software
    - Haldane's decompression model – Decompression model developed by John Scott Haldane
    - Lipid – Organic compound that is soluble in nonpolar solvents
    - Oxygen window – Difference between the partial pressures of oxygen in arterial blood and body tissues
    - Reduced gradient bubble model – Decompression algorithm
    - Thalmann algorithm – Mathematical model for diver decompression
    - Thermodynamic model of decompression – Early diving decompression model
    - Uncontrolled decompression – Unplanned drop in the pressure of a sealed system
    - Varying Permeability Model – Decompression model and algorithm based on bubble physics
- Respiration (physiology) – Exchange of gases between environment and tissues
  - Artificial gills (human) – Hypothetical devices to extract oxygen from water
  - Breathing – Process of moving air in and out of the lungs
    - Work of breathing – Energy expended to inhale and exhale a breathing gas
  - Carbon dioxide retention – Abnormally high tissue carbon dioxide levels
  - Gas exchange – Process by which gases diffuse through a biological membrane
  - Hypocapnia – State of reduced carbon dioxide in the blood
  - Normocapnia – Normal arterial carbon dioxide levels
  - Respiratory exchange ratio – Ratio between the metabolic production of carbon dioxide and the uptake of oxygen
  - Respiratory quotient – Ratio of carbon dioxide produced by the body to oxygen consumed by the body
  - Respiratory system – Biological system in animals and plants for gas exchange
  - Tissue (biology) – Group of similar cells performing a specific function
- Underwater vision – Ability to see objects underwater

== Diving medicine, disorders and treatment ==
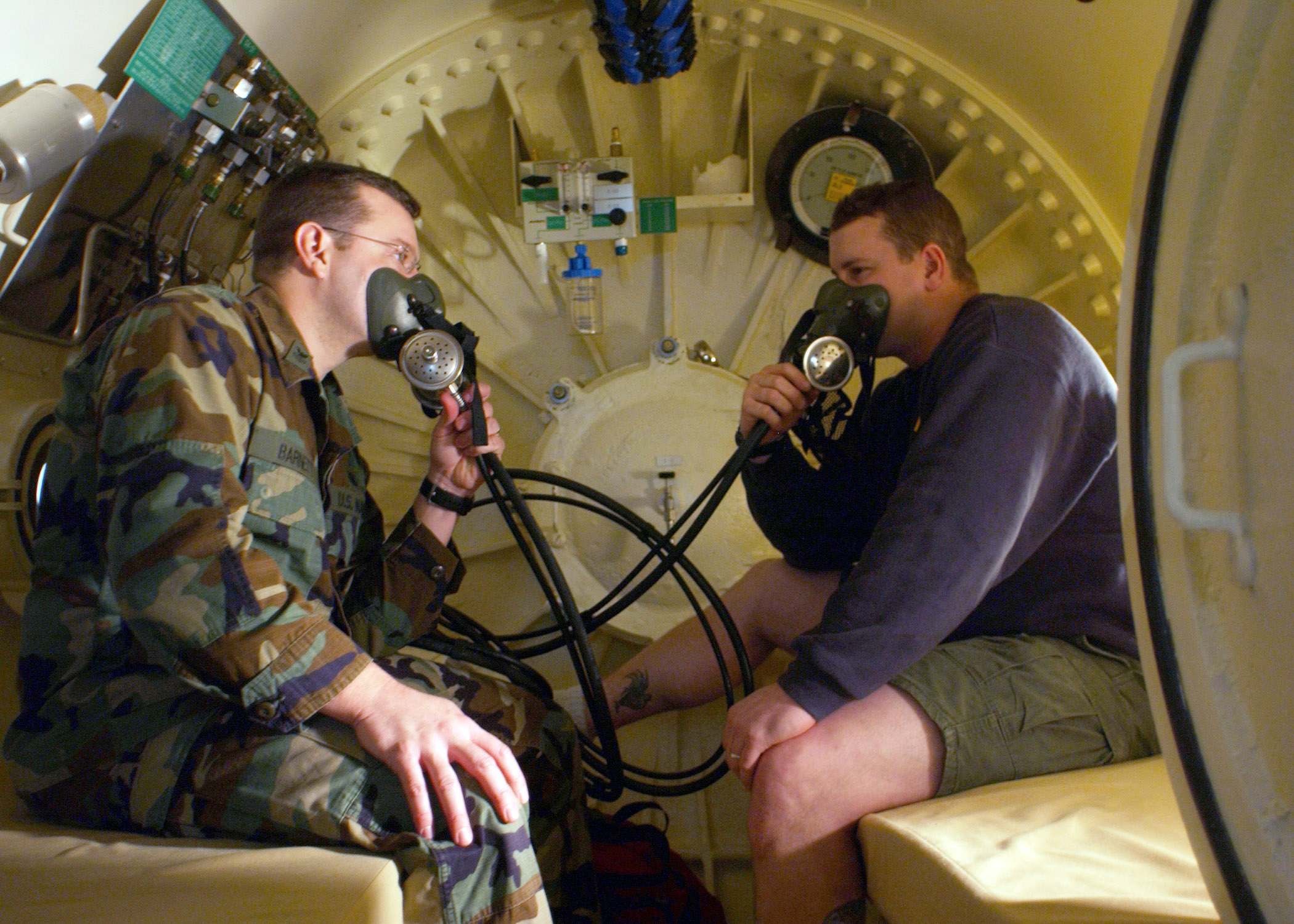
Oxygen therapy in a multiplace hyperbaric chamber is often delivered via built in breathing systems.

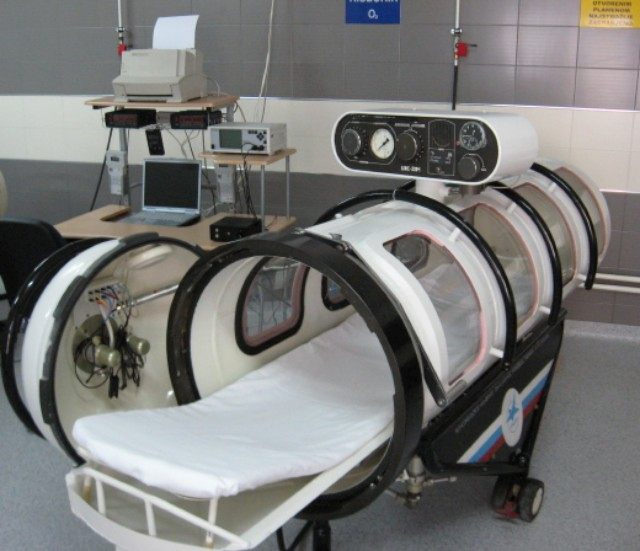
Monoplace chambers can be used for hyperbaric oxygen therapy if the patient is stable

=== Diving medicine ===
Diving medicine – Diagnosis, treatment and prevention of disorders caused by underwater diving

- Fitness to dive, also known as Medical fitness to dive – Medical fitness to function underwater
- Diving medical examiner – A medical practitioner registered to assess medical fitness to dive
- Diving medical practitioner – Specialist in diagnosis, treatment and prevention of disorders caused by underwater diving
- Diving medical technician – Person trained in advanced first aid for divers
- Hyperbaric medicine – Medical treatment at raised ambient pressure

=== Diving disorders and treatment ===
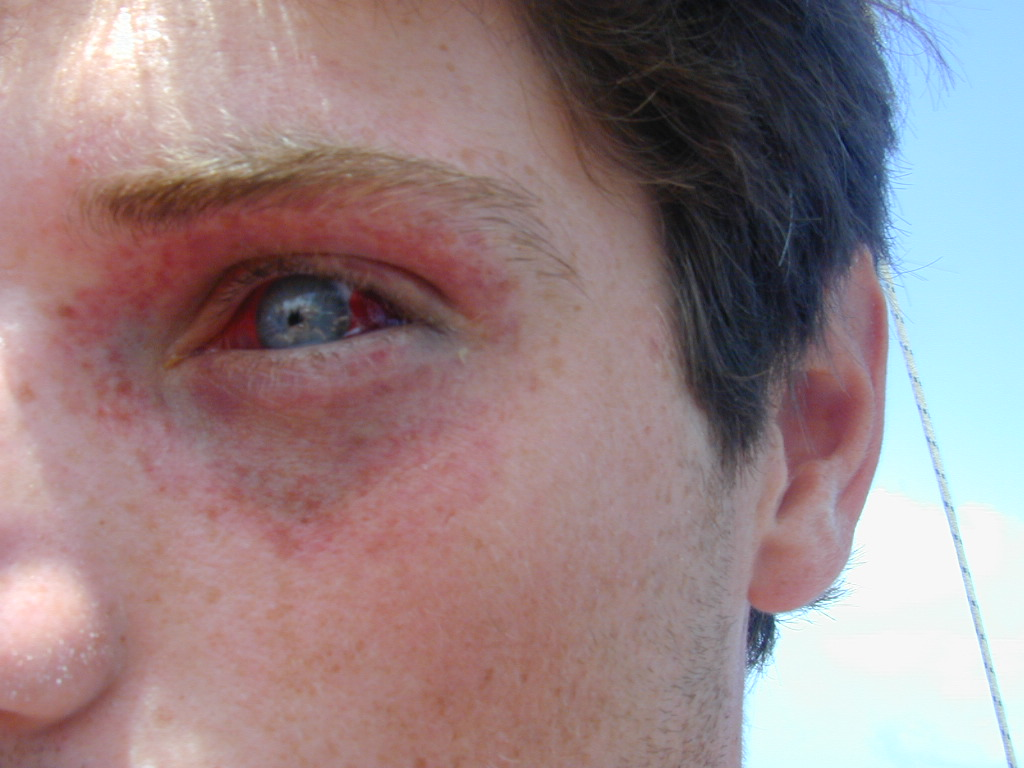
Mask squeeze - a mild form of barotrauma

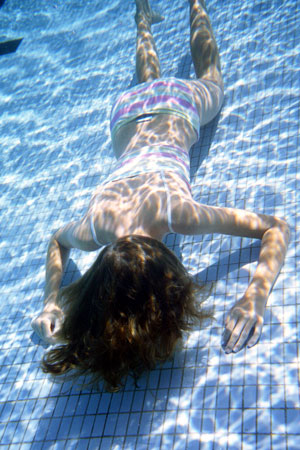
Staged image showing how victims may black out quietly underwater, often going unnoticed.

Diving disorders – Physiological disorders resulting from underwater diving

- List of signs and symptoms of diving disorders – Evidence of physiological disorders resulting from underwater diving
- Drowning – Respiratory impairment caused by submersion in liquid
  - Laryngospasm – Involuntary contraction of the vocal folds restricting inhalation
- Dysbarism – Medical conditions resulting from changes in ambient pressure
  - Barotrauma – Injury due to pressure difference between gas filled space and adjoining tissue
    - Arterial gas embolism – Vascular blockage by gas bubbles
    - Pulmonary barotrauma – Lung over-pressure and squeeze injuries
  - Compression arthralgia – Joint pain caused by fast compression to high ambient pressure
  - Decompression illness – Disorders arising from ambient pressure reduction
    - Decompression sickness – Disorder caused by dissolved gases forming bubbles in tissues
      - Dysbaric osteonecrosis – Ischemic bone disease caused by decompression bubbles
        - Avascular necrosis – Death of bone tissue due to interruption of the blood supply
      - Inner ear decompression sickness – Medical condition caused by inert gas bubbles forming out of solution
      - Isobaric counterdiffusion – Gaseous diffusion through body tissue at constant total pressure
      - Taravana – Decompression sickness caused by breath-hold diving
      - Therapeutic recompression – Recompression to reduce symptoms of decompression illness
        - Hyperbaric treatment schedules – Planned hyperbaric exposure using a specified breathing gas as medical treatment
        - In-water recompression – In-water treatment for decompression sickness
- Hypercapnia – Abnormally high tissue carbon dioxide levels
- Hypothermia – Human body core temperature below 35 °C (95 °F)
- Hypoxia (medicine) – Medical condition of lack of oxygen in the tissues
  - Freediving blackout – Loss of consciousness caused by cerebral hypoxia towards the end of a breath-hold dive
  - Latent hypoxia – Lung gas and blood oxygen concentration sufficient to support consciousness only at depth
- Motion sickness, also known as seasickness – Nausea caused by motion or perceived motion
- Oxygen therapy – Use of oxygen as a medical treatment
  - Built-in breathing system (BIBS) – System for supply of breathing gas on demand within a confined space
- Surfer's ear – Common name for an abnormal bone growth within the external ear canal
- Toxicity – Dose dependant harmfulness of substances
  - Carbon monoxide poisoning – Toxic effects of carbon monoxide
  - Nitrogen narcosis – Narcotic effects of respiratory nitrogen
    - Equivalent narcotic depth – Method for comparing the narcotic effects of a mixed diving gas with air
  - Oxygen toxicity – Toxic effects of breathing oxygen at high partial pressures
    - Maximum operating depth – Safety concept in underwater diving
  - High-pressure nervous syndrome – Disorder from breathing helium based gas at high ambient pressure
  - Hydrogen narcosis – Psychotropic state induced by breathing hydrogen at high partial pressures
  - Hydrogen sulfide – Poisonous and flammable gas
- Vertigo – Dizziness with sensation of moving or surrounding objects moving
  - Alternobaric vertigo – Dizziness resulting from unequal pressures in the middle ears

== Diving safety ==
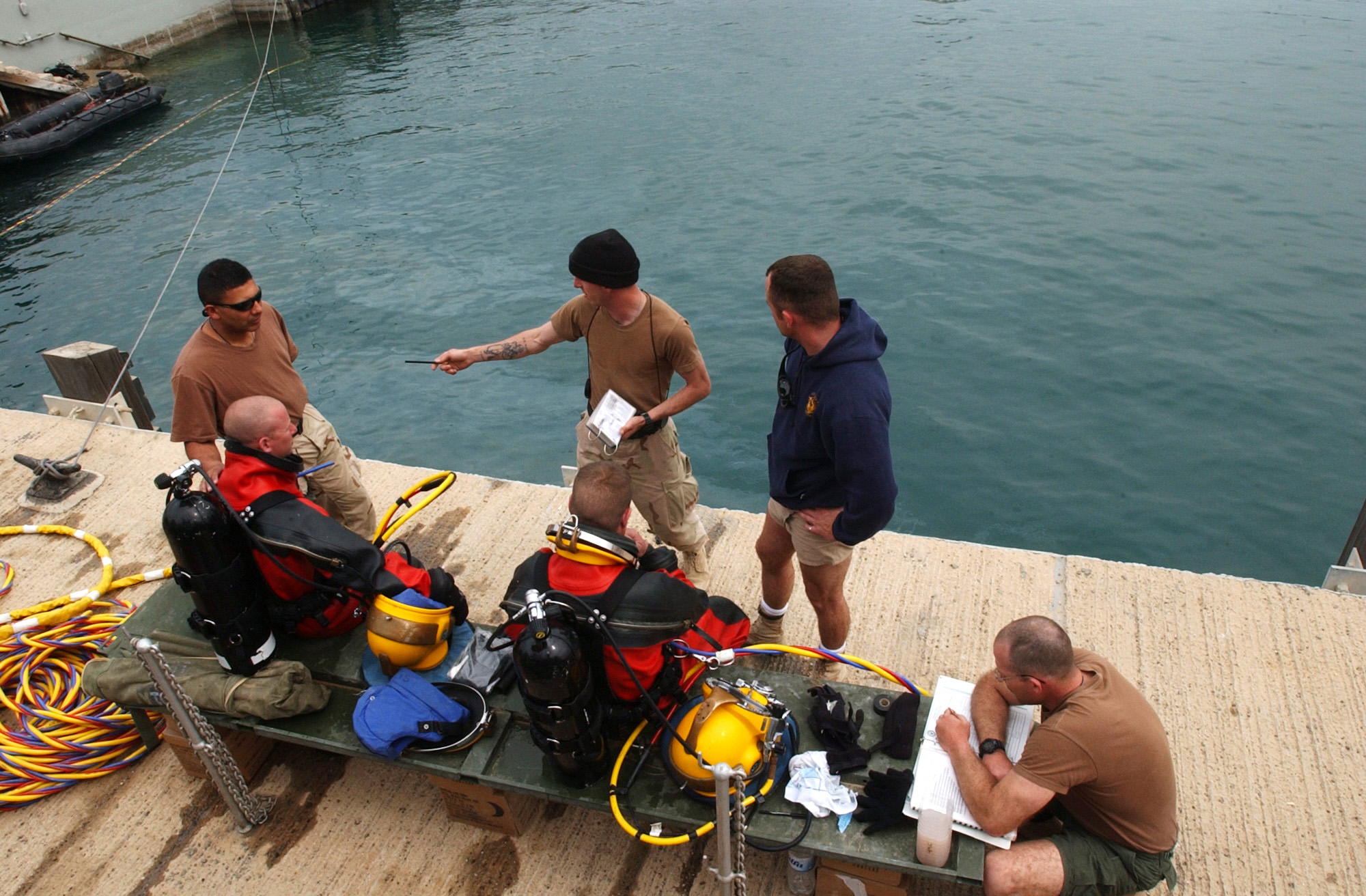
A dive team listens to a safety brief from their dive supervisor

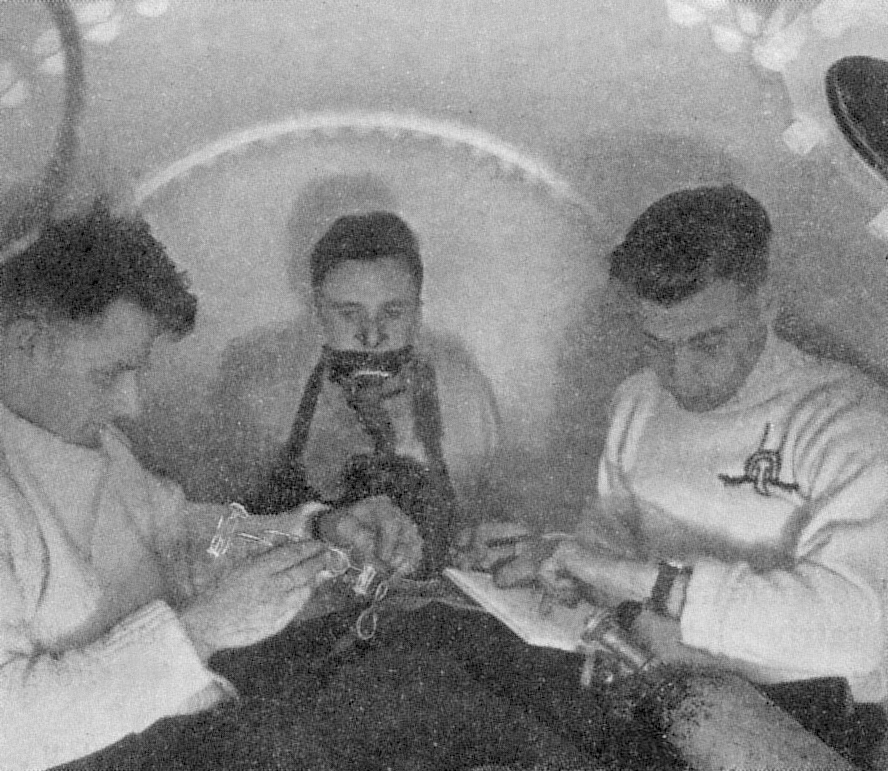
Early testing for oxygen toxicity in divers

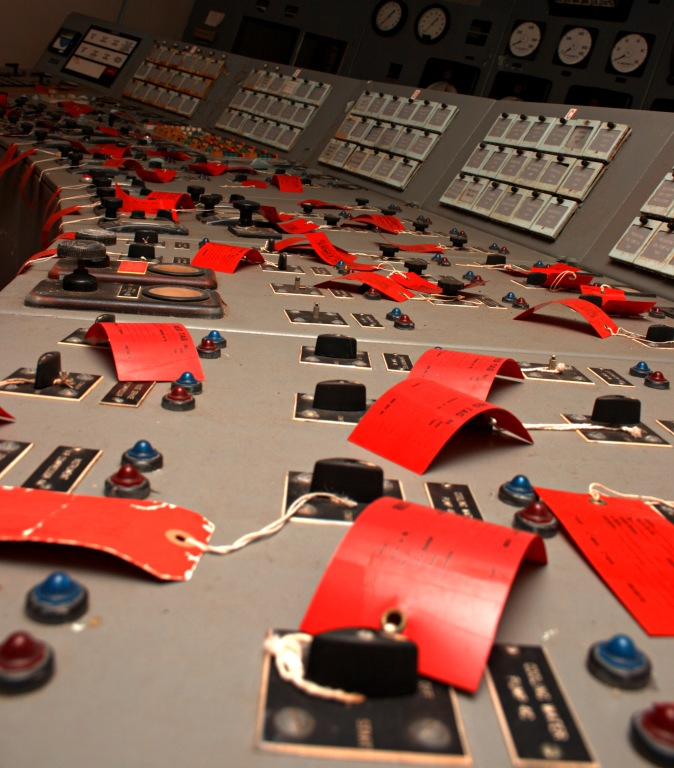
Tags in place in a powerplant after it was shut down

Folding lockout hasp, allowing six padlocks to lock out one device.

Checklists reduce the risk of omitting a step in a procedure

Diving safety – Risk management of underwater diving activities

- Checklist – Aide-memoire to ensure consistency and completeness in carrying out a task
- Code of practice (CoP) – Set of rules regarding behavior of people working in a particular occupation
- Dive team – A group of people working together to enhance dive safety and achieve a task
  - Professional diving – Underwater diving where divers are paid for their work
  - Diving supervisor – Professional diving team leader responsible for safety
  - Stand-by diver – A member of a dive team who is ready to assist or rescue the working diver
  - Bellman (diving) – The member of a dive team who acts as stand-by diver and tender from the diving bell
  - Diver's attendant – Assistant for a diver
  - Life support technician – A member of a saturation diving team who operates the surface habitat
  - Chamber operator – A person who operates a diving chamber
  - Diving systems technician – A competent person who maintains and repairs diving life-support equipment
- Divemaster – Recreational dive leader certification and role
- Diving hazards – Agents and situations that pose a threat to the underwater diver
  - Silt out – Reduction of underwater visibility by disturbing silt deposits
  - Task loading – Relationship between operator capacity and the accumulated activities that must be done
- Diver rescue – Rescue of a distressed or incapacitated diver
  - Rescue Diver – Recreational scuba certification emphasising emergency response and diver rescue
- Doing It Right (scuba diving) (DIR) – Technical diving safety philosophy
- Hazardous Materials Identification System – Numerical hazard rating using colour coded labels
- Human factors in diving equipment design – Influence of the interaction between the user and the equipment on design
- Human factors in diving safety
- Occupational safety and health, also known as Occupational health and safety – Field concerned with the safety, health and welfare of people at work
  - Safety culture – Risk-averse attitudes
- Operations manual – Authoritative document of how things should be done in an organisation
  - Emergency response plan – Action to be taken in specific emergencies
  - Evacuation plan – Plan for removal of personnel from a high risk area or a developing incident to a safer place
  - Standard operating procedure (SOP) – Set of detailed instructions to assist in workplace safety
- Risk management – Identification, evaluation and control of risks
  - Hazard analysis (HAZID) – Method for assessing risk
  - Hazard identification – First step of risk assessment and management
  - Job safety analysis (JSA) – Procedure to integrate safety practices into a particular task
  - Risk assessment – Estimation of risk associated with exposure to a given set of hazards
  - Risk control – Process in which identified risks are reduced or mitigated
    - Hierarchy of hazard controls – System used in industry to eliminate or minimize exposure to hazards
  - Incident pit – Conceptual model for explaining incident development and recovery
  - Lockout–tagout (LOTO) – Safe isolation of dangerous equipment during maintenance or testing
  - Permit-to-work – Work safety management system
  - Redundancy – Duplication of critical components to increase reliability of a system
  - Safety data sheet, also known as Material safety data sheet – Sheet listing work-related hazards of a product or substance
- Scuba diving fatalities – Deaths occurring while scuba diving or as a consequence of scuba diving
- Single point of failure – Component whose failure will disrupt the entire system
- Water safety – Human safety in the vicinity of bodies of water

=== Diving incidents, rescues, and fatalities ===
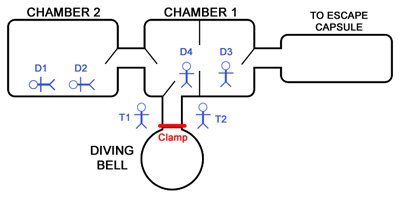
The decompression chamber at the moment the Byford Dolphin accident occurred. D1–D4 are divers; T1 and T2 are dive tenders.

Incidents and people involved in a notable incident while diving or during a diving operation.

- Early diving incidents
  - John Day (carpenter) – First recorded death in a diving chamber
  - Charles Spalding – Scottish confectioner and amateur diving bell designer
  - Ebenezer Watson – nephew of Charles Spalding and died in the same accident
- Freediving incidents
  - Loïc Leferme – French freediving record breaker
  - Audrey Mestre – French world record-setting freediver
  - Nicholas Mevoli – American freediver who died while attempting to set a record (1981–2013)
  - Natalia Molchanova – Russian multiple world record holding freediver (1962–2015)
- Professional diving incidents
  - Johnson Sea Link accident – Manned submersible incident in Florida
  - Offshore diving incidents
    - Byford Dolphin#Diving bell accident – Semi-submersible offshore drilling rig
    - Drill Master diving accident – Fatal diving bell accident off Norway in 1974
    - Star Canopus diving accident – Fatal offshore diving bell accident in 1978
    - Venture One diving accident – Saturation diving fatality in the North Sea in 1977
    - Waage Drill II diving accident – Fatal saturation diving accident in the North Sea in 1975
    - Wildrake diving accident – Fatal offshore diving accident in Scotland, 1979
  - Rescues involving diving
    - Tham Luang cave rescue – 2018 international rescue mission in Thailand
    - Harrison Odjegba Okene – Nigerian ship's cook, rescued after 60 hours in a sunken tugboat
  - Professional diving fatalities
    - Roger Baldwin (diver) represented by Waage Drill II diving accident – Fatal saturation diving accident in the North Sea in 1975
    - John Bennett (diver) – British technical diver and former record holder lost in commercial diving incident
    - Victor F. Guiel Jr. represented by Wildrake diving accident – Fatal offshore diving accident in Scotland, 1979
    - Craig M. Hoffman represented by Venture One diving accident – Saturation diving fatality in the North Sea in 1977
    - Peter Henry Michael Holmes represented by Waage Drill II diving accident – Fatal saturation diving accident in the North Sea in 1975
    - Edwin Clayton Link represented by Johnson Sea Link accident – Manned submersible incident in Florida
    - Gerard Anthony Prangley represented by Star Canopus diving accident – Fatal offshore diving bell accident in 1978
    - Per Skipnes represented by Drill Master diving accident – Fatal diving bell accident off Norway in 1974
    - Robert John Smyth represented by Drill Master diving accident – Fatal diving bell accident off Norway in 1974
    - Albert D. Stover represented by Johnson Sea Link accident – Manned submersible incident in Florida
    - Richard A. Walker represented by Wildrake diving accident – Fatal offshore diving accident in Scotland, 1979
    - Lothar Michael Ward represented by Star Canopus diving accident – Fatal offshore diving bell accident in 1978
    - Joachim Wendler – German aquanaut (1939–1975)
    - Death of Bradley Westell – Fatal diving accident in the North Sea in 1995
    - Arne Zetterström – Swedish diver and researcher (1917–1945)
- Scuba diving fatalities – Deaths occurring while scuba diving or as a consequence of scuba diving
  - Ricardo Armbruster – Spanish ecologist, adventurer and entrepreneur
  - Allan Bridge – American conceptual artist (1945–1995)
  - David Bright (diver) – Wreck diver
  - Berry L. Cannon – American aquanaut who died in a diving incident (1935–1969)
  - Cotton Coulson – Photographer known for his work for National Geographic magazine
  - E. Yale Dawson – American botanist and taxonomist
  - Deon Dreyer – South African diver (1974–1994)
  - Milan Dufek – Czech folk country band
  - Sheck Exley – American cave and deep diving pioneer and record breaker
  - Maurice Fargues – French navy diver and first scuba fatality using aqualung for a depth record attempt
  - Guy Garman – Scuba diver who died in a world record attempt
  - Steve Irwin – Australian conservationist (1962–2006)
  - Henry Way Kendall – American particle physicist who won the Nobel Prize in Physics
  - Artur Kozłowski (speleologist) – Polish cave diver (1977–2011)
  - Chris and Chrissy Rouse, represented by The Last Dive – Non-fiction book by Bernie Chowdhury about a double wreck diving fatality
  - Kirsty MacColl – British singer and songwriter (1959–2000)
  - Agnes Milowka – Australian cave diver
  - François de Roubaix – French film score composer
  - Dave Shaw – Australian technical diver (1954–2005)
  - Wesley C. Skiles – American cave diver and cinematographer
  - Dewey Smith – American aquanaut (1972–2009)
  - Rob Stewart (filmmaker) – Canadian photographer, filmmaker and shark conservationist
  - Esbjörn Svensson – Swedish jazz pianist (1964–2008)
  - Josef Velek – Czech journalist, author, and environmentalist (1939–1990)

=== Legal aspects of diving ===
Legal aspects of diving – How underwater diving and divers are affected by law

- Civil liability in recreational diving – Legal duty of care, negligence and liability in recreational diving
- Diving regulations – Stipulations of the delegated legislation regarding the practice of underwater diving – Legislation regulating diving activity, usually a branch of occupational health and safety.
- Duty of care – Type of legal obligation
- Investigation of diving accidents – Forensic investigation of underwater diving accidents
- List of legislation regulating underwater diving

== Geography of diving ==
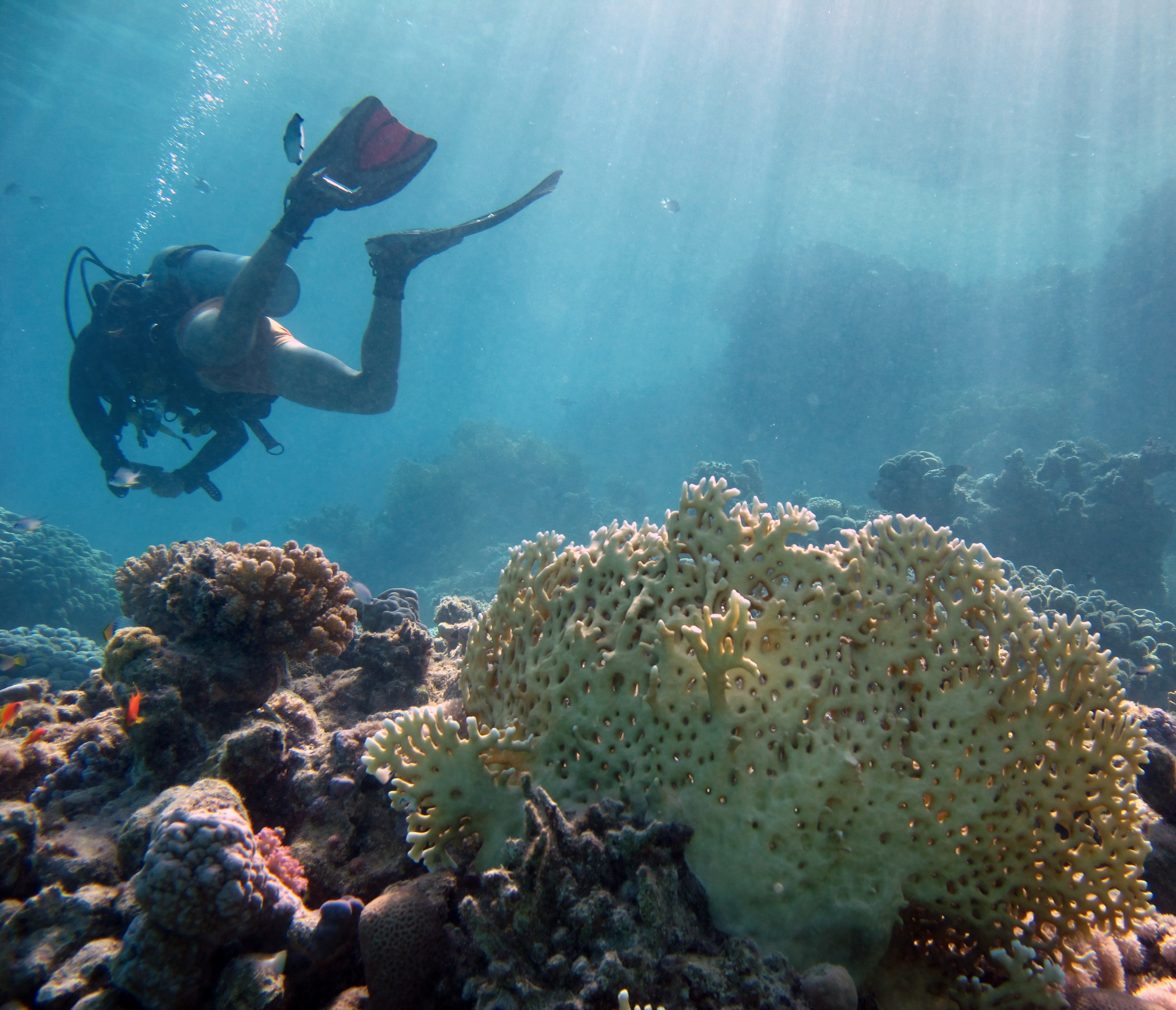
Recreational diver over a coral reef in the Red Sea

Recreational dive sites are specific places that recreational scuba divers go to enjoy the underwater environment or for training purposes. They include technical diving sites beyond the range generally accepted for recreational diving. In this context all diving done for recreational purposes is included. Professional diving tends to be done where the job is, and with the exception of diver training and leading groups of recreational divers, does not generally occur at specific sites chosen for their easy access, pleasant conditions or interesting features.

Recreational dive sites may be found in a wide range of bodies of water, and may be popular for various reasons, including accessibility, biodiversity, spectacular topography, historical or cultural interest and artifacts (such as shipwrecks), and water clarity. Tropical waters of high biodiversity and colourful sea life are popular recreational diving tourism destinations. South-east Asia, the Caribbean islands, the Red Sea and the Great Barrier Reef of Australia are regions where the clear, warm, waters, reasonably predictable conditions and colourful and diverse sea life have made recreational diving an economically important tourist industry.

Recreational divers may accept a relatively high level of risk to dive at a site perceived to be of special interest. Wreck diving and cave diving have their adherents, and enthusiasts will endure considerable hardship, risk and expense to visit caves and wrecks where few have been before. Some sites are popular almost exclusively for their convenience for training and practice of skills, such as flooded quarries. They are generally found where more interesting and pleasant diving is not locally available, or may only be accessible when weather or water conditions permit.

While divers may choose to get into the water at any arbitrary place that seems like a good idea at the time, a popular recreational dive site will usually be named, and a geographical position identified and recorded, describing the site with enough accuracy to recognise it, and hopefully, find it again. (Full article...)

== History of underwater diving ==
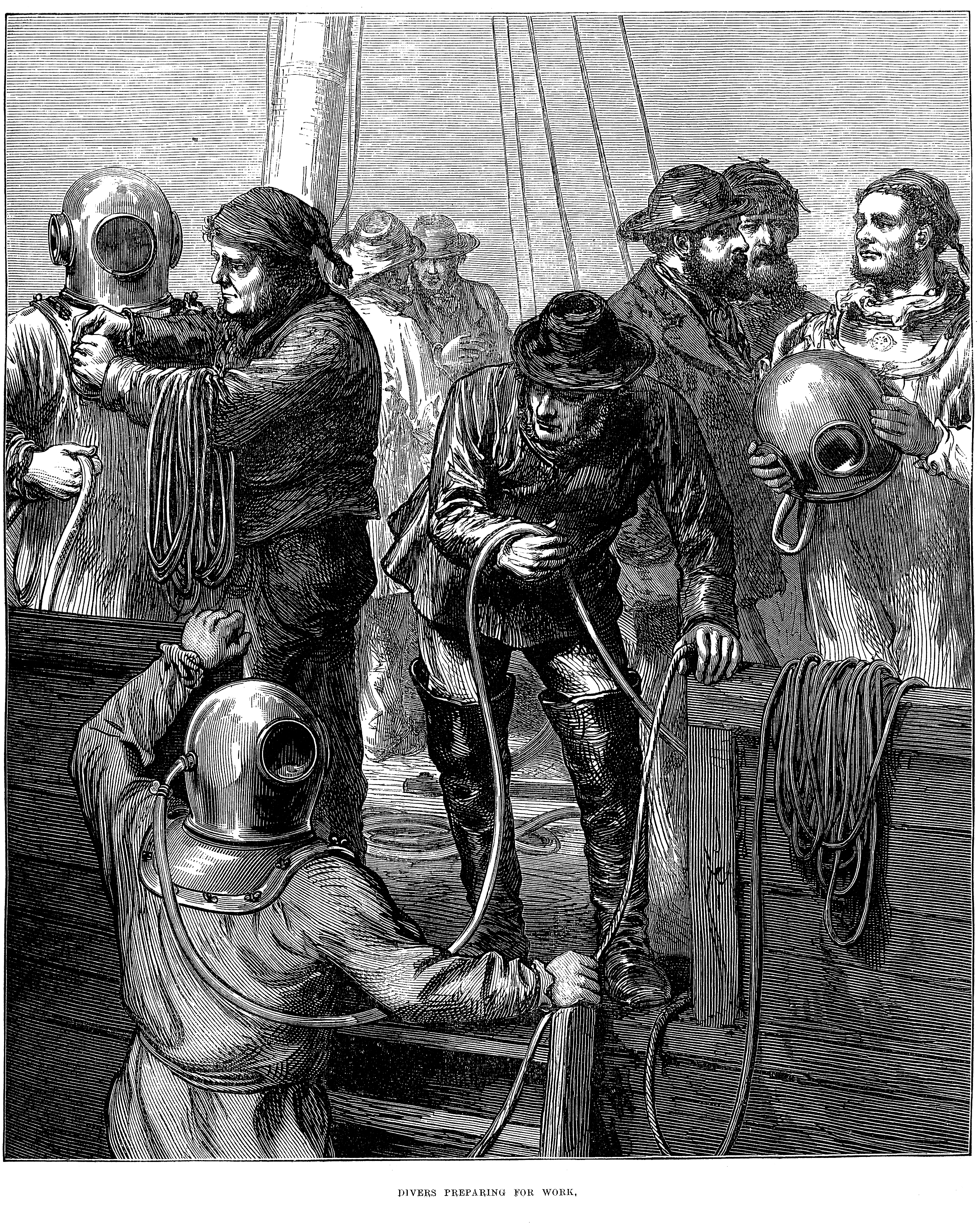
Siebe's improved design in 1873.

History of underwater diving – Developments over time in the human activity

- History of decompression research and development
- History of scuba diving – Origins and development of diving using breathing gas carried by the diver
  - Vintage scuba – Early model scuba equipment and the ongoing activity of diving with it
- List of researchers in underwater diving
- Lyons Maritime Museum – Diving history museum in St. Augustine, Florida
- Timeline of diving technology – Chronological list of notable events in the history of underwater diving equipment

=== Military and covert operations ===
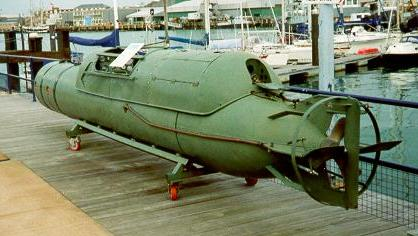
Italian Maiale manned torpedo "Siluro San Bartolomeo" displayed at the Royal Navy Submarine Museum, Gosport, UK.

- 1982 invasion of the Falkland Islands – Argentine invasion of the Falklands
- Exercise Paddington Diamond – Joint Bolivian-British-Swiss scuba diving expedition to Lake Titicaca
- Raid on Algiers – Italian frogman raid on Allied ships in Algiers harbour in 1942
- Defense against swimmer incursions – Methods of protection from incursions by divers and swimmers
- Italian auxiliary ship Olterra – Undercover Italian auxiliary ship from World War II
- Operation Algeciras – Argentine plan to sabotage a British warship in Gibraltar
- Operation Thunderhead – American amphibious mission during the Vietnam War
- Raid on Alexandria (1941) – Italian frogman raid on British warships
- Sinking of the Rainbow Warrior – 1985 covert attack by French foreign intelligence service on a Greenpeace ship
- USS Westchester County (LST-1167) – US Navy tank landing ship built in 1952

=== Underwater salvage operations ===
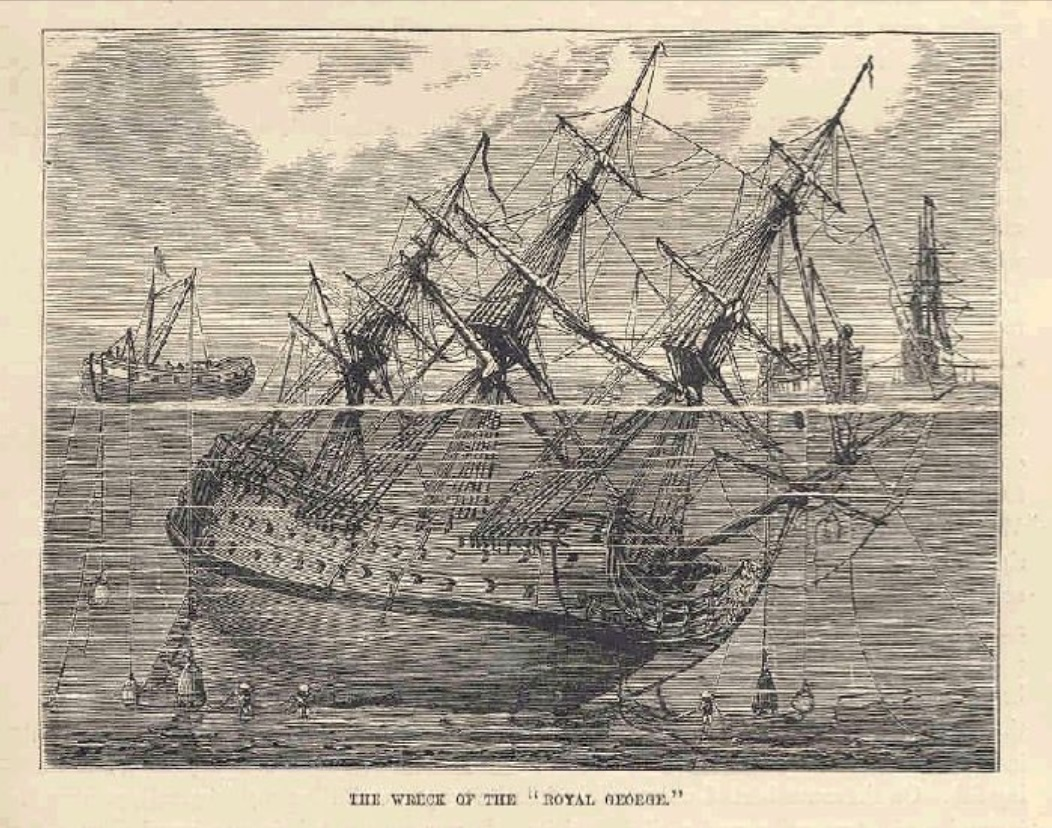
Salvage of Royal George

- Salvage operations on HMS Royal George – Early salvage operations using bells and surface supplied divers
- Salvage of the SS Egypt's gold – Recovery of bullion from wreck using an atmospheric pressure observation bell
- Kursk submarine disaster#Salvage operation – Raising the wreck of a Russian nuclear submarine
- USS Squalus represented by USS Sailfish (SS-192)#Sinking of Squalus and recommissioning as Sailfish – The successful rescue of the crew and later raising of the sunken vessel.

== Training, certification, registration and standards ==
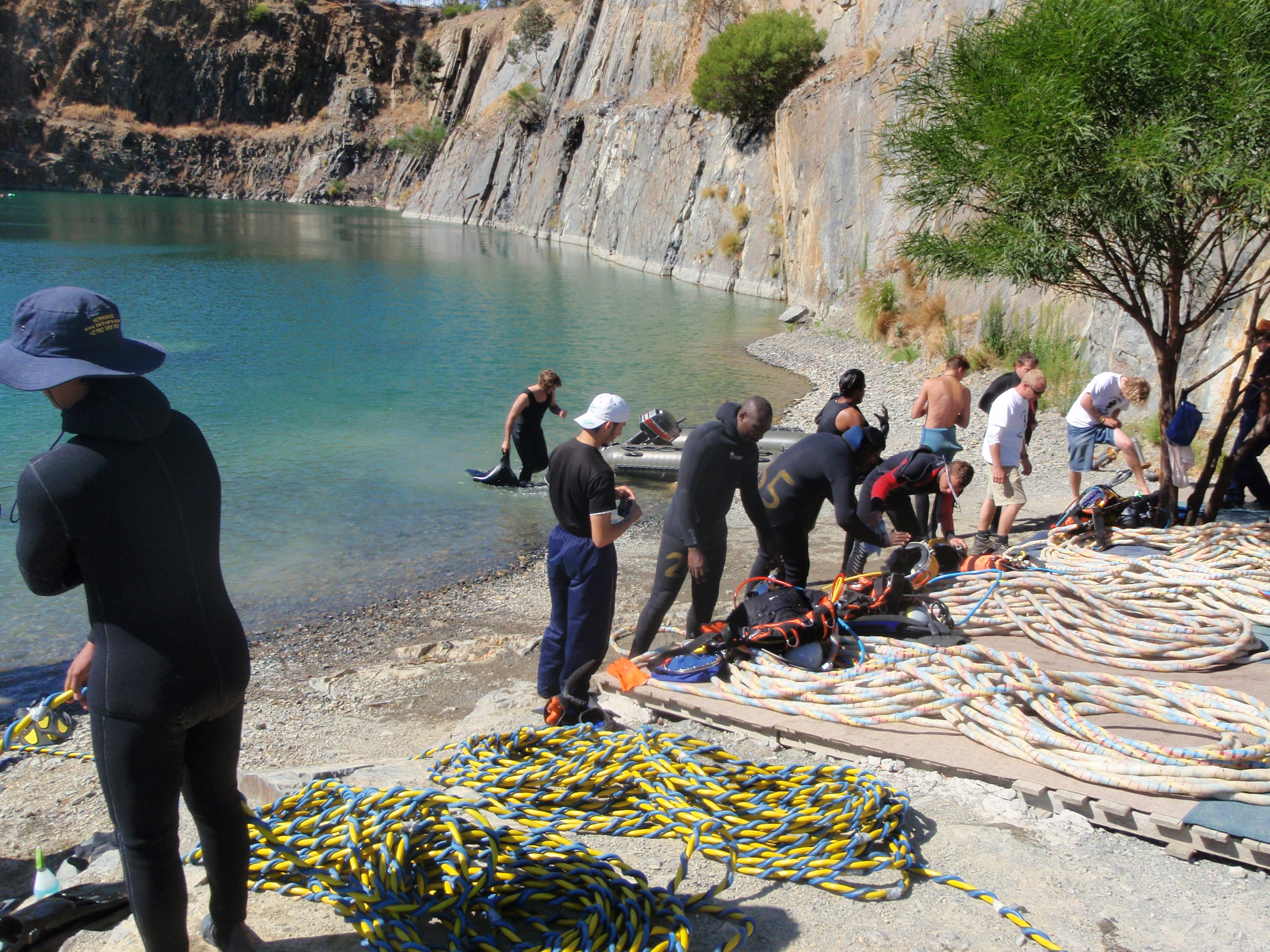
Commercial diver training at Blue Rock Quarry

=== Diver training ===
- Diver training – Processes to develop the skills and knowledge to dive safely underwater
- Diver certification – Certification as competent to dive to a specified standard

Diver training can be distinguished between recreational and occupational diver training. Recreational diver training tends to be split into small skill sets for customer convenience and provider profitability. Recreational diver training systems include training and registration of instructors and dive leaders for recreational diving

- Recreational diver training – Training process for people who do not dive at work
  - Adaptive Support Diver – Scuba diver trained to support divers with disabilities
  - Advanced nitrox diver – Technical diving qualification to use multiple mixtures of oxygen enriched air
  - Advanced Open Water Diver – Recreational scuba diving certification slightly above minimum entry level
  - Advanced trimix diver – Recreational technical diving certification to use hypoxic trimix
  - Altitude diver – Diver competent to plan decompression at altitude
  - Autonomous diver – International minimum standard for entry level recreational scuba diver certification
  - BSAC First Class Diver – Recreational diver competent to lead a group of divers carrying out a project
  - Cave diver – Diving in water-filled caves
  - Cavern diver – Certification for diving under a natural overhead within the zone of natural light
  - CMAS* scuba diver, also known as One Star Diver – Entry level recreational diving certification from CMAS
  - CMAS** scuba diver, also known as Two Star Diver – Autonomous recreational scuba diving certification
  - CMAS*** scuba diver, also known as Three Star Diver – Fully trained and experienced recreational diver
  - CMAS**** scuba diver, also known as Four Star Diver – A three-star diver with a high level of competence and broad experience
  - Dive leader, also known as Divemaster – Recreational diving certification and role
  - Recreational diving instructor – Person who trains and assesses recreational divers
  - Dry suit diver – Certification for diving in a dry suit
  - Hypoxic trimix diver – Recreational technical diving certification level
  - Low impact diver – Diver with the skills to avoid contact with the benthos
  - Open Water Diver – Entry-level autonomous diver certification for recreational scuba diving
  - Master Instructor – Grade of recreational dive instructor with some experience
  - Master Scuba Diver – Scuba diver certification
  - Night diver – Certification of competence to scuba dive at night
  - Nitrox diver – Recreational diving qualification to dive using oxygen enriched air
  - Normoxic trimix diver – Recreational technical diving certification level
  - PADI Delayed Surface Marker Buoy Diver – Diver trained to deploy a decompression buoy from depth
  - PADI Peak Performance Buoyancy – PADI diver with buoyancy control skill
  - Rebreather diver – Scuba diving qualification to use a rebreather
    - Seni-closed rebreather diver
    - Closed circuit rebreather diver
  - Recreational trimix diver – Certification to dive with normoxic trimix with equivalent narcotic depth 80 ft or less
  - Rescue Diver – Recreational scuba certification emphasising emergency response and diver rescue
  - Search and recovery diver – Diver certified as trained in underwater search and recovery
  - Scuba refresher course – Coaching to restore skills and knowledge
  - Sidemount diver – Scuba certification for using scuba sets clipped to the sides of the harness
  - Solo diver – Recreational diver diving without a dive buddy
  - Supervised diver – Class of recreational scuba diver
  - Introductory diving – Non-certification scuba diving experience
  - Underwater navigator – Diver competent to navigate in open water by compass or pilotage
  - Underwater photographer, also known as Underwater digital photographer – Person who takes photographs underwater
  - Underwater videographer – Diver trained in the use of video recorders underwater
  - Wreck diver – Recreational diving certification as competent to dive on wrecks
- Universal Referral Program – System to complete recreational scuba training with another instructor
- World Recreational Scuba Training Council – Scuba diving standards body

Professional diver training is usually for registration based on mode of diving and requires a wider range of competence for a range of equipment skills and environments. Titles of certificates vary, but the basic competences are similar and may be internationally recognised by agreement.

- Occupational diver training – Training of people employed as underwater divers
- International Diving Regulators and Certifiers Forum (IDRCF) – International forum of professional diver accreditation organisations
  - Professional scuba diver, also known as Commercial scuba diver – Person with skills and knowledge required for occupational scuba diving
  - Surface-supplied air diver, also known as Inshore air diver – Person competent to dive with surface-supplied breathing apparatus
  - Extended range surface-supplied air diver, also known as Offshore air diver – Surface-supplied offshore air diving to 50 msw using a wet bell and hot water suit
  - Surface-supplied mixed gas diver, also known as Closed bell diver – Person competent to dive with mixed gas from a closed bell
  - Saturation diver – Diver registered as competent for saturation diving

Scientific diving is occupational diving in the pursuit of scientific knowledge, and there may be different conditions that apply regionally regarding regulation and registration.

- European Scientific Diving Panel – A panel of the European Network of Marine Research Institutes and Stations
  - Advanced European Scientific Diver – A diver competent to organise a scientific diving team
  - European Scientific Diver – Qualification for scientific divers

=== Diver certification organisations ===
List of diver certification organizations – Agencies which issue certification for competence in diving skills

- Occupational diver certification authorities
  - Australian Diver Accreditation Scheme (ADAS) – Australian based international occupational diver accreditation organisation
  - Divers Institute of Technology – Private, commercial educational institution for the training of commercial divers
  - Emergency Response Diving International (ERDI) – American organisation for training and certification of emergency response divers
  - Health and Safety Executive (HSE) – Health and safety body in Great Britain
  - South African Department of Employment and Labour – Department of the South African government responsible for matters related to employment
- Recreational diver certification agencies
  - Freediver certification agencies
    - AIDA International (AIDA) – Worldwide rule- and record-keeping body for competitive breath-hold events
    - Confédération Mondiale des Activités Subaquatiques (CMAS) – International organisation for underwater activities
    - Performance Freediving International (PI) – Freediver training agency
    - Scuba Schools International (SSI) – Recreational scuba and freediving training and certification agency
  - Recreational scuba certification agencies
    - American Nitrox Divers International (ANDI) – Recreational diver training and certification agency
    - CEDIP members
      - Association nationale des moniteurs de plongée (ANMP) – French recreational diver training and certification agency
    - British Sub-Aqua Club (BSAC) – UK governing body of recreational diving
      - Comhairle Fo-Thuinn (CFT) – Governing body for recreational diving and underwater hockey in Ireland
    - Confédération Mondiale des Activités Subaquatiques (CMAS) – International organisation for underwater activities
      - CMAS Europe – Non-profit branch of the world underwater federation representing European affiliates – the branch of the world underwater federation representing European affiliates
      - Fédération Française d'Études et de Sports Sous-Marins (FFESSM) – French diver training and certification agency
      - Federazione Italiana Attività Subacquee (FIAS) – Italian non-profit recreational diver training organisation affiliated to CMAS
      - Federación Española de Actividades Subacuáticas (FEDAS) – Spanish national federation for underwater activities, affiliated to CMAS
      - Israeli Diving Federation (TIDF) – Israeli nonprofit scuba diving association
      - Nederlandse Onderwatersport Bond (NOB) – Dutch governing body for underwater sports
      - Sub-Aqua Association (SAA) – British recreational diver training and certification organisation
      - Scuba Educators International (SEI) – Recreational diver training and certification agency
      - Türkiye Sualtı Sporları Federasyonu (TSSF) – Turkish national governing body for underwater sport and lifesaving
    - European Underwater Federation certification
      - Israeli Diving Federation (TIDF) – Israeli nonprofit scuba diving association
      - National Academy of Scuba Educators (NASE) – Recreational scuba training and certification agency
      - Scuba Schools International (SSI) – Recreational scuba and freediving training and certification agency
    - Global Underwater Explorers (GUE) – Recreational/technical scuba training and certification agency
    - International Association for Handicapped Divers (IAHD) – Non-profit organisation based in the Netherlands
    - International Association of Nitrox and Technical Divers (IANTD) – Recreational and technical scuba training and certification agency
    - National Association for Cave Diving (NACD) – American non-profit organization for improving cave diving safety
    - Scottish Sub Aqua Club (ScotSAC)
    - United Diving Instructors (UDI) – Recreational diver training and certification agency
    - Unified Team Diving (UTD) – a recreational diver training and certification agency
    - WRSTC and RSTC members
      - American Canadian Underwater Certifications (ACUC) – Recreational diver training and certification agency
      - International Diving Educators Association (IDEA) – Recreational scuba training and certification agency
      - National Association of Underwater Instructors (NAUI) – Non-profit training and certification agency association of scuba instructors
      - Professional Association of Diving Instructors (PADI) – Recreational diver training and certification agency
      - Professional Diving Instructors Corporation (PDIC) – Recreational diver training and certification agency
      - Professional Technical and Recreational Diving – Diver certification agency
      - Rebreather Association of International Divers (RAID) – Recreational diver training and certification agency
      - Scuba Diving International (SDI) – Recreational diver training and certification agency
      - Scuba Schools International (SSI) – Recreational scuba and freediving training and certification agency
    - YMCA SCUBA Program – Defunct recreational diver training and certification agency
  - Technical diver certification agencies
    - Cave diving certification agencies
      - Cave Divers Association of Australia (CDAA) – Australian cave diving organisation
      - Cave Diving Group (CDG) – UK based cave diver training and certification agency
      - National Association for Cave Diving (NACD) – American non-profit organization for improving cave diving safety
    - American Nitrox Divers International (ANDI) – Recreational diver training and certification agency
    - British Sub-Aqua Club (BSAC) – UK governing body of recreational diving
    - Diving Science and Technology (DSAT) – PADI affiliate and developer of recreational decompression planning tools
    - Federazione Italiana Attività Subacquee (FIAS) – Italian non-profit recreational diver training organisation affiliated to CMAS
    - Global Underwater Explorers (GUE) – Recreational/technical scuba training and certification agency
    - International Association of Nitrox and Technical Divers (IANTD) – Recreational and technical scuba training and certification agency
    - National Association of Underwater Instructors (NAUI) – Non-profit training and certification agency association of scuba instructors
    - Professional Association of Diving Instructors (PADI) – Recreational diver training and certification agency
    - Professional Diving Instructors Corporation (PDIC) – Recreational diver training and certification agency
    - Professional Technical and Recreational Diving – Diver certification agency
      - Rebreather Association of International Divers (RAID) – Recreational diver training and certification agency
    - Technical Diving International (TDI) – Technical diver training and certification agency
    - Trimix Scuba Association (TSA) – Recreational technical scuba training and certification agency
    - Technical Extended Range (TXR) – Recreational scuba and freediving training and certification agency
    - Unified Team Diving (UTD) – A recreational and technical diver training and certification agency
- Scientific diver certification authorities
  - American Academy of Underwater Sciences (AAUS) – American diving standards organisation
  - CMAS Scientific Committee – International organisation for underwater activities
  - South African Department of Employment and Labour – Department of the South African government responsible for matters related to employment

=== Organisations setting international standards and codes of practice for diving and diver training ===
- Association of Diving Contractors International (ADCI) – Non-profit organization for promoting standards and knowledge for commercial diving
- European Underwater Federation (EUF) – Umbrella organisation representing scuba diver training organisations in Europe
- International Diving Regulators and Certifiers Forum (IDRCF) – International forum of professional diver accreditation organisations
- International Diving Schools Association (IDSA) – Organisation to develop common standards for commercial diver training
- International Marine Contractors Association (IMCA) – International trade association for the marine contracting industry
- International Organization for Standardization (ISO) – International standards development organization
- Rebreather Training Council (RTC) – Organisation to coordinate rebreather training standards
- World Recreational Scuba Training Council (WRSTC) – Scuba diving standards body
- Scientific diving standards organizations
  - American Academy of Underwater Sciences (AAUS) – American diving standards organisation
  - European Scientific Diving Panel – A panel of the European Network of Marine Research Institutes and Stations

=== Commercial diving schools ===
- Divers Academy International – Technical educational institution in New Jersey

== Underwater diving organisations ==
=== Diver membership organisations ===
Diver membership organisations

- Freediver federations
  - AIDA International (AIDA) – Worldwide rule- and record-keeping body for competitive breath-hold events
  - AIDA Hellas – National representative of AIDA International in Greece
  - British Freediving Association (BFA) – British affiliate to AIDA International
  - Confédération Mondiale des Activités Subaquatiques (CMAS) – International organisation for underwater activities
- Recreational and technical scuba clubs and associations
  - British Sub-Aqua Club (BSAC) – UK governing body of recreational diving
  - Cave Divers Association of Australia (CDAA) – Australian cave diving organisation
  - Cave Diving Group (CDG) – UK based cave diver training and certification agency
  - International Association for Handicapped Divers (IAHD) – Non-profit organisation based in the Netherlands
  - National Association for Cave Diving (NACD) – American non-profit organization for improving cave diving safety
  - Woodville Karst Plain Project (WKPP) – Project and organization to map the underwater cave systems of the Woodville Karst Plain
  - Military services recreational diving organisations
    - Naval Air Command Sub Aqua Club – British organization within the Royal Navy
- Scientific, archaeological and historical diving organisations
  - Historical Diving Society
  - Nautical Archaeology Society (NAS) – British organisation to further research in nautical archaeology for the public benefit
  - Save Ontario Shipwrecks (SOS) – Provincial heritage NGO in Ontario, Canada
  - Sea Research Society – American nonprofit for marine research
- National underwater-sports federations
  - Australian Underwater Federation (AUF) – Governing body for underwater sports
  - British Octopush Association (BOA) – National body for underwater hockey in the United Kingdom
  - British Underwater Sports Association (BUSA) – National sporting association
  - Comhairle Fo-Thuinn (CFT) – Governing body for recreational diving and underwater hockey in Ireland
  - Federación Española de Actividades Subacuáticas (FEDAS) – Spanish national federation for underwater activities, affiliated to CMAS
  - Fédération Française d'Études et de Sports Sous-Marins (FFESSM) – French diver training and certification agency
  - South African Underwater Sports Federation (SAUSF) – Sports governing body in South Africa
  - Türkiye Sualtı Sporları Federasyonu (TSSF) – Turkish national governing body for underwater sport and lifesaving
  - Underwater Society of America (USOA) – American national representative organization for underwater sport
- International underwater-sports federations
  - AIDA International (AIDA) – Worldwide rule- and record-keeping body for competitive breath-hold events
  - Confédération Mondiale des Activités Subaquatiques (CMAS) – International organisation for underwater activities

=== Diver nature conservation organisations ===
- Artificial Reef Society of British Columbia (ARSBC) – Canadian non-profit to create artificial reefs for habitat enhancement and recreation
- Green Fins – Coral reef conservation charity
- National Speleological Society – Cave Diving Section (NSS-CDS) – Organization for exploration, conservation, and study of caves in the United States

=== Diving industry trade associations ===
- Diving Equipment and Marketing Association (DEMA) – International trade association for the recreational diving equipment industry

=== Underwater environmental research organisations ===
- National Oceanic and Atmospheric Administration (NOAA) – US government scientific agency
- Reef Life Survey (RLS) – Marine life monitoring programme based in Hobart, Tasmania
- South African Environmental Observation Network (SAEON) – Long-term ecological research network

=== Diving medical research organisations ===
- Aerospace Medical Association – Professional organization in aviation, space, hyperbaric and environmental medicine
- Divers Alert Network (DAN) – Group for improving diving safety
- Diving Diseases Research Centre (DDRC) – British hyperbaric medical organization
- Diving Medical Advisory Council (DMAC) – Independent organisation of diving medical specialists from Northern Europe
- European Diving Technology Committee (EDTC) – International organisation for improving professional diver safety
- European Underwater and Baromedical Society (EUBS) – Source of information for diving and hyperbaric medicine
- National Board of Diving and Hyperbaric Medical Technology – Non-profit organization for education and certification in diving and hyperbaric medicine
- Naval Submarine Medical Research Laboratory – U.S. Navy research unit for submarine and diving medicine
- Royal Australian Navy School of Underwater Medicine – Unit based in Sydney, Australia
- Rubicon Foundation – American non-profit foundation
- South Pacific Underwater Medicine Society (SPUMS) – Publisher for diving and hyperbaric medicine and physiology
- Southern African Underwater and Hyperbaric Medical Association (SAUHMA)
- Undersea and Hyperbaric Medical Society (UHMS) – US based hyperbaric research organization
- United States Navy Experimental Diving Unit (NEDU) – US military research and development unit

== Underwater diving publications ==
=== Books and manuals ===
- The Darkness Beckons – History of UK cave diving by Martyn Farr
- Goldfinder – Autobiography of British diver and treasure hunter Keith Jessop
- The Last Dive – Non-fiction book by Bernie Chowdhury about a double wreck diving fatality
- Shadow Divers – Book by Robert Kurson recounting the discovery of a World War II German U-boat wreck
- The Silent World: A Story of Undersea Discovery and Adventure – Book by Jacques-Yves Cousteau and Frédéric Dumas
- Basic Cave Diving: A Blueprint for Survival – Book on cave diving safety by Sheck Exley
- Exploration and Mixed Gas Diving Encyclopedia – Tom Mount, Joseph Dituri, Eds
- Deep diving: an advanced guide to physiology, procedures and systems
- Diving manual A document providing extensive general information on the equipment, procedures and theoretical basis of underwater diving.
  - NOAA Diving Manual – Training and operations manual for scientific diving Scientific diving manual published by the National Oceanographic and Atmospheric Administration
  - Professional Diver's Handbook – British Underwater diving expert John Bevan Ed. A manual of offshore diving
  - U.S. Navy Diving Manual – Training and operations handbook
- Diving Medicine for Scuba Divers – Carl Edmonds, Bart McKenzie, Robert Thomas
- Bennett and Elliott's physiology and medicine of diving – English medical researcher (1931–2022) Alf O. Brubakk, Tom S. Neuman, Eds
- The Underwater Handbook: A Guide to Physiology and Performance for the Engineer – Charles Shilling, Ed.

=== Legislation ===
- List of legislation regulating underwater diving
- Diving regulations – Stipulations of the delegated legislation regarding the practice of underwater diving
- Diving at Work Regulations 1997 – UK legislation regulating all aspects of professional diving

=== Codes of practice ===
(National or international codes of practice for diving)

- Code of practice – Set of rules regarding behavior of people working in a particular occupation
- IMCA Code of Practice for Offshore Diving – Guidance document for member organisations A voluntary code of industry best practice followed by members of the International Marine Contractors Association.
- Code of Practice for Scientific Diving: Principles for the Safe Practice of Scientific Diving in Different Environments – Document published by UNESCO

=== Standards ===
(National or international standards relating to diving equipment or practices)

Buoyancy compensators

- EN 1809:1998 Diving accessories. Buoyancy compensators. Functional and safety requirements, test methods.
- EN 1809:2014+A1:2016 Diving equipment. Buoyancy compensators. Functional and safety requirements, test methods.

Depth gauges

- EN 13319:2000 Diving accessories. Depth gauges and combined depth and time measuring devices. Functional and safety requirements, test methods.

Diver training

- ISO 24801 – International training standards for recreational scuba Recreational diving services – Requirements for the training of recreational scuba divers
- ISO 21417 Recreational diving services – Requirements for training on environmental awareness for recreational divers

Diving masks

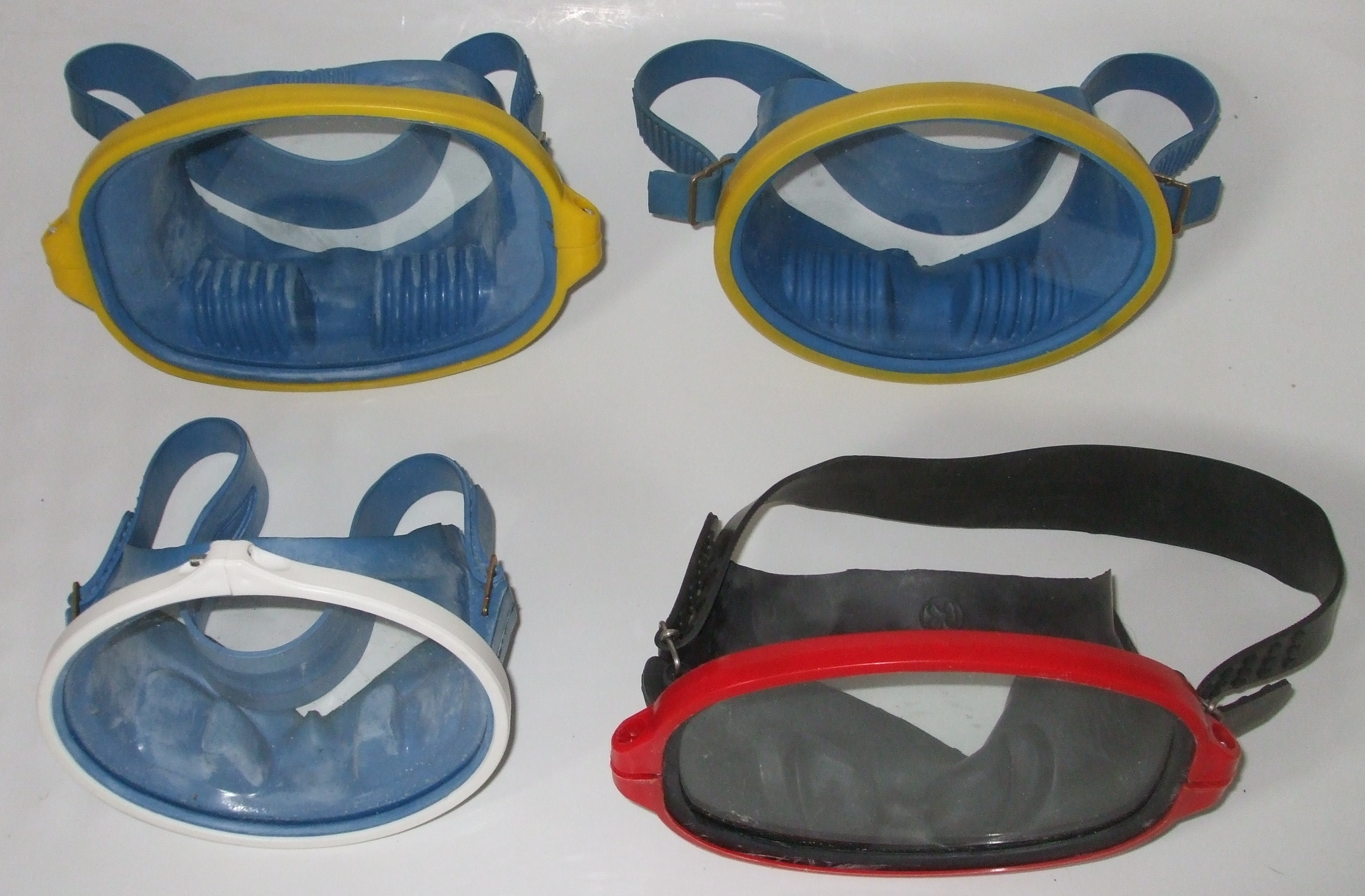
GOST 20568:1975 compliant Russian and Ukrainian diving masks

- ANSI Z87.11:1985 Underwater Safety. Recreational Skin and Scuba Diving. Lenses for Masks.
- BN-82/8444-17.01 Gumowy sprzęt pływacki - Maski pływackie (Rubber swimming equipment - Swimming masks).
- BS 4532:1969 Specification for snorkels and face masks. Amended 1977.
- CNS 12497:1989 潛水鏡. Diving mask.
- CNS 12498:1989 潛水鏡檢驗法. Method of test for diving mask.
- DIN 7877:1980 Tauch-Zubehör. Tauchbrillen. Sicherheitstechnische Anforderungen und Prüfung. Diving accessories for skin divers. Diver's masks. Requirements and testing.
- EN 16805:2015 Diving equipment. Diving mask. Requirements and test methods.
- GOST 20568:1975 Маски резиновые для плавания под водой. Общие технические условие. Rubber masks for submarine swimming. General specifications.
- ÖNORM S 4225 Tauch-Zubehör; Tauchmasken (Tauchbrillen); Sicherheitstechnische Anforderungen, Prüfung, Normkennzeichnung. Diving accessories; divers’ masks; safety requirements, testing, marking of conformity.

Dry suits

- EN 14225-2:2002 Diving suits. Dry suits. Requirements and test methods.
- EN 14225-2:2017 Diving suits. Dry suits. Requirements and test methods.

Recreational diving services

- ISO 21416 Recreational diving services – Requirements and guidance on environmentally sustainable practices in recreational diving

Snorkels

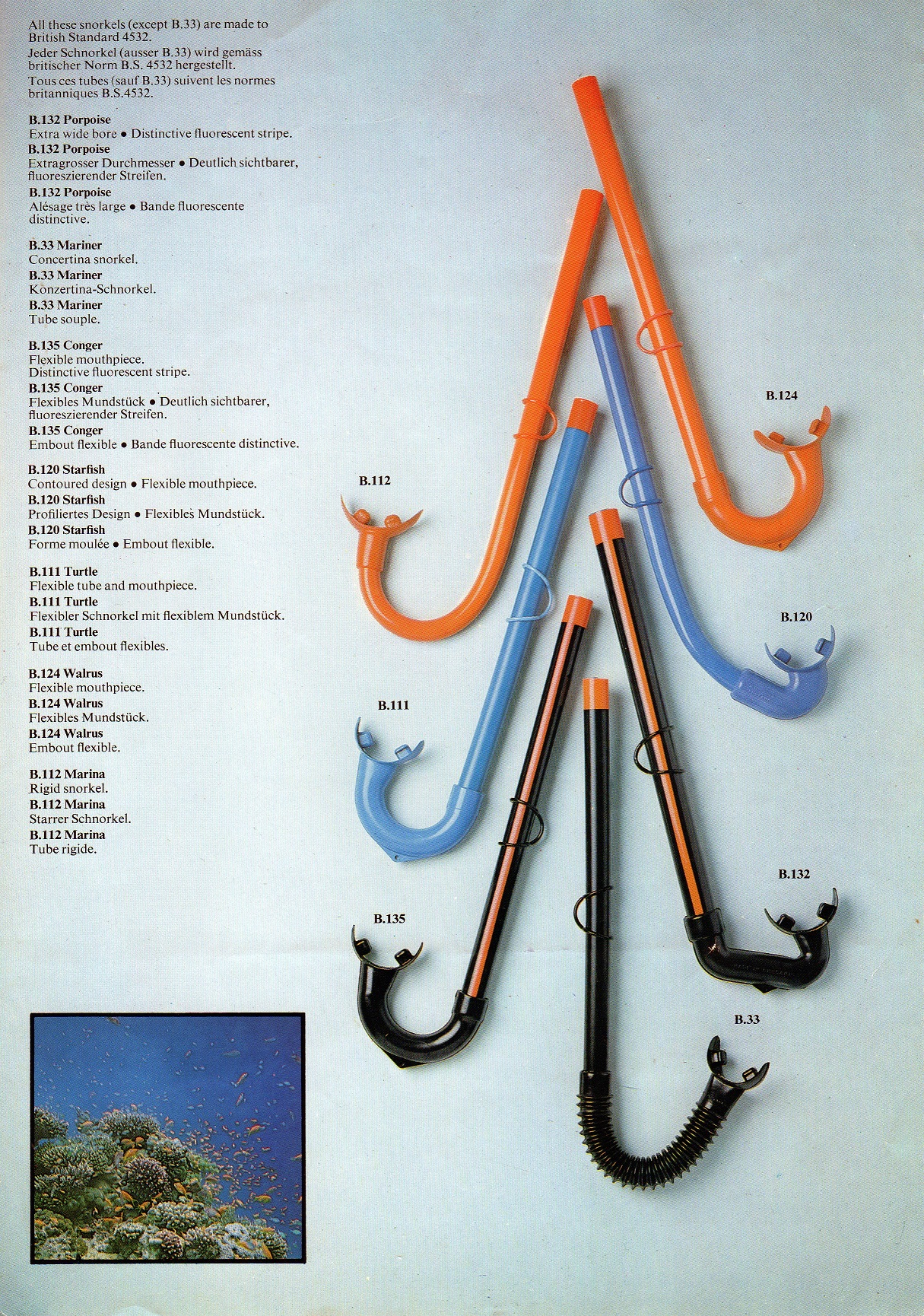
A range of 1970s snorkels made to British Standard BS 4532:1969

- BS 4532:1969 Specification for snorkels and face masks. Amended 1977.
- DIN 7878:1980 Tauch-Zubehör; Schnorchel; Maße, Anforderungen, Prüfung. Diving accessories for skin divers. Snorkel. Technical requirements of safety, testing.
- DIN 7878:1991 Tauch-Zubehör; Schnorchel; Sicherheitstechnische Anforderungen und Prüfung. Diving accessories for skin divers. Snorkel. Safety requirements and testing.
- EN 1972:1997 – European standard for design and manufacture of snorkels Diving accessories. Snorkels. Safety requirements.
- EN 1972:2015 Diving equipment. Snorkels. Requirements and test methods.
- ÖNORM S 4223:1988 Tauch-Zubehör; Schnorchel; Abmessungen, sicherheitstechnische Anforderungen, Prüfung, Normkennzeichnung. Diving accessories; snorkels; dimensions, safety requirements, testing, marking of conformity.

Swimfins

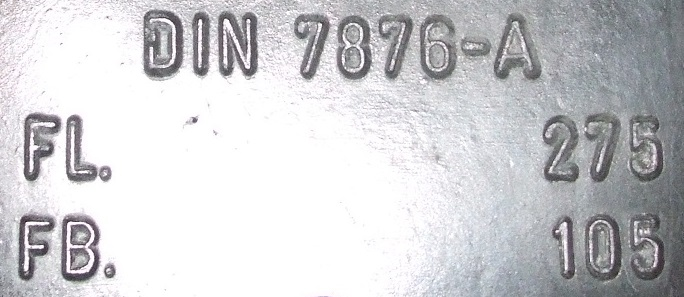
Swim fin sole showing compliance with German standard DIN 7876:1980

- BN-82/8444-17.02 Gumowy sprzęt pływacki - Płetwy pływackie (Rubber swimming equipment - Swimming fins).
- DIN 7876:1980 Tauchzubehör. Schwimmflossen. Maße, Anforderungen und Prüfung. Diving accessories for skin divers. Flippers. Dimensions, requirements and testing.
- EN 16804:2015 Diving equipment. Diving open heel fins. Requirements and test methods.
- GOST 22469:1977 Ласты резиновые для плавания. Общие технические условия. Swimming rubber flippers. General specifications.
- MIL-S-82258:1965 Military specification. Swim fins, rubber.
- MS 974:1985 Specification for rubber swimming fins.
- MS 974:2002 Specification for rubber swimming fins. First revision.
- ÖNORM S 4224:1988 Tauch-Zubehör; Schwimmflossen; Abmessungen, sicherheitstechnische Anforderungen, Prüfung, Normkennzeichnung. Diving accessories; fins; dimensions, safety requirements, testing, marking of conformity.

Underwater breathing apparatus

- BS EN 1802:2002 Transportable gas cylinders. Periodic inspection and testing of seamless aluminium alloy gas cylinders
- BS EN 1968:2002 Transportable gas cylinders. Periodic inspection and testing of seamless steel gas cylinders
- EN 14143-2003 Respiratory equipment - Self-contained re-breathing diving apparatus

Wetsuits

- CNS 11251:1985 濕式潛水衣. Diving Wet Suit.
- EN 14225-1:2005 Diving suits. Wet suits. Requirements and test methods.
- EN 14225-1:2017 Diving suits. Wet suits. Requirements and test methods.

=== Journals and magazines ===
- AquaCorps Magazine on technical diving, founded and edited by Michael Menduno
- Alert Diver – Quarterly magazine published by DAN Quarterly magazine of DAN on diving safety and recreational diving matters
- South Pacific Underwater Medical Society Journal – Journal covering underwater and hyperbaric medicine and physiology
- Undersea and Hyperbaric Medicine – Journal covering underwater and hyperbaric medicine and physiology

=== Repositories ===
- Rubicon Research Repository – Defunct database of environmental physiology documents

=== Recreational dive site guides ===
Notable dive site guides with Wikipedia article.

- Index of recreational dive sites – Alphabetical listing of articles on porular places for recreational diving

=== Authors of publications about diving ===
Bob Halstead

Authors of general non-fiction works on diving topics who are the subjects of Wikipedia articles.

- Michael C. Barnette – American underwater diver, writer and founder of the Association of Underwater Explorers
- Victor Berge – Swedish diving pioneer and author
- Philippe Diolé – French author and undersea explorer
- Gary Gentile – American author and pioneering technical diver
- Bob Halstead – British scuba diver (1944–2018)
- Jarrod Jablonski – Pioneer American cave diver, author and previous cave diving record holder
- Trevor Jackson (diver) – Australian technical diver and author (born 1965)
- Richie Kohler – American technical diver and shipwreck historian
- Steve Lewis (diver) – Technical scuba diver and author
- John Mattera – American wreck diver and author
- Tom Mount – Pioneering technical and cave diver (1939–2022)

=== Documentaries ===
Documentary movies focused on underwater diving.

- Ama Girls – 1958 film
- Ben's Vortex – Documentary film on the disappearsnce of Ben McDaniel
- Dave Not Coming Back – 2020 film by Jonah Malak
- Diving into the Unknown – 2016 Finnish film directed by Juan Reina
- Dolphin Man – 2017 French film directed by Lefteris Charitos
- Encounters at the End of the World – 2007 documentary film by Werner Herzog
- Last Breath (2019 film) – 2019 British documentary film
- The Rescue (2021 film) – 2021 documentary film by Elizabeth Chai Vasarhelyi and Jimmy Chin
- Sharkwater – 2006 Canadian documentary film on overexploitation of sharks
- Sharkwater Extinction – 2018 Canadian documentary film directed by Rob Stewart
- The Silent World – 1956 documentary film by Jacques Cousteau and Louis Malle
- The Trapped 13: How We Survived The Thai Cave – 2022 Thai documentary film
- Voyage to the Edge of the World – 1976 French nature documentary
- Wonders of the Sea 3D – 2019 film directed by Jean-Michel Cousteau and Jean-Jacques Mantello
- World Without Sun – 1964 documentary film by Jacques Cousteau

== Underwater diving in popular culture ==
Movies, novels, TV series and shows, comics, graphic art, sculpture, games, myths, legends, and misconceptions. Fiction in general relating to all forms of diving, including hypothetical and imaginary methods, and other aspects of underwater diving which have become part of popular culture.

== Researchers in diving medicine and physiology ==
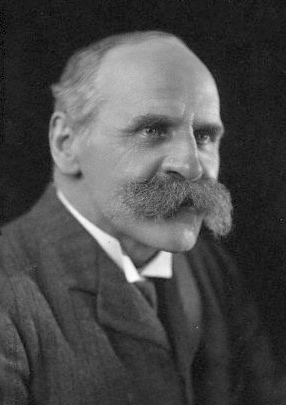
John Scott Haldane c. 1910

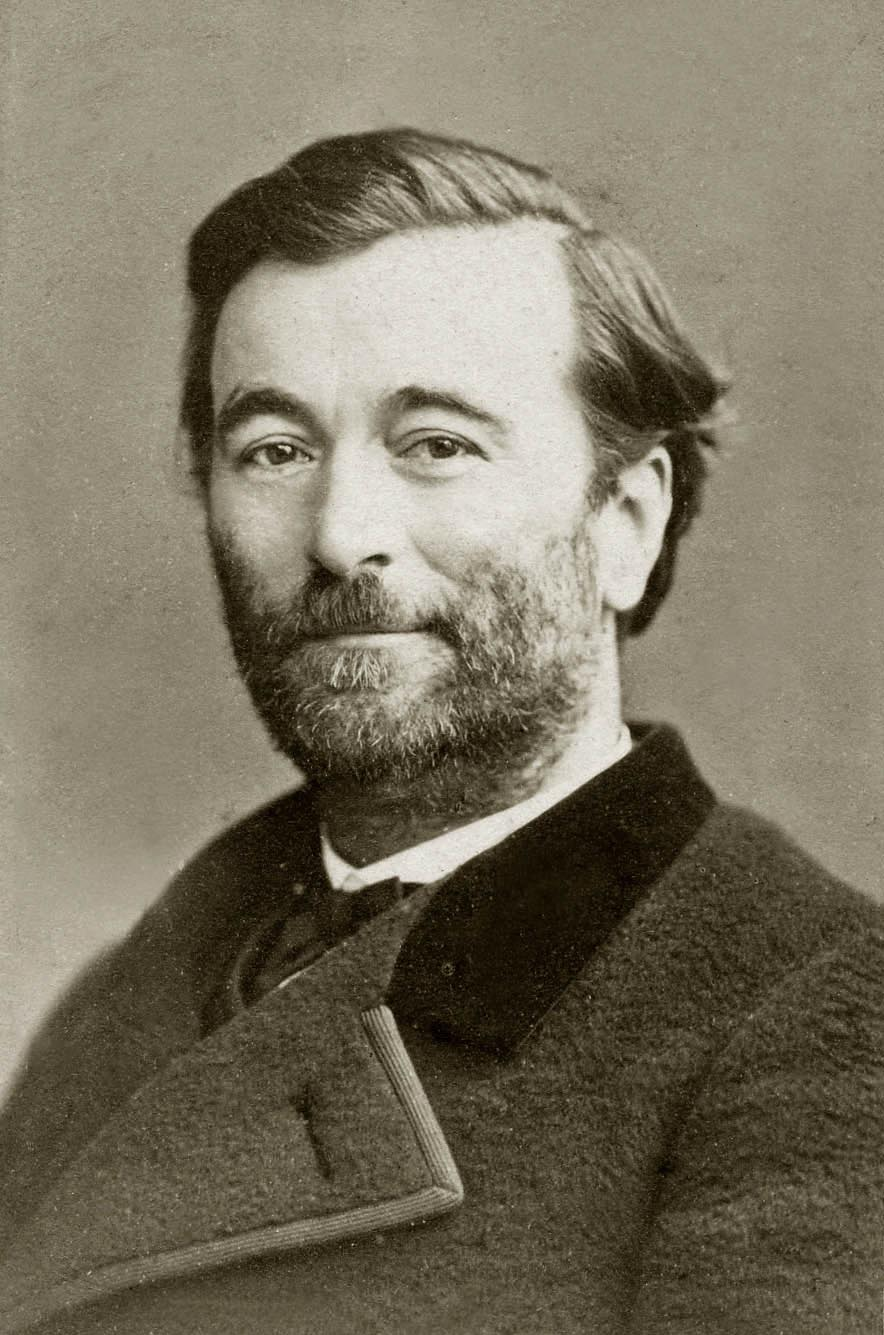
Paul Bert

- Arthur J. Bachrach – American psychologist and administrator (1923–2011)
- Albert R. Behnke – US Navy physician and diving medicine researcher
- Paul Bert – French zoologist, physiologist and politician (1833–1886)
- George F. Bond – US Navy physician and diving medicine and saturation diving researcher
- Robert Boyle – Anglo-Irish scientist (1627–1691)
- Alf O. Brubakk – Norwegian decompression researcher (1941–2022)
- Albert A. Bühlmann – Swiss physician and decompression researcher (1923–1994)
- John R. Clarke (scientist) – American scientist and underwater breathing apparatus authority
- William Paul Fife – US Air Force officer and hyperbaric medicine researcher
- John Scott Haldane – British physiologist and researcher (1860–1936)
- Robert William Hamilton Jr. – American physiologist
- Leonard Erskine Hill – British physiologist (1866–1952)
- Brian Andrew Hills – Physiologist who worked on decompression theory
- Felix Hoppe-Seyler – German physiologist and chemist (1825–1895)
- Christian J. Lambertsen – American medical researcher (1917–2011)
- Simon Mitchell – New Zealand physician and author on diving medicine
- Charles Momsen – US Navy admiral, submarine rescue (1896–1967)
- John Rawlins R.N. – Royal Navy officer and pioneer in the field of diving medicine
- Charles Wesley Shilling – U.S. Navy physician, researcher, and educator
- Edward D. Thalmann – American hyperbaric medicine specialist (1945-2004)
- Jacques Triger – French geologist who invented the pressurised caisson (1801–1867)

== Underwater divers ==
This is a list of underwater divers whose exploits have made them notable. Underwater divers are people who take part in underwater diving activities – Underwater diving is practiced as part of an occupation, or for recreation, where the practitioner submerges below the surface of the water or other liquid for a period which may range between seconds to order of a day at a time, either exposed to the ambient pressure or isolated by a pressure resistant suit, to interact with the underwater environment for pleasure, competitive sport, or as a means to reach a work site for profit or in the pursuit of knowledge, and may use no equipment at all, or a wide range of equipment which may include breathing apparatus, environmental protective clothing, aids to vision, communication, propulsion, maneuverability, buoyancy and safety equipment, and tools for the task at hand. (Full article...)

- Outline of underwater divers – Hierarchical outline list of biographical articles about underwater divers
- Index of underwater divers – Alphabetical listing of articles about underwater divers

=== Pioneers of diving ===
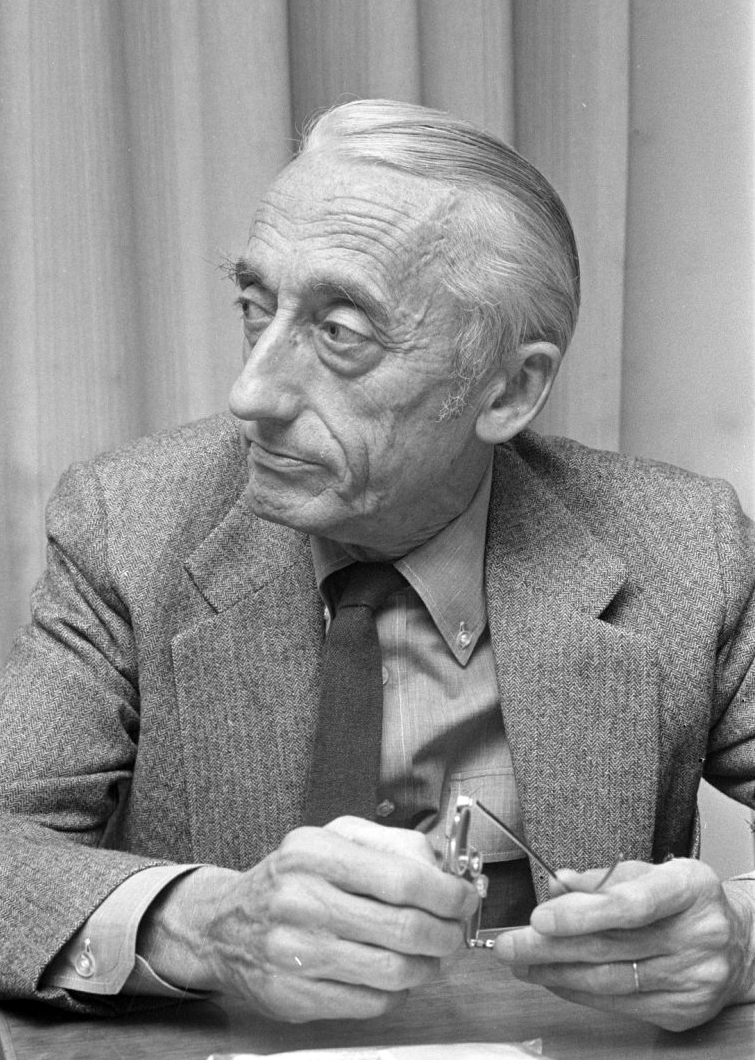
Jacques Cousteau

- James F. Cahill – American scuba diving pioneer
- Alphonse and Théodore Carmagnolle – French inventors of the first anthropomorphic armoured diving suit
- Charles Condert – Inventor of an unsuccessful early scuba system
- Jacques Cousteau – Inventor of scuba-diving apparatus and film-maker
- Charles Anthony Deane – Pioneering diving engineer and inventor of a surface supplied diving helmet
- John Deane – Joint inventor of the diving helmet
- Louis de Corlieu – French naval officer and inventor of the swimfin
- Guglielmo de Lorena – Italian inventor of a diving bell used for archaeological work on the Roman ships of lake Nemi
- Auguste Denayrouze – French inventor of a demand air supply regulator for underwater diving
- Frédéric Dumas – French pioneer of scuba diving
- Ted Eldred – Australian inventor of the single hose diving regulator
- Maurice Fernez – French inventor and pioneer in underwater breathing apparatus
- Émile Gagnan – French engineer and co-inventor of the open circuit demand scuba regulator
- Bret Gilliam – Pioneering technical diver and author.
- Edmond Halley – English astronomer, geophysicist, mathematician, meteorologist, and physicist
- Hans Hass – Austrian biologist, film-maker, and underwater diving pioneer
- Stig Insulán – Inventor of an adjustable automatic exhaust valve for variable volume dry suits
- Jim Jarret – Diver who test dived the first successful atmospheric diving suits
- Yves Le Prieur – French naval officer and inventor of a free-flow scuba system
- John Lethbridge – English wool merchant who invented a diving machine in 1715
- William Hogarth Main – Cave diver and scuba configuration experimentalist
- Phil Nuytten – Canadian deep-ocean explorer, scientist, and inventor of the Newtsuit
- Joseph Salim Peress – pioneering British diving engineer
- Benoît Rouquayrol – French inventor of an early diving demand regulator
- Dick Rutkowski – American pioneer in hyperbaric and diving medicine and use of mixed breathing gases for diving
- Joe Savoie – Inventor of the neck dam for lightweight helmets
- Augustus Siebe – German-born British engineer mostly known for his contributions to diving equipment
- Charles Spalding – Scottish confectioner and amateur diving bell designer
- Robert Sténuit – Belgian journalist, writer, underwater archeologist and the first aquanaut.
- Arne Zetterström – Diver involved in experimental work with Hydrox breathing gas

=== Underwater art and artists ===
Christ of the Abyss at San Fruttuoso, Liguria

- Jason deCaires Taylor – British sculptor and creator of the world's first underwater sculpture park
- Christ of the Abyss – Submerged statue of Jesus Christ

== Diving tourism ==
- Dive boat – Boat used for the support of scuba diving operations
  - Basic dive boat – Dive boat with minimal facilities
  - Day dive boat – Dive boat for longer trips without overnight accommodation
  - Liveaboard dive boat – Vessel providing support for diving tourists
- Dive guide (publication) – Travel guides for recreational diving
- Dive resort – Recreational diving service provider with accommodation
- Environmental impact of recreational diving – Effects of scuba diving on the underwater environment
- Introductory diving, also known as Resort diving, Try diving – Non-certification scuba diving experience
- Recreational diving – Diving for the purpose of leisure and enjoyment
- Recreational diving service provider – Tangible and intangible goods and services provision for recreational diving tourism
- Diver training referral system – System for allowing training to be completed by another instructor
- Refresher training – Training to update existing skills and knowledge
- Scuba diving tourism – Industry based on recreational diver travel
- Shark tourism – Tourism industry for viewing wild sharks
- Sinking ships for wreck diving sites – Scuttling old ships to produce artificial reefs

== Awards and events ==
- Hans Hass Award – Award in recognition of contribution made to the advancement of knowledge of the ocean
- International Scuba Diving Hall of Fame – Annual event recognizing recreational scuba industry contributors
- London Diving Chamber Dive Lectures – Series of public lectures
- NOGI Awards – Annual awards by Academy of Underwater Arts and Sciences
- Women Divers Hall of Fame – International honor society

== Terminology ==
- Glossary of underwater diving terminology
