= Diving support equipment =

Equipment used in the support of an underwater diving operation

Diving support equipment facilitates a diving operation. It is either not taken into the water during the dive, such as the gas panel and compressor, or is not integral to the actual diving, being there to make the dive easier or safer, such as a surface decompression chamber. Some equipment, like a diving stage, is not easily categorized as diving or support equipment and may be considered either.

Used as a section heading or equipment category in sources such as the NOAA Diving Standards & Safety Manual, the Canadian Standards Association occupational diving standards, and the U.S. Coast Guard Diving Program Manual (COMDTINST 3150.1E). In these contexts, the term serves to distinguish equipment that facilitates the dive, providing a practical classification for operational planning, safety management, and equipment maintenance.

== Breathing gas equipment ==
- Booster pump – Machine to increase pressure of a fluid
- Breathing gas – Gas used for human respiration
- Carbon dioxide scrubber – Device which absorbs carbon dioxide from circulated gas
- Cascade filling system – Filling pressurized gas from a series of storage cylinders
- Diver's pump – Manually powered surface air supply for divers
- Diving air compressor – Machine used to compress breathing air for use by underwater divers
- Diving air filter – Device to purify compressed breathing air
- Gas blending – Producing special gas mixtures to specification
- Gas blending for scuba diving – Mixing and filling cylinders with breathing gases for use when scuba diving
- Gas panel – Breathing gas distribution panel for surface-supplied diving
- Gas reclaim system – System to recover used breathing gas and prepare it for re-use
- Gas storage bank – Manifolded group of gas storage cylinders
- Gas storage quad – Group of similar size high pressure cylinders
- Gas storage tube – Large volume, high pressure gas storage cylinder
- Heliox – Breathing gas mixed from helium and oxygen
- Helium analyzer – Instrument to measure the concentration of helium in a gas mixture
- High pressure breathing air compressor – Machine to fill cylinders with atmospheric air at high pressure for breathing
- Low pressure breathing air compressor – Machine to provide atmospheric air at low pressure for breathing
- Membrane gas separation – Technology for splitting specific gases out of mixtures
- Nitrox – Breathing gas, mixture of nitrogen and oxygen
- Oxygen analyser – Instrument to measure partial pressure of oxygen in a gas mixture
- Oxygen compatibility – Usability in high-oxygen environments
- Pressure swing adsorption – Method of gases separation using selective adsorption under pressure
- Trimix – Breathing gas consisting of oxygen, helium and nitrogen

== Platforms ==
- Dive boat – Boat used for the support of scuba diving operations
  - Combat Rubber Raiding Craft – Rubberised fabric tactical inflatable boat used by the US Navy
  - Liveaboard – Way of using a boat
  - Subskimmer – Submersible diver propulsion vehicle with inflatable buoyancy for surface use
- Diving support vessel – Ship used as a floating base for professional diving projects
  - HMS Challenger (K07) – Royal Navy saturation diving support vessel
- Canoe and kayak diving – Recreational diving from a canoe or kayak

== Habitats ==
- Underwater habitat – Human habitable underwater enclosure filled with breathable gas
  - Aquarius Reef Base – Underwater habitat off Key Largo in the Florida Keys National Marine Sanctuary
  - Continental Shelf Station Two – Undersea research habitat in the Red Sea
  - Helgoland Habitat – Ambient pressure underwater habitat
  - Jules' Undersea Lodge
  - Scott Carpenter Space Analog Station – NASA underwater habitat
  - SEALAB – Experimental underwater habitats developed by the United States Navy
  - Tektite habitat – Undersea laboratory and experimental habitat

== Decompression equipment ==
- Built-in breathing system – System for supply of breathing gas on demand within a confined space
- Decompression buoy – Inflatable surface marker buoy deployed from underwater
- Decompression trapeze – Horizontal bars suspended at decompression stop depths
- Diving chamber – Hyperbaric pressure vessel for human occupancy used in diving operations
- Hyperbaric lifeboat – Lifeboat for transporting people under pressure
- Hyperbaric stretcher – Portable pressure vessel to transport a person under pressure
- Saturation system – Diving decompression system

== Deployment systems ==
- Atmospheric diving suit – Articulated pressure-resistant anthropomorphic housing for an underwater diver
- Bell cursor – Device to guide and control a diving bell near and above the surface
- Boarding stirrup – A suspended step to help divers lift themselves from the water into a boat – A suspended foot support allowing divers to use a leg to help lift themselves from the water into the boat.
- Clump weight – A heavy weight suspended on cable used to guide a diving bell
- Diver lift – Movable platform for lifting a diver from the water to deck level
- Diving bell – Chamber for transporting divers vertically through the water
- Diving ladder – Ladder to facilitate egress from the water by divers
- Launch and recovery system (LARS) – Equipment used to deploy and recover a diving bell, stage, or ROV
- Moon pool – Opening in the base of a hull, platform, or chamber giving access to the water below
- Shark-proof cage – A metal structure to protect divers and snorkellers from potentially dangerous sharks
- Shotline – Substantial weighted near-vertical line with buoy

== Remotely controlled underwater vehicles ==
- Remotely operated underwater vehicle – Tethered underwater mobile device operated by a remote crew
- 8A4-class ROUV – Chinese work class remotely operated underwater vehicle
- ABISMO – Japanese remotely operated underwater vehicle for deep sea exploration
- Atlantis ROV Team – High-school underwater robotics team from Whidbey Island, Washington, United States
- CURV – Early remotely operated underwater vehicle
- Épaulard – French remotely operated underwater vehicle of the Ifremer
- Global Explorer ROV – Deep water science and survey remotely operated vehicle
- Goldfish-class ROUV – Light class of Chinese remotely operated underwater vehicle
- Kaikō ROV – Japanese remotely operated underwater vehicle for deep sea exploration
- AN/BLQ-11 Long-Term Mine Reconnaissance System – American torpedo tube-launched underwater search and survey unmanned undersea vehicle
- Mini Rover ROV – Small, low cost observation class remotely operated underwater vehicle
- OpenROV – Open-source remotely operated underwater vehicle
- ROV KIEL 6000 – Remotely operated undersea vehicle
- ROV PHOCA – Remotely operated underwater vehicle of the COMANCHE type
- Scorpio ROV – Work class remotely operated underwater vehicle
- Sea Dragon-class ROV – Chinese deep diving work class remotely operated underwater vehicle
- Seabed tractor – Special purpose class of remotely operated underwater vehicle
- Seafox drone – Remotely operated anti-mine marine drone
- Seahorse ROUV
- SeaPerch – Remotely operated underwater vehicle educational program
- SJT-class ROUV – Series of Chinese remotely operated underwater vehicles
- T1200 Trenching Unit – Remotely operated seabed trenching unit
- VideoRay UROVs – Series of inspection class remotely operated underwater vehicles

== Dive planning and recording equipment ==
- Decompression tables – Tabulated data to facilitate safe diving ascents
- Dive planning – Process of planning an underwater diving operation
- Diver's logbook – Record of diving history of an underwater diver
- Diving operations record – Documentation recording a professional dive
- Recreational Dive Planner – Decompression table for divers
- Subsurface (software) – Open source software for logging and planning scuba dives

== Safety equipment ==
- Diver down flag – Flag signal indicating divers are in the water nearby
- Diving shot – Substantial weighted near-vertical line with buoy
- Jackstay – Substantial underwater guide line
- Reserve gas supply – Breathing gas supply for diving use if main supply is compromised or used uo

== Other ==
- Hot water system (diving) – Water heating and supply system for hot-water diving suits – Equipment to heat water and supply it to a surface-supplied diver through the umbilical system.
- Downline – Rope from the surface to an underwater workplace
