= Surface-supplied diving equipment =

Equipment used specifically for surface supplied diving

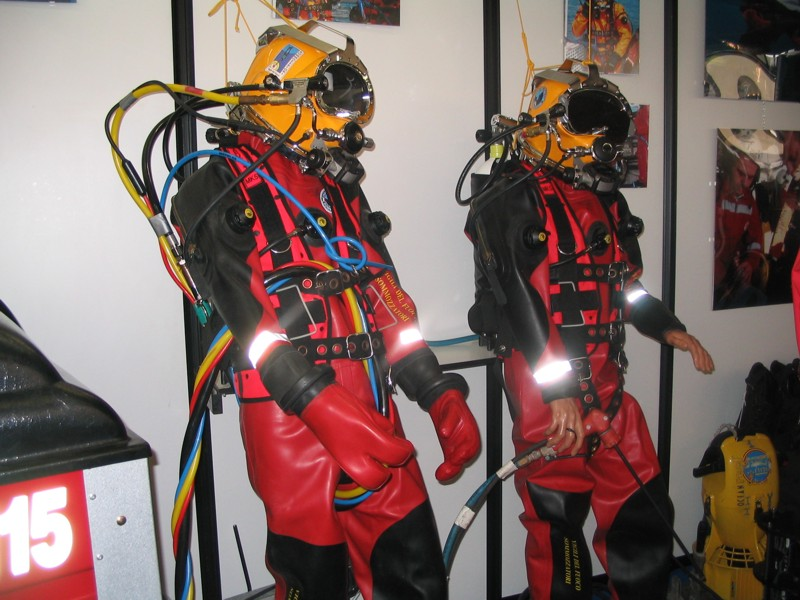
Surface-supplied commercial diving equipment on display at a trade show

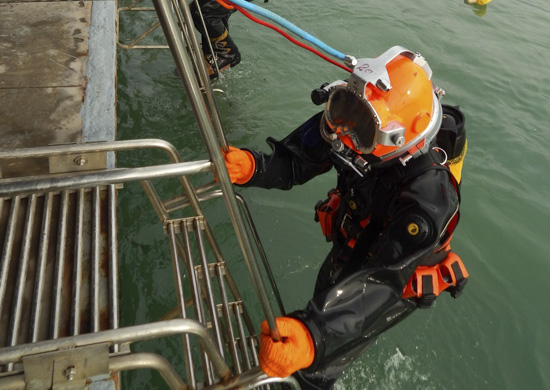
Diver of the Black Sea Fleet in diving equipment SVU-5

Surface-supplied diving equipment (SSDE) is the equipment required for surface-supplied diving. The essential aspect of surface-supplied diving is that breathing gas is supplied from the surface, either from a specialised diving compressor, high-pressure gas storage cylinders, or both. In commercial and military surface-supplied diving, a backup source of surface-supplied breathing gas should always be present in case the primary supply fails. The diver may also wear a bailout cylinder (emergency gas supply) which can provide self-contained breathing gas in an emergency. Thus, the surface-supplied diver is less likely to have an "out-of-air" emergency than a scuba diver using a single gas supply, as there are normally two alternative breathing gas sources available. Surface-supplied diving equipment usually includes communication capability with the surface, which improves the safety and efficiency of the working diver.

The equipment needed for surface supplied diving can be broadly grouped as diving and support equipment, but the distinction is not always clear. Diving support equipment is equipment used to facilitate a diving operation. It is either not taken into the water during the dive, such as the gas panel and compressor, or is not integral to the actual diving, being there to make the dive easier or safer, such as a surface decompression chamber. Some equipment, like a diving stage, is not easily categorised as diving or support equipment, and may be considered as either. Equipment required only to do the planned underwater work is not usually considered diving or support equipment.

Surface-supplied diving equipment is required for a large proportion of the commercial diving operations conducted in many countries, either by direct legislation, or by authorised codes of practice, as in the case of IMCA operations. Surface-supplied equipment is also required under the US Navy operational guidance for diving in harsh contaminated environments which was drawn up by the Navy Experimental Diving Unit.

== Breathing apparatus ==
The definitive equipment for surface-supplied diving is the breathing apparatus which is supplied with primary breathing gas from the surface via a hose, which is usually part of a diver's umbilical connecting the surface supply systems with the diver, sometimes directly, otherwise via a bell umbilical and bell panel.

=== Lightweight demand helmets ===
Lightweight demand helmets are rigid structures which fully enclose the head of the diver and supply breathing gas "on demand". The flow of gas from the supply line is activated by inhalation reducing the pressure in the helmet to slightly below ambient, and a diaphragm in the demand valve senses this pressure difference and moves a lever to open the valve to allow breathing gas to flow into the helmet. This flow continues until the pressure inside the helmet again balances the ambient pressure and the lever returns to the shut position. This is exactly the same principle as used for scuba demand valves, and in some cases the same internal components are used. Sensitivity of the lever can often be adjusted by the diver by turning a knob on the side of the demand valve. Lightweight demand helmets are available in open circuit systems (used when breathing standard air) and closed circuit (reclaim) systems (which may be used in order to reduce costs when breathing mixed gas such as heliox and trimix: the exhaled gas is returned to the surface, scrubbed of carbon dioxide, re-oxygenated, recompressed into storade cylinders and may be returned to the diver or used for a later dive).

The helmet may be of metal or reinforced plastic composite (GRP), and is either connected to a neck dam or clamped directly to a dry suit. The neck dam is the lower part of the helmet, which seals against the neck of the diver in the same way that the neck seal of a dry suit works. Neck dams may have neoprene or latex seals, depending on diver preference. Attachment to the neck dam is critical to diver safety and a reliable locking mechanism is needed to ensure that it is not inadvertently released during a dive. When using a dry suit, the neck dam may be permanently omitted and the lower part of the helmet assembly attached directly to the suit.

The term "Lightweight" is relative; the helmets are only light in comparison with the old copper hats. They are supported only by the head and neck of the diver, and are uncomfortably heavy (Weight of KM 77 = 32.43 pounds) out of the water, as they must be ballasted for neutral buoyancy during the dive, so they don't tend to lift the diver's head with excess buoyancy. There is little difference in weight between the metal shell and GRP shell helmets because of this ballasting, and the weight is directly proportional to the total volume - smaller helmets are lighter. To avoid fatigue, divers avoid donning the helmet until just prior to entering the water. Having the helmet supported by the head has the advantage that the diver can turn the helmet to face the job without having to turn the entire upper torso. This is particularly an advantage when looking upwards. This allows the helmet to have a relatively small faceplate, which reduces overall volume and hence the weight.

Demand breathing systems reduce the amount of gas required to adequately ventilate the diver, as it needs only to be supplied when the diver inhales, but the slightly increased work of breathing caused by this system is a disadvantage at extreme levels of exertion, where free-flow systems may be better. The demand system is also quieter than free-flow, particularly during the non-inhalation phase of breathing. This can make voice communication more effective. The breathing of the diver is also audible to the surface team over the communications system, and this helps to monitor the condition of the diver and is a valuable safety feature.

==== Open circuit demand helmets ====
The open circuit demand system exhausts gas to the environment at ambient pressure (or a very small difference from ambient pressure required to open the exhaust valve). As a result, all exhaled gas is lost to the surroundings. For most surface orientated commercial diving where air is the breathing gas in use, this is no problem, as air is cheap and freely available. Even with nitrox it is generally more cost effective to use open circuit, as oxygen is an easily available and relatively inexpensive gas, and blending nitrox is technologically simple, both to mix and to analyse.

==== Reclaim helmets ====
In the case of compressed air, or nitrox mixtures, the exhaled gas is not valuable enough to justify the expense of recycling, but helium-based mixtures are considerably more expensive, and as the depth increases, the amount of gas used (in terms of mass, or number of molecules) increases in direct proportion to the ambient pressure. As a result, gas cost is a significant factor in deep open circuit diving with helium-based mixtures for long periods. By using a return line for the exhaled gas, it can be recompressed and used again, almost indefinitely. It is necessary to remove carbon dioxide from the reclaimed gas, but this is relatively cheap and uncomplicated. It is generally removed by a scrubber, which is a filter packed with a chemical which reacts with and removes the carbon dioxide from the gas. The reclaimed gas is also filtered to remove odour and microorganisms, and oxygen is added to the required concentration. The gas is compressed for storage between uses. Recovery of the exhaled gas requires special equipment. Simply venting it to a return hose through a non-return valve will not work, as the hose must be maintained at exactly the ambient pressure at the depth of the helmet, otherwise the gas from the helmet will either free-flow out under pressure, or not flow out at all because of back pressure. This obstacle is overcome by using a back-pressure regulator exhaust valve, which opens the exhaust valve by using the leverage of a diaphragm sensing the pressure difference between the helmet interior pressure and the ambient pressure, This only requires the pressure in the reclaim hose to be lower than ambient at the diver to function. The same principle is used in a diving chamber's built-in breathing system (BIBS).

=== Free flow helmets ===
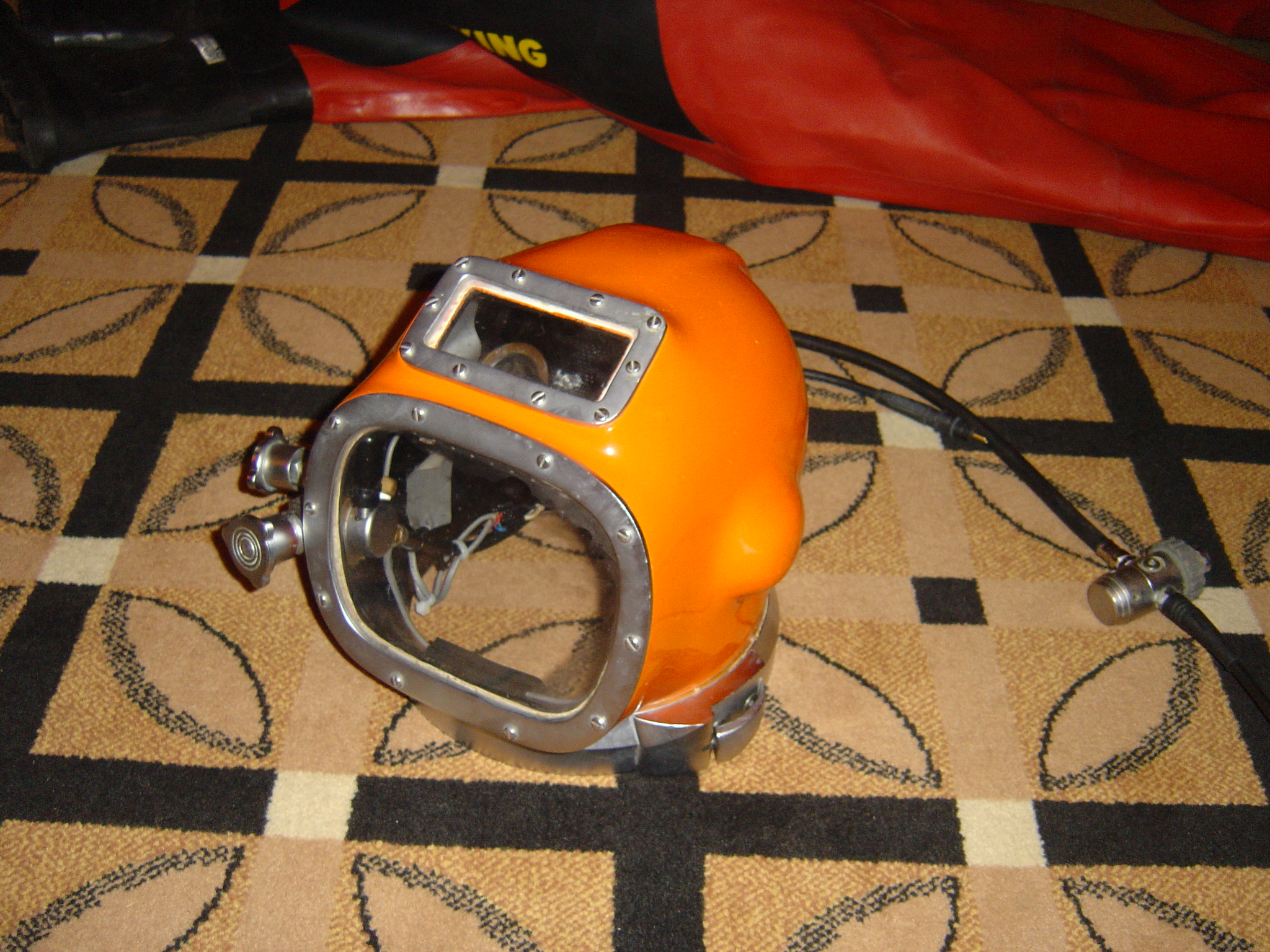
Front view of an AH3 free flow diving helmet

A free flow helmet supplies a continuous flow of air to the diver, and he breathes this as it flows past. Work of breathing is minimal, but flow rate must be high if the diver works hard, and this is noisy, affecting communications and requiring hearing protection to avoid damage to the ears. This type of helmet is popular where divers have to work hard in relatively shallow water for long periods. It is also useful when diving in contaminated environments, where the helmet is sealed onto a dry suit, and the entire system is kept at a slight positive pressure by adjusting the back-pressure of the exhaust valve, to ensure that there is no leakage into the helmet. This type of helmet is often large in volume, and as it is attached to the suit, it does not move with the head. The diver must move his body to face anything he wants to see. For this reason the faceplate is large and there is often an upper window or side windows to improve the field of vision.

==== Standard diving helmet (Copper hat) ====
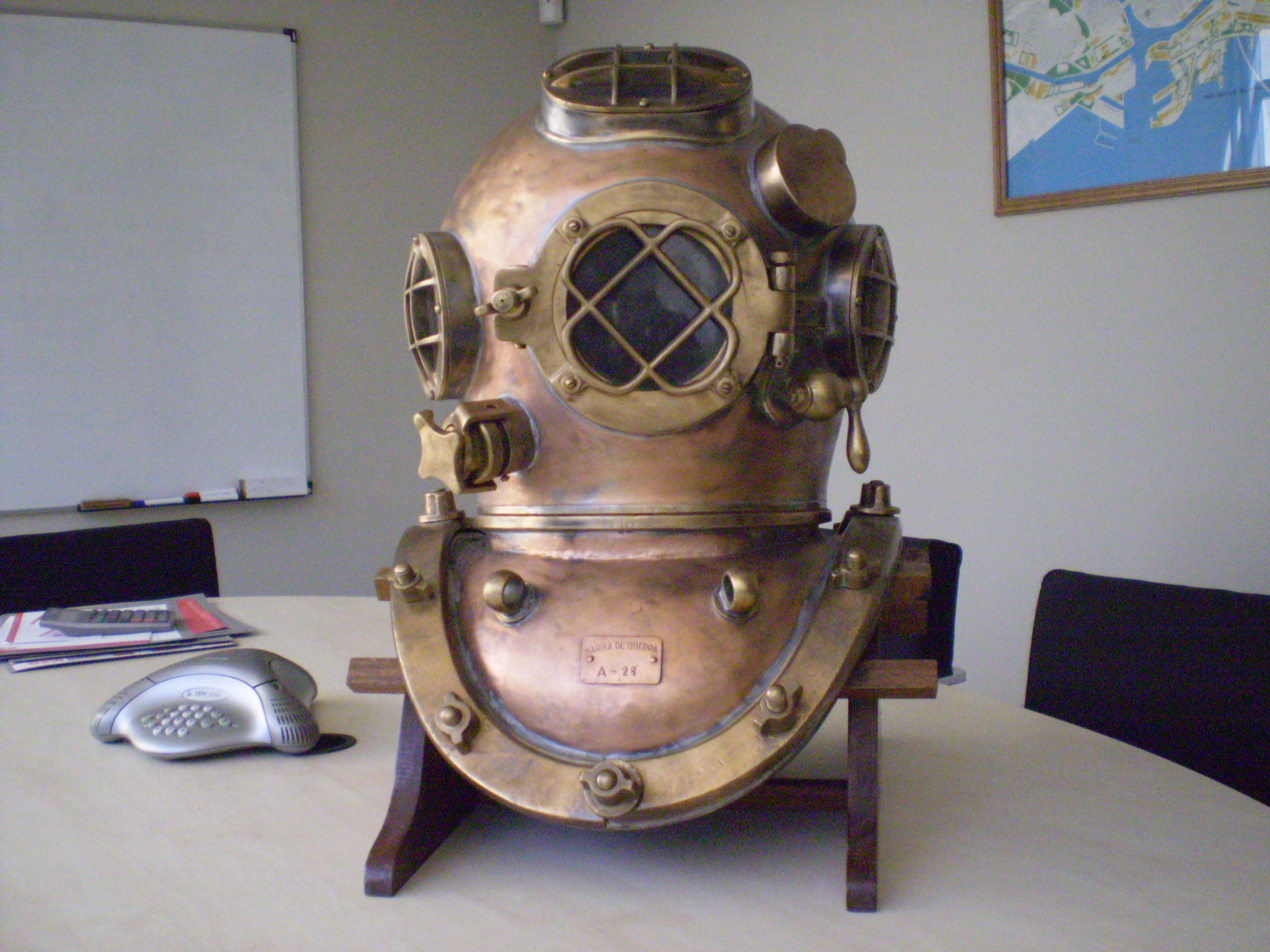
Copper diving helmet with threaded connection between bonnet and corselet

The helmet is usually made of two main parts: the bonnet, which covers the diver's head, and the corselet which supports the weight of the helmet on the diver's shoulders, and is clamped to the suit to create a watertight seal. The bonnet is attached and sealed to the corselet at the neck, either by bolts or an interrupted screw-thread, with some form of locking mechanism.

The helmet may be described by the number of bolts which hold it to the suit or to the corselet, and the number of vision ports, known as lights. For example, a helmet with four vision ports, and twelve studs securing the suit to the corselet, would be known as a "four light, twelve bolt helmet", and a three-bolt helmet used three bolts to secure the bonnet to the corselet, clamping the flange of the neck seal between the two parts of the helmet.

When the telephone was invented, it was applied to the standard diving dress for greatly improved communication with the diver.

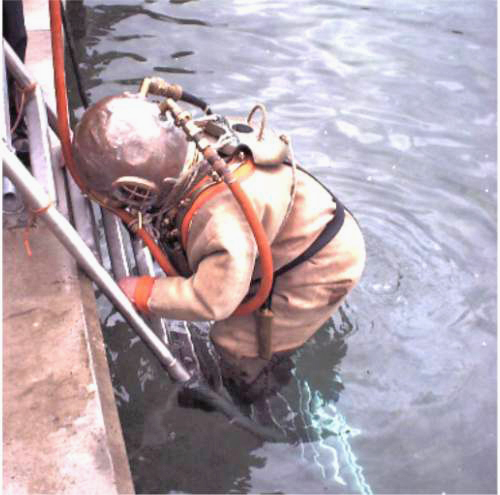
Diver in standard dress entering the water

The bonnet is usually a copper shell with soldered brass fittings. It covers the diver's head and provides sufficient space to turn the head to look out of the glazed faceplate and other viewports (windows). The front port can usually be opened for ventilation and communication when the diver is on deck, by being screwed out or swung to the side on a hinge. The other lights (another name for the viewports) are generally fixed. Viewports were glass on the early helmets, with some of the later helmets using acrylic, and are usually protected by brass or bronze grilles. The helmet has fittings to connect the air line and the diver's telephone.

All except the earliest helmets include a non-return valve where the airline is connected, which prevents potentially fatal helmet squeeze if the pressure in the hose is lost. The difference in pressure between the surface and the diver can be so great that if the air line is cut at or near the surface and there is no non-return valve, the diver would be partly squeezed into the helmet by the external pressure, and injured or possibly killed.

Helmets also have a spring-loaded exhaust valve which allows excess air to leave the helmet. The spring force is adjustable by the diver to prevent the suit from deflating completely or over-inflating and the diver being floated uncontrollably to the surface. Some helmets have an extra manual valve known as a spit-cock, which can be used to vent excess air when the diver is in a position where the main exhaust can not function correctly.

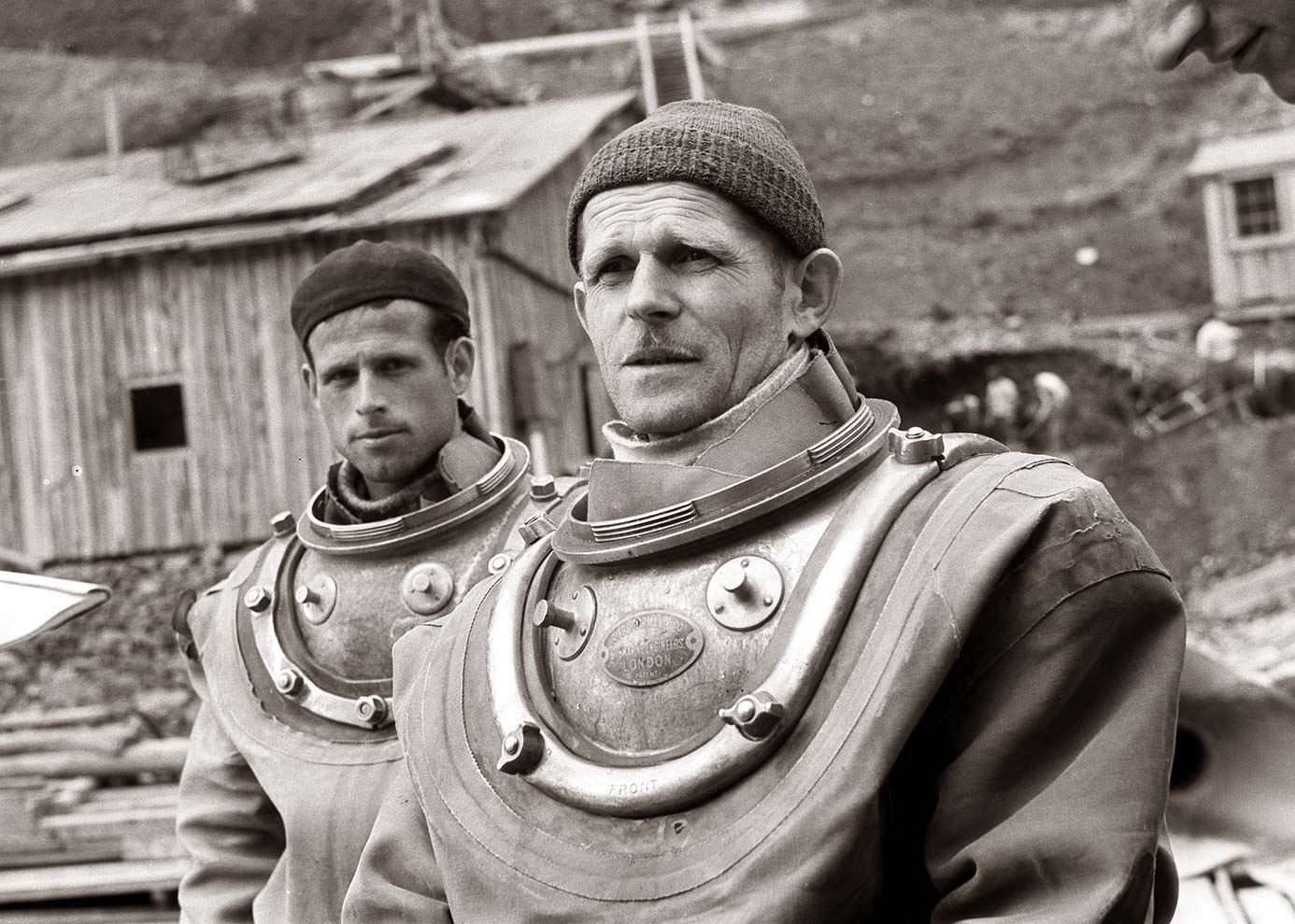
Corselet showing interrupted thread for helmet connection and brailes clamping it to the suit. 12-bolt in background, 6-bolt in foreground.

The corselet, also known as a breastplate or gorget, is an oval or rectangular collar-piece resting on the shoulders, chest and back, to support the helmet and seal it to the suit, usually made from copper and brass, but occasionally steel. The helmet is usually connected to the suit by placing the holes around the rubberised collar of the suit over bolts along the rim of the corselet, and then clamping the brass straps known as brailes against the collar with wing nuts to press the rubber against the metal of the corselet rim to make a water-tight seal. An alternative method was to bolt the bonnet to the corselet over a rubber collar bonded to the top of the suit.

Most six and twelve bolt bonnets are joined to the corselet by 1/8th turn interrupted thread. The helmet neck thread is placed onto the neck of the corselet facing the divers left front, where the threads do not engage, and then rotated forward, engaging the thread and seating on a leather gasket to make a watertight seal. The helmet usually has a safety lock which prevents the bonnet from rotating back and separating underwater. Other styles of connection are also used, with the joint secured by clamps or bolts (usually three).

==== Gas extenders ====
Semi-closed rebreather technology is sometimes used in diver carried surface supplied gas extenders, mainly to reduce helium use. Some units also function as an emergency gas supply using on-board bailout cylinders: The US Navy MK29 rebreather can extend the duration of the Flyaway Mixed Gas System diving operations by five times while retaining the original mixed-gas storage footprint on the support ship. The Soviet IDA-72 semi-closed rebreather has a scrubber endurance of 4 hours on surface supply, and bailout endurance at 200m of 40 minutes on on-board gas. The US Navy Mark V Mod 1 heliox mixed gas helmet has a scrubber canister mounted on the back of the helmet and an inlet gas injection system which recirculates the breathing gas through the scrubber to remove carbon dioxide and thereby conserve helium. The injector nozzle would blow 11 times the volume of the injected gas through the scrubber.

=== Band masks ===
A band mask is a heavy duty full-face mask with many of the characteristics of a lightweight demand helmet. In structure it is the front section of a lightweight helmet from above the faceplate to below the demand valve and exhaust ports, including the bailout block and communications connections on the sides. This rigid frame is attached to a neoprene hood by a metal clamping band, hence the name. It is provided with a padded sealing surface around the frame edge which is held firmly against the diver's face by a rubber "spider", a multiple strap arrangement with a pad behind the diver's head, and usually five straps which hook onto pins on the band. The straps have several holes so the tension can be adjusted to get a comfortable seal. A band mask is heavier than other full face masks, but lighter than a helmet, and can be donned more quickly than a helmet. They are often used by the standby diver for this reason.

=== Full-face masks ===
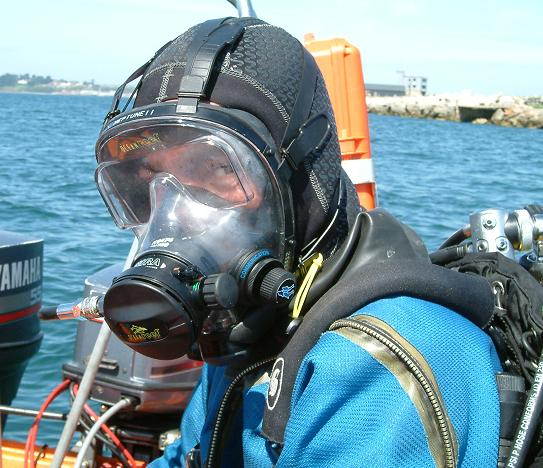
A diver wearing an Ocean Reef full face mask

A full-face mask encloses both mouth and nose, which reduces the risk of the diver losing the air supply compared to a half mask and demand valve. Some models require a bailout block to provide alternative breathing gas supply from the umbilical and bailout cylinder, but are not suitable for accepting an alternative air supply from a rescue diver, while a few models accept a secondary demand valve which can be plugged into an accessory port (Draeger, Apeks and Ocean Reef). The unique Kirby Morgan 48 SuperMask has a removable DV pod which can be unclipped to allow the diver to breathe from a standard scuba demand valve with mouthpiece.

Despite the improvement in diver safety provided by the more secure attachment of the breathing apparatus to the diver's face, some models of full face mask can fail catastrophically if the faceplate is broken or detached from the skirt, as there is then no way to breathe from the mask. This can be mitigated by carrying a standard secondary second stage, and preferably also a spare half mask.

A full face mask is lighter and more comfortable for swimming than a helmet or band mask, and usually provides an improved field of vision, but it is not as secure, and does not provide the same level of protection as the heavier and more sturdily constructed equipment. The two types of equipment have different ranges of application. Most full face masks are adaptable for use with scuba or surface supply. The full face mask does not usually have a bailout block fitted, and this is usually attached to the diver's harness, with a single hose to supply the mask from main or bailout gas which is selected at the block. The strap arrangement for full face masks is usually quite secure, but not as secure as a bandmask or helmet, and it is possible for it to be dislodged in the water. However it is also quite practicable for a trained diver to replace and clear a full face mask under water without assistance, so this is more an inconvenience than a disaster unless the diver is rendered unconscious at the same time.

== Breathing gas supply ==
Surface-supplied diving may use compressed air or mixed gas as the breathing gas, depending on circumstances. The breathing gas is delivered from a source at the surface to the diver underwater via a hose and one of several options for distribution, monitoring, and control.

=== Diver's umbilical ===
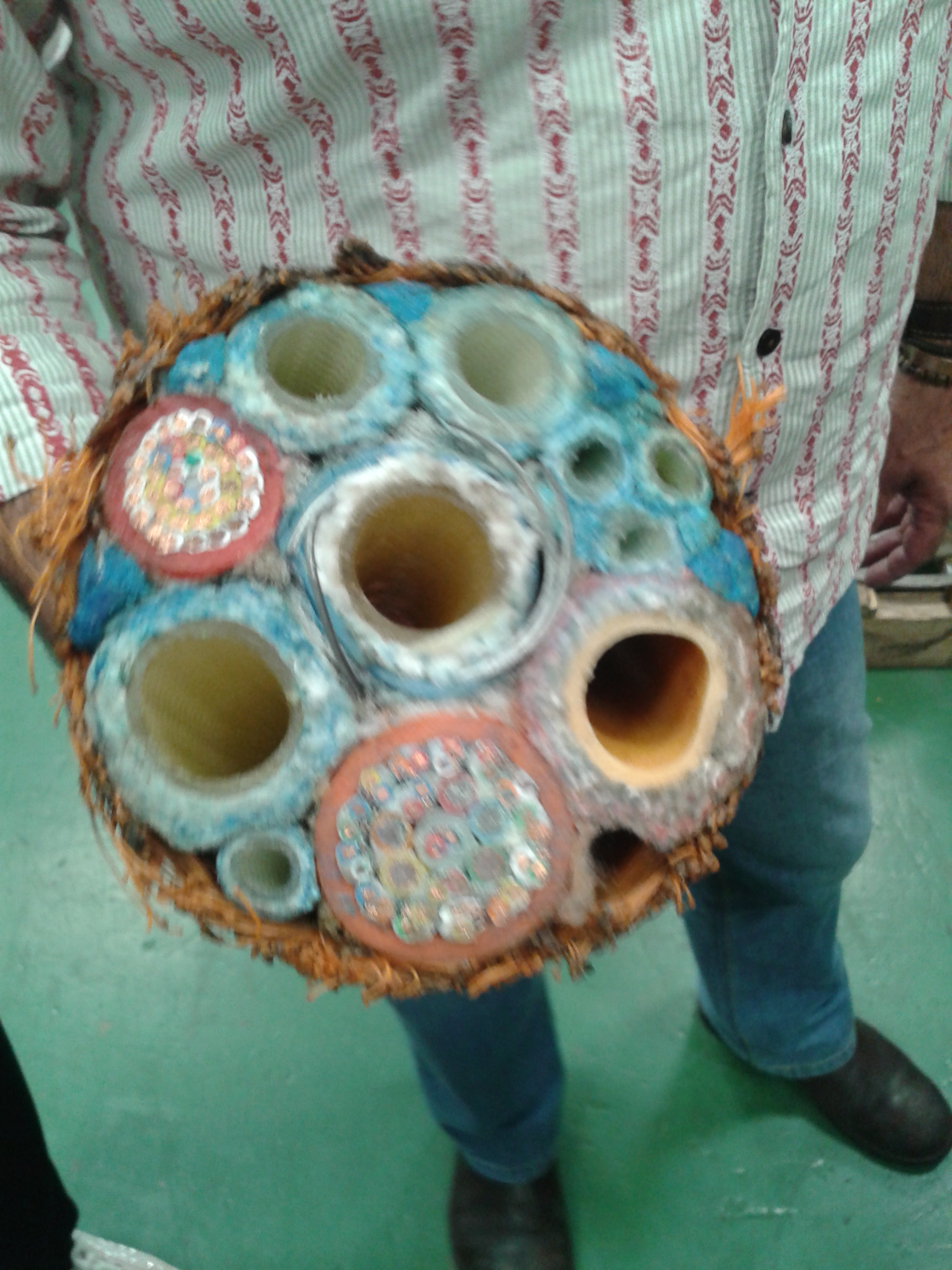
Bell umbilical section, containing among other components, hot water supply hoses.

The umbilical is the standard option for delivery for commercial diving operations. It contains a hose to supply the breathing gas and usually several other components, which may be stipulated by legislation or code of practice. These usually include a communications cable (comms wire), a pneumofathometer, and a strength member, which may be the airline hose, the communications cable, or a rope. When needed, a hot water supply line, helium reclaim line, video camera and lighting cables may be included. These components are bundled and taped, or neatly twisted into a multistrand cable, and are deployed as a single unit. The diver's end has underwater connectors for the electrical cables, and the air hoses are usually connected to the helmet, band mask, or bailout block by JIC fittings. A screw-gate carabiner or similar connector is provided on the strength member for attachment to the diver's harness, and may be used to lift the diver in an emergency. Similar connections are provided for attachment to the diving bell, if used, or to the surface gas panel and communications equipment. A diver's umbilical supplied from a bell gas panel is called an excursion umbilical, and the supply from the surface to the bell panel is the bell umbilical.

=== Air-line ===
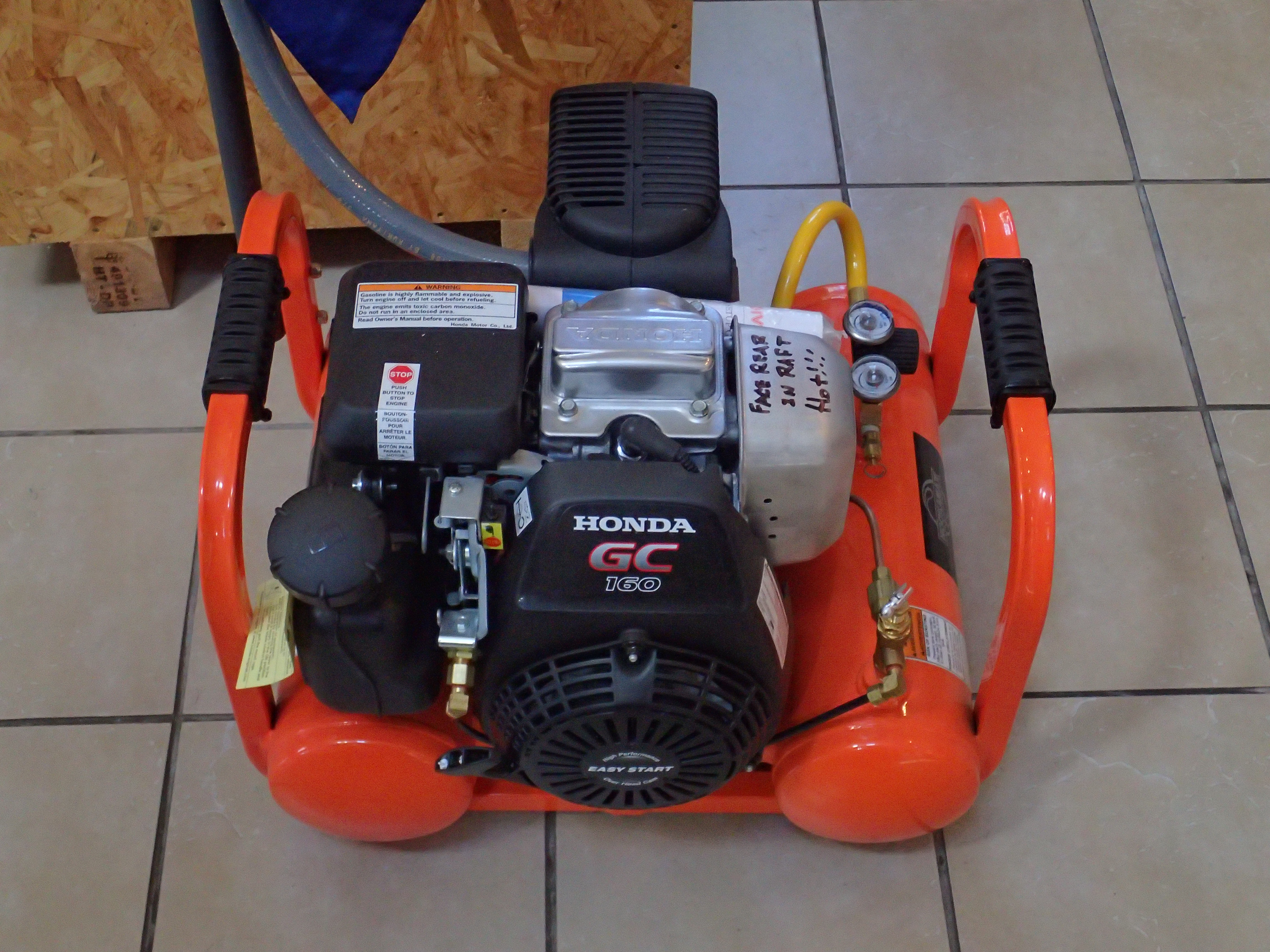
Low pressure breathing air compressor intended for air-line diving

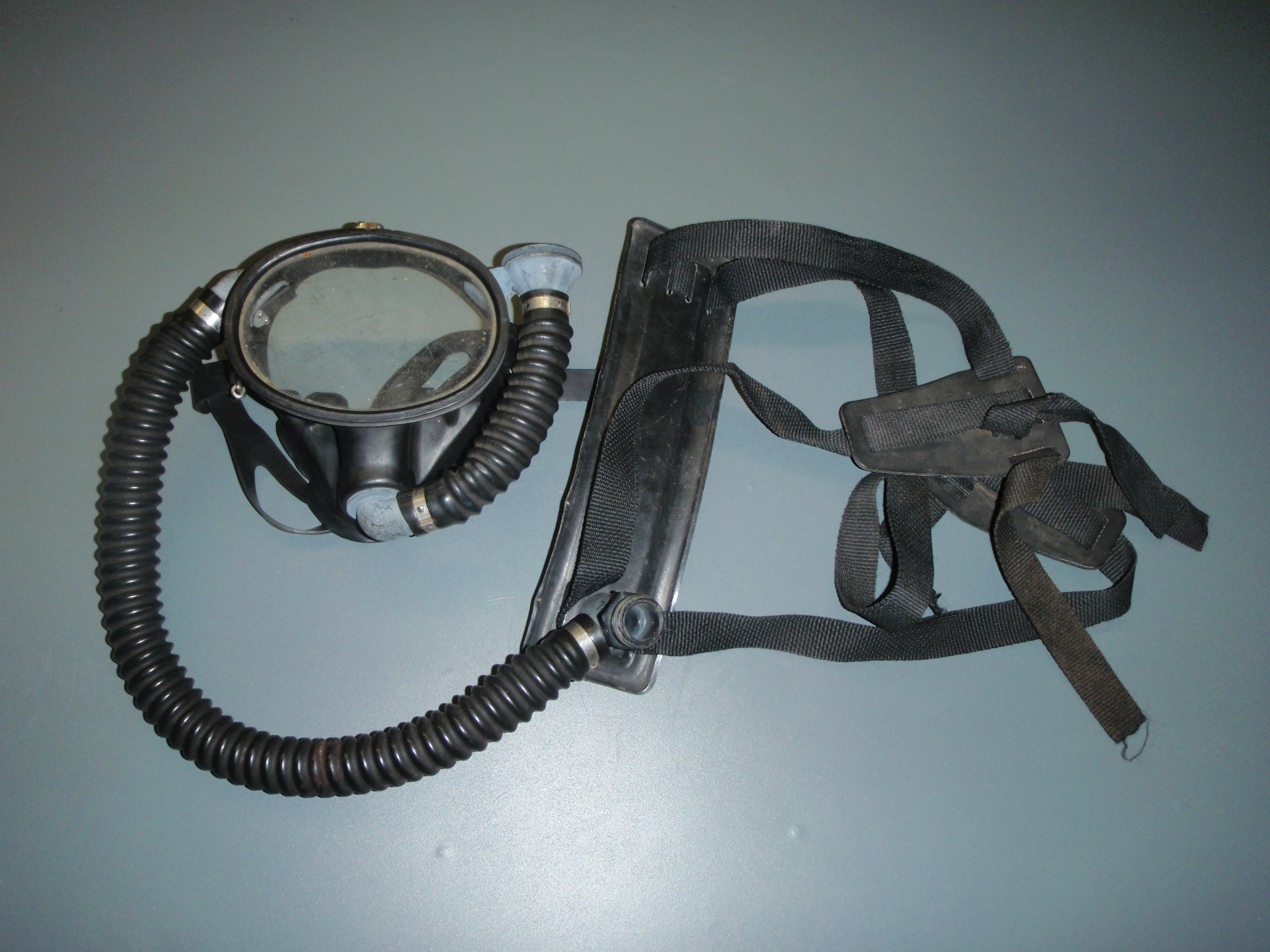
A lightweight full face mask used with a free flow air-line system (obsolescent)

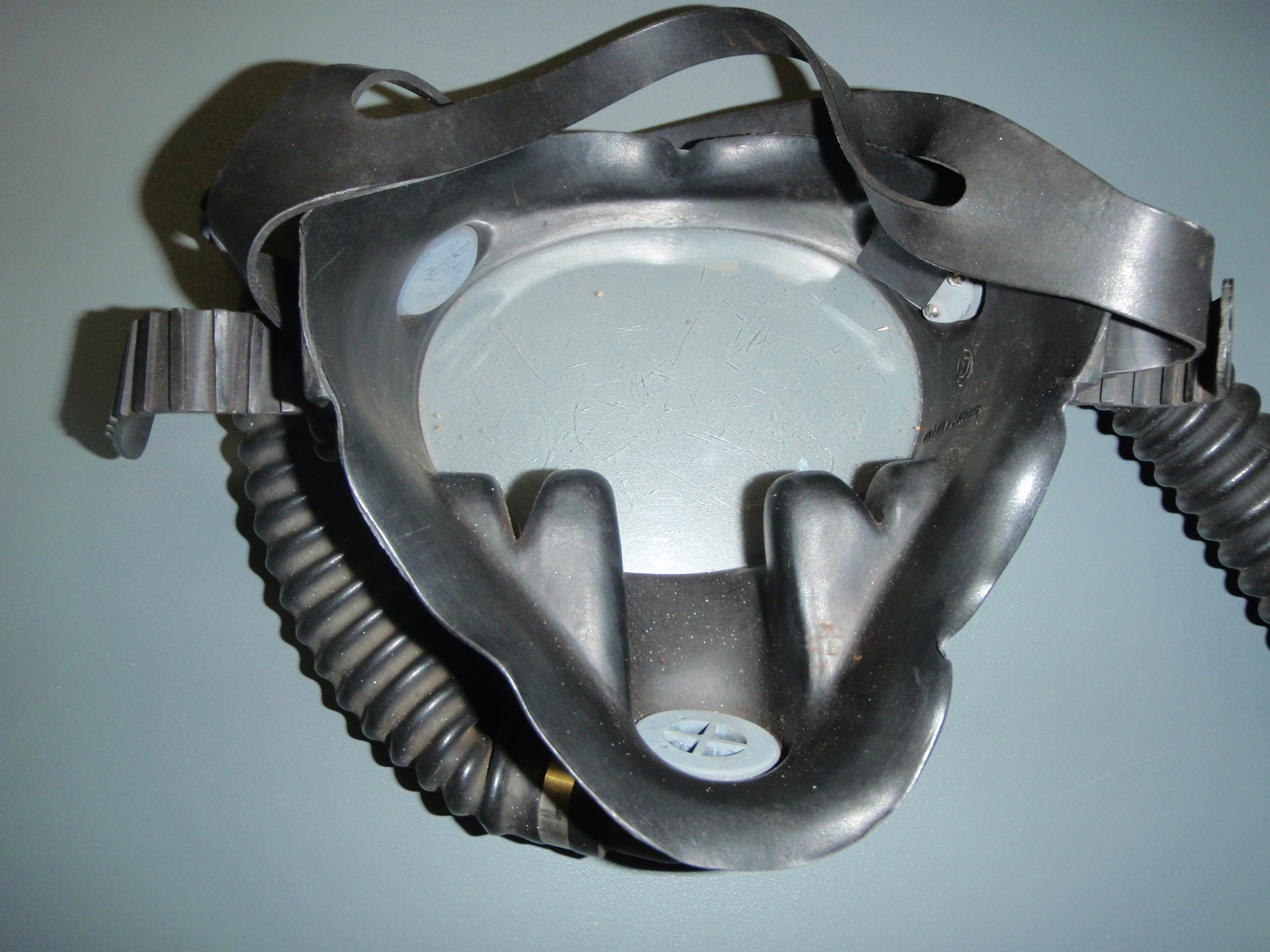
Inside view of a lightweight free-flow air-line mask (obsolescent)

Hookah, Sasuba and Snuba systems are categorised as "air-line" equipment, as they do not include the communication, lifeline and pneumofathometer hose characteristic of a full diver's umbilical. Most hookah diving uses a demand system based on a standard scuba second stage, but there have been special purpose free-flow full-face masks specifically intended for hookah diving (see photos). A bailout system, or emergency gas supply (EGS) is not an inherent part of an air-line diving system, though it may be required in some applications.

Their field of application is very different from full surface-supplied diving. Hookah is generally used for shallow water work in low-hazard applications, such as archaeology, aquaculture, and aquarium maintenance work, but is also sometimes used for open water hunting and gathering of seafood, shallow water mining of gold and diamonds in rivers and streams, and bottom cleaning and other underwater maintenance of boats. Sasuba and Snuba are mainly a shallow water recreational application for low-hazard sites. Sasuba and hookah diving equipment is also used for boat maintenance and hull cleaning, swimming pool maintenance, and shallow underwater inspections.

The systems used to supply air through the hose to a demand valve mouthpiece, are either 12-volt electrical air pumps, gasoline engine powered low-pressure compressors, or floating scuba cylinders with high pressure regulators. These hookah diving systems usually limit the hose length to allow less than 7 metres depth. The exception is the gasoline engine powered unit, which requires a much higher level of training and topside supervision for safe use.

The air-line breathing air compressor compresses clean atmospheric air and stores it in a receiver tank, using an overpressure valve to limit the pressure. The air passes through a filter and the air hose to the diver's demand valve. Small 12 volt diaphragm compressors are used for recreational hookah, with a delivery of around 1.8 bars (26 psi), which severely limits the depth to which air can be supplied. The rubber diaphragm pump usually requires no oil lubricant and delivers oil-free air.

Piston compressors for hookah deliver air at higher pressures, up to about 9 bars (130 psi), and are usually driven by a small 4-stroke petrol engine. They are usually oil lubricated, using a breathing air rated mineral or synthetic oil without toxic additives. This type of compressor requires a filter to clean the air before delivery to the diver. Delivery pressure for 12 metres (39 ft) is about 20 to 35 pounds per square inch (1.4 to 2.4 bar) using a hookah regulator. Depths of 40 metres (130 ft) require up to 9 bars (130 psi). The pressure relief valve will blow off excess air delivered at low demand, to protect the system from overpressure loads, while delivering sufficient air for higher exertion.

The air line hose should be rated for breathing air, with a bore of 8 to 10 millimetres (0.31 to 0.39 in). It is usually buoyant to minimise snagging on the bottom, particularly if not tended from the surface. Demand valves intended for use with low pressure air line may use a tilt valve for low cracking effort. Scuba demand valves may need modification to work effectively at low delivery pressure.

=== Gas panel ===
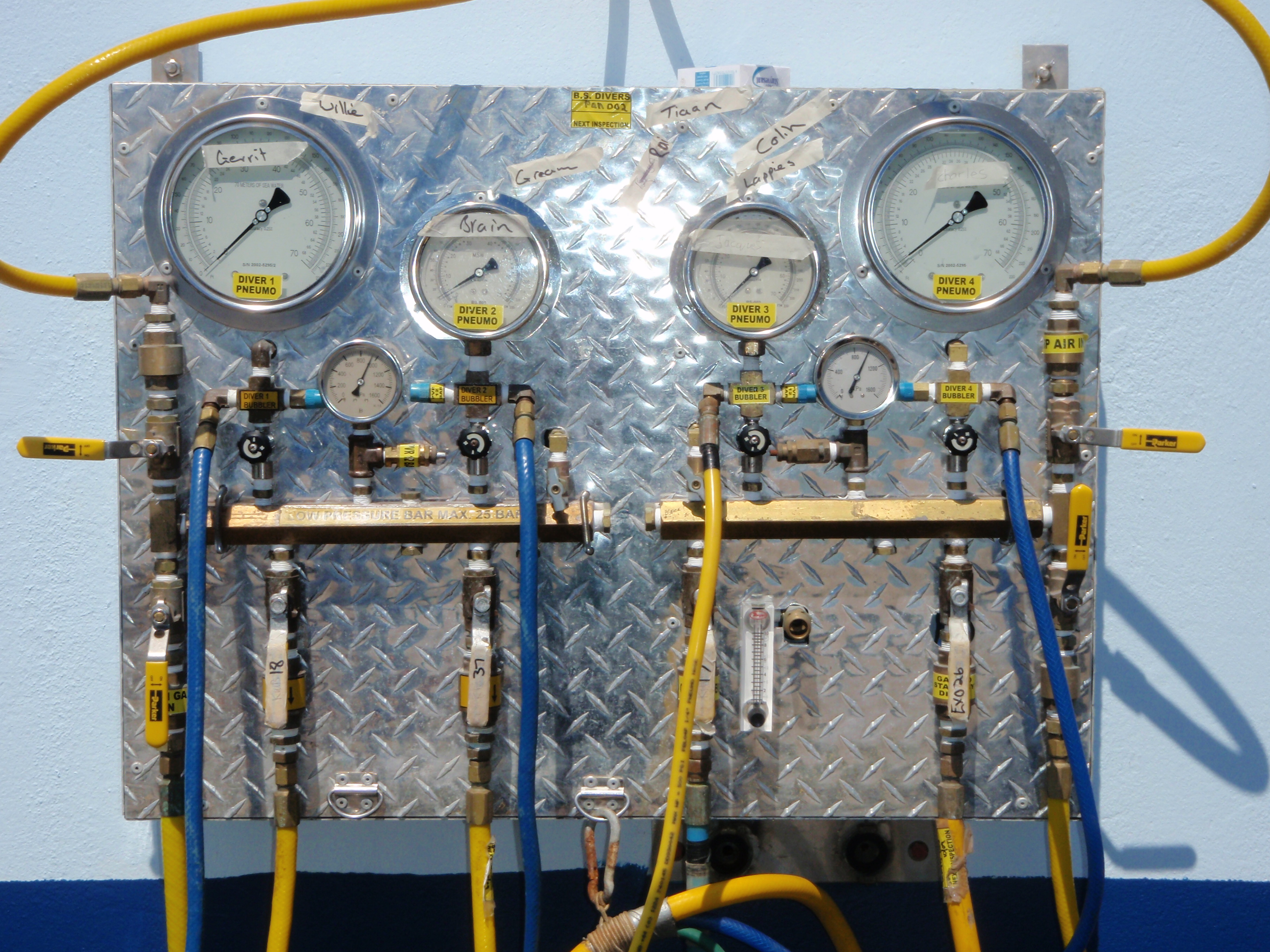
A surface supply panel for four divers. This panel can use an independent gas supply for each side of the panel

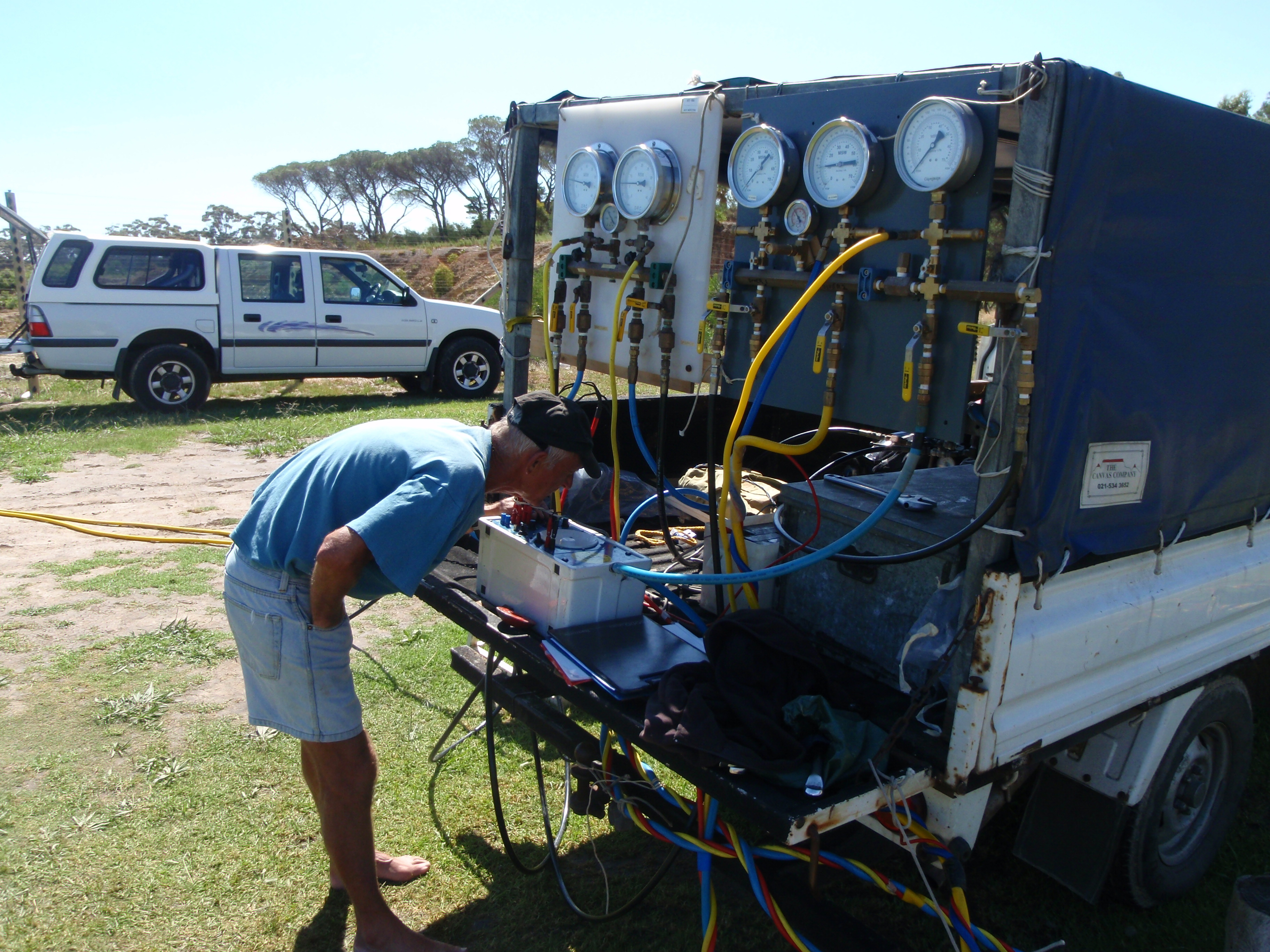
Surface supply air panels. On the left for two divers, on the right for three divers

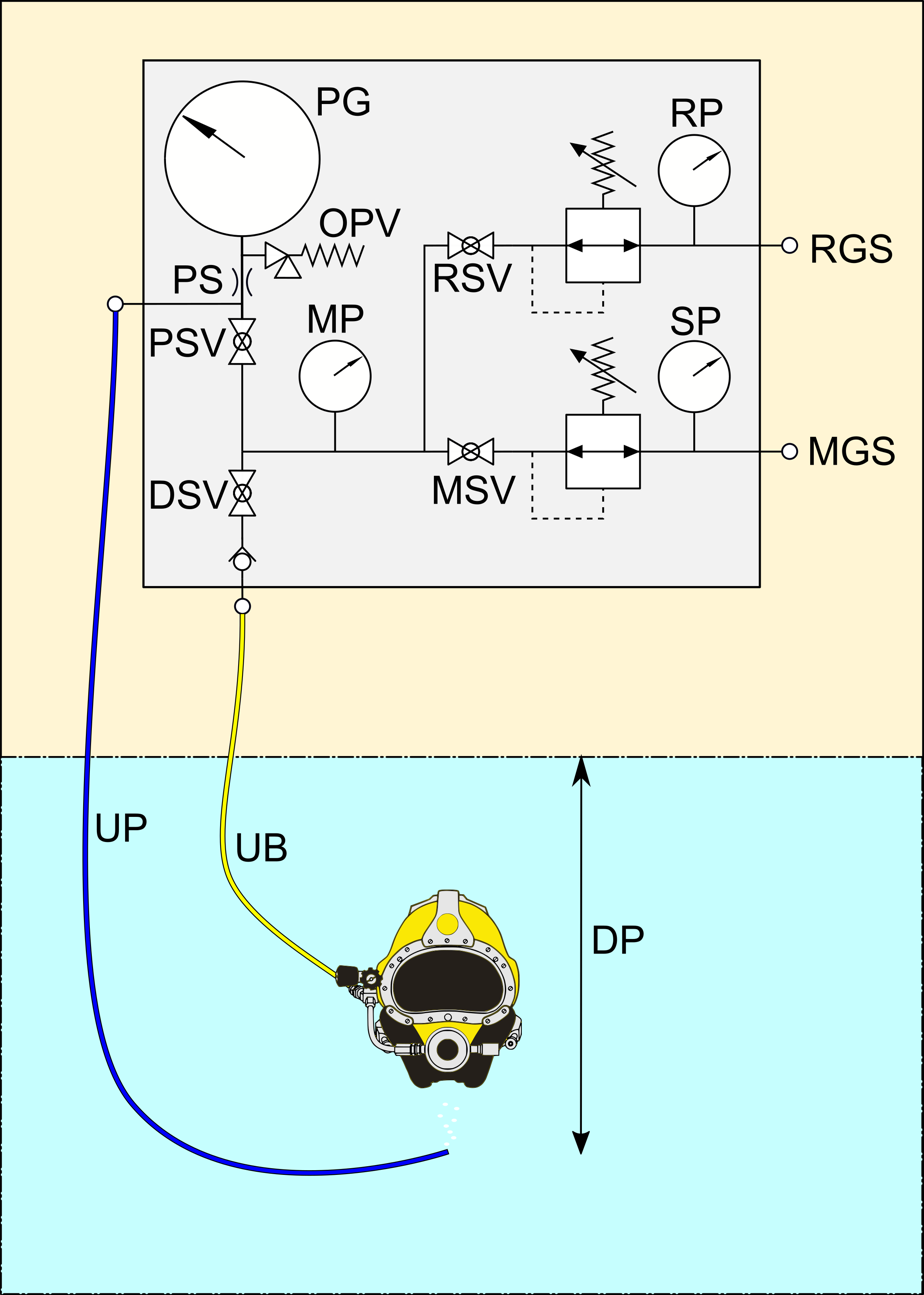
Surface supplied diving gas panel for one diver: PG: pneumofathometer gauge; OPV: overpressure valve; PS: pneumo snubber; PSV: pneumo supply valve; DSV: diver supply valve; MP: manifold pressure; RSV: reserve supply valve; RP: reserve pressure; MSV: main supply valve; SP: supply pressure; RGS: reserve gas supply; MGS: main gas supply; UP: umbilical pneumo hose; UB: umbilical breathing gas hose; DP: depth measured by pneumofathometer

A gas panel or gas manifold is the control equipment for supplying the breathing gas to the divers. Primary and reserve gas is supplied to the panel through shutoff valves from a low-pressure compressor or high-pressure storage cylinders ("bombs", "bundles", "quads", or "kellys"). The gas pressure may be controlled at the panel by an industrial pressure regulator, or it may already be regulated closer to the source (at the compressor, or at the storage cylinder outlet). The supply gas pressure is monitored on a gauge at the panel, and an over-pressure valve is fitted in case the supply pressure is too high. The gas panel may be operated by the diving supervisor if the breathing gas is air or a fixed ratio premix, but if the composition must be controlled or monitored during the dive it is usual for a dedicated gas panel operator, or "gas man" to do this work.

There is a set of valves and gauges for each diver to be supplied from the panel. These include:

- A main supply valve with non-return valve, which supplies gas to the main gas supply hose of the umbilical. This is usually a quarter-turn valve, as it must be quick to operate and obvious whether it is open or closed.
- A pneumofathometer supply valve, which supplies gas to the pneumofathometer for the diver. This valve is usually near the main supply valve but with a different handle. It is usually a needle type valve as it must be finely adjustable, but it must also be large enough to allow a fairly high flow rate, as the air may be used as an alternative breathing air source, or to fill small lift bags.
- A pneumofathometer gauge is connected to the pneumo line. This is a high resolution pressure gauge calibrated in feet sea water (fsw) and/or metres sea water (msw). and is used to measure the depth of the diver by allowing air to flow through the pneumo hose and out the end attached to the diver. When the air supply is shut off, and the flow stops, the gauge indicates the pressure at the open end at the diver.
- Each pneumofathometer gauge has an overpressure valve to protect it against gas supply at higher pressure than it is designed to take. This is essential as the main supply pressure is significantly higher than the maximum depth pressure on the pneumo gauge. There is also often a snubbing valve or orifice between the pneumo line and the gauge to restrict flow into the gauge and ensure that the overpressure valve can adequately relieve the pressure.
- Some gas panels have a separate supply gauge for each diver downstream of the supply valve, but this is not standard practice.

The gas panel may be fairly large and mounted on a board for convenience of use, or may be compact and mounted inside a portable box, for ease of transport. Gas panels are usually for one, two or three divers. In some countries, or under some codes of practice, the surface standby diver must be supplied from a separate panel to the working diver/s.

A wet or closed bell will be fitted with a bell gas panel to supply gas to the divers' excursion umbilicals. The bell gas panel is supplied with primary gas from the surface via a bell umbilical, and on-board emergency gas from high-pressure storage cylinders mounted on the frame of the bell.

==== Pneumofathometer ====
A pneumofathometer is a device used to measure the depth of a diver by displaying the back-pressure on a gas supply hose with an open end at the diver, and a flow rate with negligible resistance in the hose. The pressure indicated is the hydrostic pressure at the depth of the open end, and is usually displayed in units of metres or feet of seawater, the same units used for decompression calculations.

The pneumo line is usually a 0.25 inches (6.4 mm) bore hose in the diver's umbilical, supplied with breathing gas from the gas panel via a supply valve. Downstream from the valve there is a branch to a high resolution pressure gauge, a restriction to flow to the gauge, and an overpressure relief valve to protect the gauge from full panel supply pressure in case the pneumo line is used for emergency breathing gas supply. Each diver has an independent pneumofathometer, and if there is a bell, it will also have an independent pneumofathometer.

=== Low-pressure breathing air compressor ===
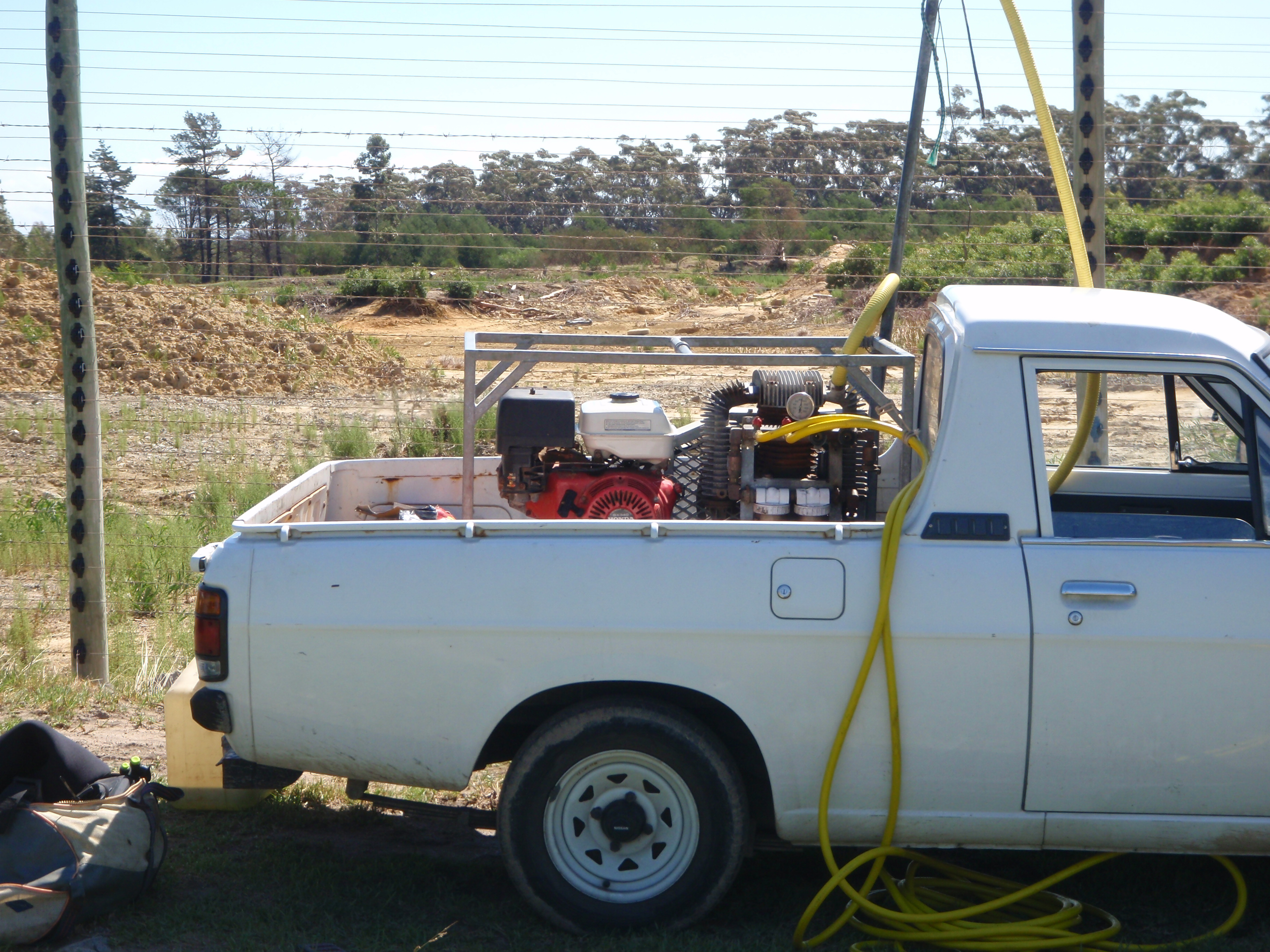
A low-pressure compressor on site providing breathing air for surface-supplied divers

A low-pressure compressor is often the air supply of choice for surface-supplied diving, as it is virtually unlimited in the amount of air it can supply, provided the delivery volume and pressure are adequate for the application. A low-pressure compressor can run for tens of hours, needing only refueling, periodical filter drainage and occasional running checks, and is therefore more convenient than high-pressure storage cylinders for primary air supply.

It is critical to diver safety that the compressor is suitable for breathing air delivery, uses a suitable oil, is adequately filtered, and takes in clean and uncontaminated air. Positioning of the intake opening is important, and may have to be changed if the relative wind direction changes, to ensure that no engine exhaust gas enters the intake. Various national standards for breathing air quality may apply.

Power for portable compressors is usually a 4-stroke petrol (gasoline) engine. Larger, trailer mounted compressors, may be diesel powered. Permanently installed compressors on dive support boats are likely to be powered by 3-phase electric motors.

The compressor should be provided with an accumulator (also known as a volume tank, receiver, or air reserve tank), and a relief valve. The accumulator functions as an additional water trap, but the main purpose is to provide a reserve volume of pressurised air. The relief valve allows any excess air to be released back to the atmosphere while retaining the appropriate supply pressure in the accumulator.

=== High pressure main gas supply ===
The main gas supply for surface-supplied diving can be from high pressure bulk storage cylinders. When the storage cylinders are relatively portable this is known as a scuba replacement system in the commercial diving industry. The application is versatile and can ensure high quality breathing gas in places where atmospheric air is too contaminated to use through a normal low pressure compressor filter system, and is easily adaptable to a mixed gas supply and oxygen decompression provided that the breathing apparatus and gas supply system are compatible with the mixtures to be used. Scuba replacement is often used from smaller diving support vessels, for emergency work, and for hazmat diving.

Mixed breathing gases are provided from high pressure bulk storage systems for saturation diving, but these are less portable, and generally involve manifolded racks of cylinders of approximately 50 litres water capacity arranged as quads and even larger racks of high pressure tubes. If gas reclaim systems are used, the reclaimed gas is scrubbed of carbon dioxide, filtered of other contaminants, and recompressed into high pressure cylinders for interim storage, ans is generally blended with oxygen or helium to make up the required mix for the next dive before re-use.

=== Decompression gas ===
Reducing the partial pressure of the inert gas component of the breathing mixture will accelerate decompression as the concentration gradient will be greater for a given depth. This is achieved by increasing the fraction of oxygen in the breathing gas used, whereas substitution of a different inert gas will not produce the desired effect. Any substitution may introduce counter-diffusion complications, owing to differing rates of diffusion of the inert gases, which can lead to a net gain in total dissolved gas tension in a tissue. This can lead to bubble formation and growth, with decompression sickness as a consequence. Partial pressure of oxygen is usually limited to 1.6 bar during in-water decompression for scuba divers, but can be up to 1.9 bar in-water and 2.2 bar in the chamber when using the US Navy tables for surface decompression,

=== High-pressure reserve gas ===
An alternative to a low-pressure compressor for gas supply is high-pressure gas storage cylinders feeding through a pressure regulator which will be set to the required supply pressure for the depth and equipment in use. In practice HP storage may be used for either reserve gas supply or both main and reserve gas supplies to a gas panel. High-pressure bulk cylinders are quiet in operation and provide gas of known quality (if it has been tested). This allows the relatively simple and reliable use of nitrox mixtures in surface-supplied diving. Bulk cylinders are also quiet in operation compared to a low-pressure compressor, but have the obvious limitation of amount of gas available. The usual configurations for surface-supplied bulk gas storage are large single cylinders of around 50 litres water capacity, often referred to as "J"s or "bombs", "quads", which are a group (sometimes, but not necessarily four in number) of similar cylinders mounted on a frame and connected together to a common supply fitting, and "kellys" which are a group of "gas storage tubes" (long large volume seamless transportable gas storage pressure vessels, with water capacity between 150 litres (5.3 cu ft) and 3,000 litres (110 cu ft)) usually mounted in a container frame or trailer, and usually connected together to a manifold with a common connection fitting.

=== Emergency gas supply ===
The professional diver is usually required to carry an emergency gas supply with sufficient gas to reach a place of safety in an emergency involving failure of the surface supplied gas. For surface oriented dives, this may require sufficient gas for planned decompression.

==== Bailout cylinder ====
An emergency gas supply (bailout gas) is usually carried by the diver in a scuba cylinder, mounted on the back of the harness in the same position as is used with recreational scuba. The size of the cylinder will depend on operational variables, such as depth. There should be sufficient gas to enable the diver to reach a place of safety on the bailout gas in an emergency. For surface oriented dives, this may require gas for decompression, and bailout sets generally start at about 7 litres internal capacity and can be larger.

For bell dives there is no requirement for decompression gas, as the bell itself carries emergency decompression gas. However at extreme depths the diver will use gas fast, and there have been cases where twin 10 litre 300 bar sets were required to supply sufficient gas. Another option which has been used for extreme depth is a rebreather bailout set. A limitation for this service is that the diver must be able to get in and out of the bell while wearing the bailout equipment.

The bailout cylinder may be mounted with the valve at the top or at the bottom, depending on local codes of practice. A generally used arrangement is to mount the cylinder with the valve up, as this is better protected while kitting up, and the cylinder valve is left fully open while the diver is in the water. This means that the regulator and supply hose to the bailout block will be pressurised during the dive, and ready for immediate use by opening the bailout valve on the harness or helmet.

==== Bailout block ====
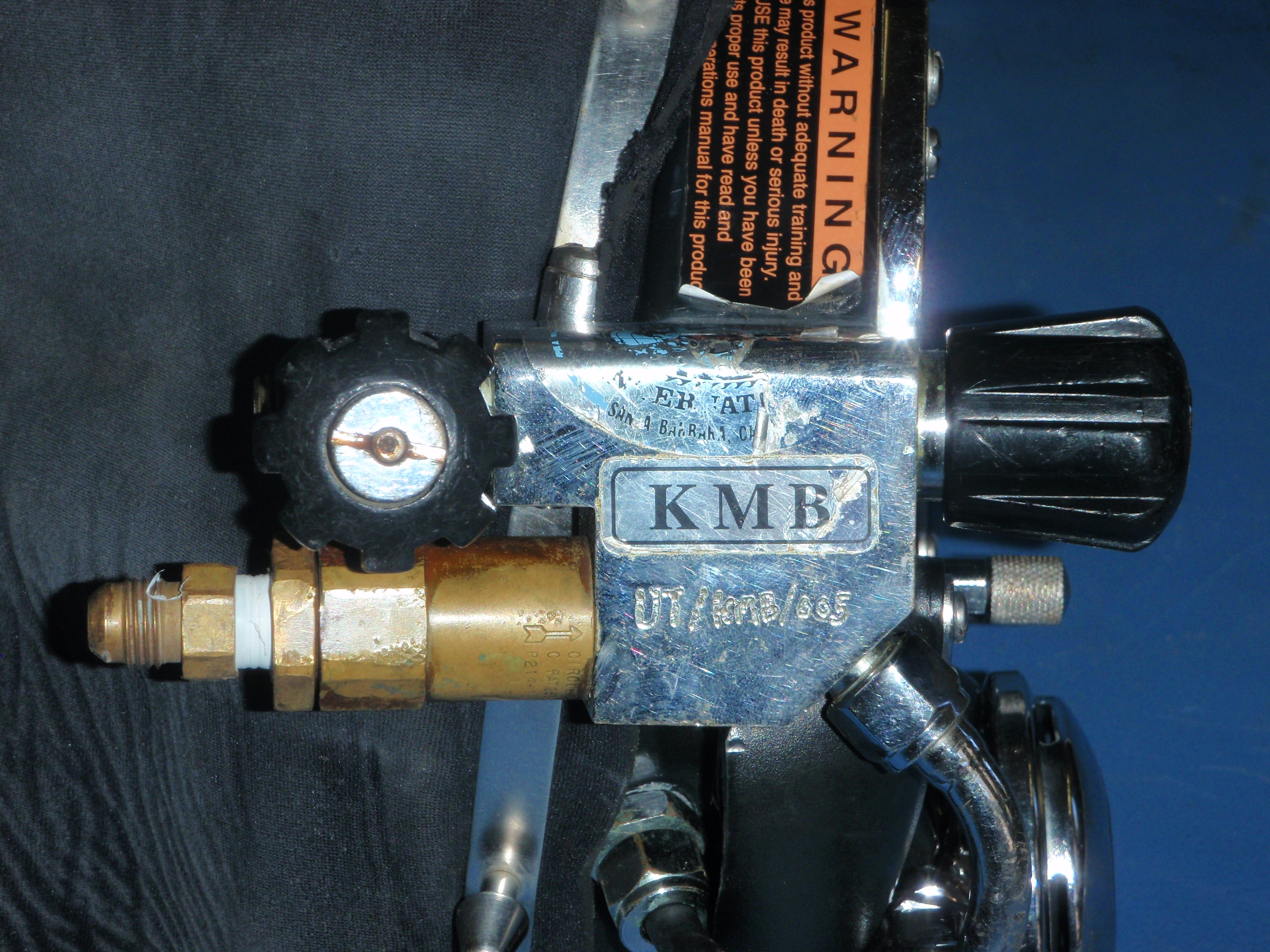
The bailout block on a KM18 band mask, showing the bailout valve knob (upper left), the non-return valve for main air supply (lower left), and the free-flow valve knob (right)

The bailout block is a small valved manifold, fitted either to the harness, where it is in a convenient but protected position, commonly on the right side on the waist strap, or on the helmet, at the temple, also usually on the right side. A helmet bailout block has the bailout valve knob to the side to distinguish it from the free-flow, or defogging valve, which is commonly to the front of the same manifold. The bailout block has a connection for the main gas supply hose from the umbilical through a non-return valve, which prevents backflow from the helmet if the hose is damaged. This main surface supply normally cannot be closed at the diver, and supplies the helmet demand valve and free flow valve from the bailout block under normal circumstances. The bailout gas supply hose is connected at the bailout valve, which is normally closed, and is opened manually by he diver to admit bailout gas to the regulator. If the bailout gas is intended to override surface supply, so that the diver can switch if they detect a problem with surface supply quality without input from the gas panel operator, the emergency gas supply must be at a higher pressure than the umbilical gas supply, while the diver is inhaling, or the bailout valve must also shut off surface supply.

==== Bailout regulator ====
The emergency breathing gas from the bailout cylinder passes through a conventional scuba first stage regulator at the cylinder valve, via a low-pressure hose, to the bailout block, where it is normally isolated by the bailout valve. When the diver needs to switch over to bailout gas they simply open the bailout valve and the gas is supplied to the helmet or mask. As the valve is normally closed, a leak in the first stage regulator seat will cause the interstage pressure to rise, and unless an overpressure relief valve is fitted to the first stage the hose may burst. Aftermarket overpressure valves are available which can be fitted into a standard low-pressure port of most first stages.

If the interstage pressure for the bailout regulator is lower than the main supply pressure, the main supply will override the bailout gas, and continue to flow. This can be a problem if the diver switches to bailout because the main supply is contaminated. If, on the other hand, bailout pressure is higher than main supply pressure, the bailout gas will override the main gas supply if the valve is opened. This will result in the bailout gas being used up if the valve leaks. The diver should periodically check that bailout cylinder pressure is still sufficient for the rest of the dive, and abort the dive if it is not. For this reason the bailout regulator must be fitted with a submersible pressure gauge to which the diver can refer to check the pressure. This is usually clipped off or tucked into the harness on the left side, where it can be easily reached to read, but is unlikely to snag on anything.

== Diver's harness ==
The diver's harness is an item of strong webbing, and sometimes cloth, which is fastened around a diver over the exposure suit, and allows the diver to be lifted without risk of falling out of the harness. Several types are in use.

=== Jacket harness ===
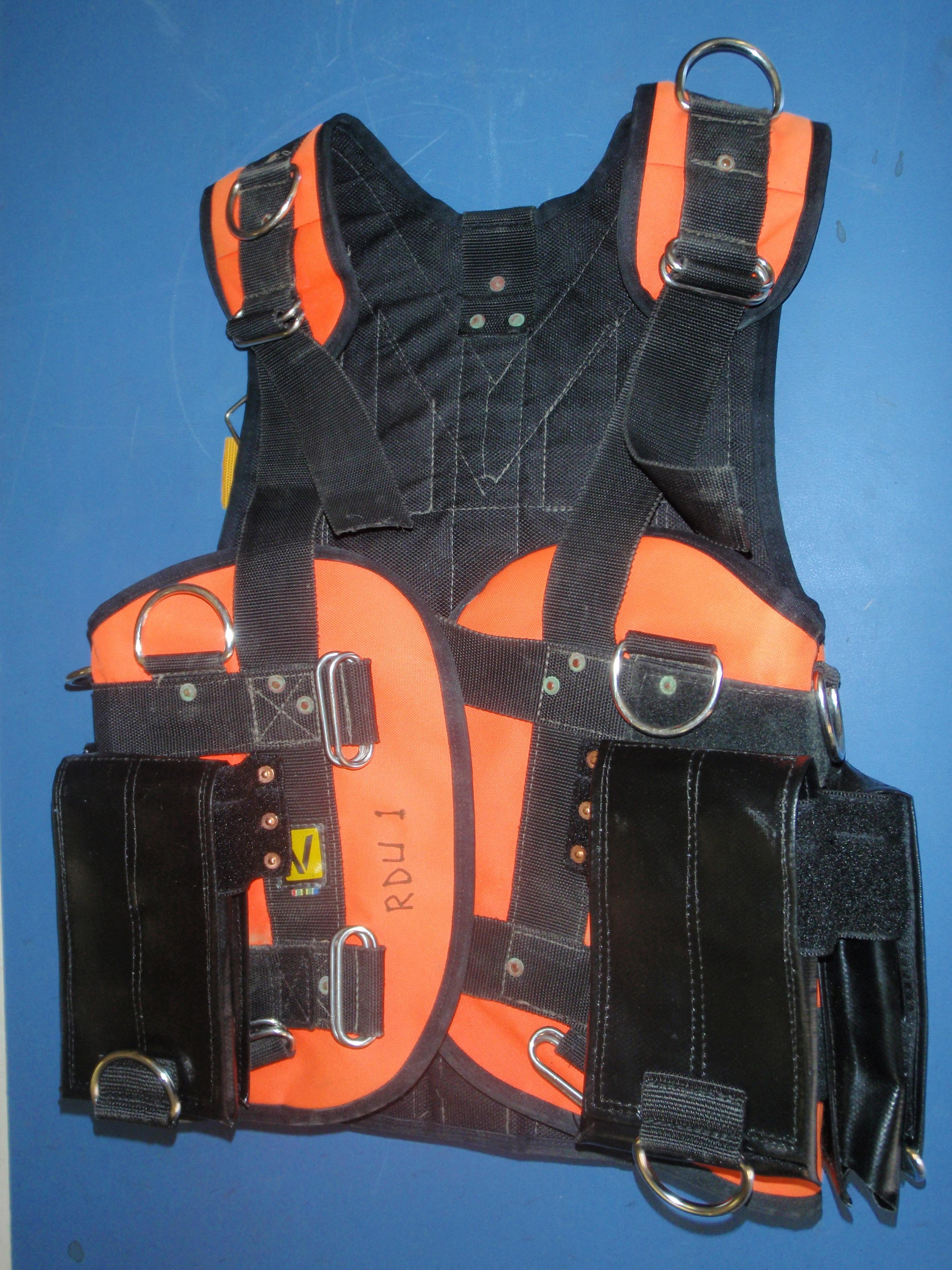
Front view of jacket style diver harness with removable weight pockets

The jacket harness, also known as AR vest, is a waistcoat (vest) style garment with strong adjustable webbing straps which are adjustable and securely buckled over the shoulders, across the chest and waist, and through the crotch or around each thigh, so that the diver can not slide out under any predictable circumstance. The harness is fitted with several heavy duty D-rings, fixed to the webbing in such a way that the full weight of the diver and all their equipment can be safely supported. A minimum strength for a safe working load of 500 kgf is recommended or required by some codes of practice. A jacket harness is usually provided with webbing straps or a cloth pocket on the back to support the bailout cylinder, may have a variety of pockets to carry tools, and may also carry ditchable or fixed main weights. There are usually several strong D-rings to secure the umbilical and other equipment.

=== Bell harness ===
A bell harness has the same function as a jacket harness, but lacks the cloth jacket component, and is made entirely of webbing, with a similar configuration of straps. It too may have a means of carrying a bailout cylinder, or the bailout cylinder may be carried on a separate backpack.

=== Harness with buoyancy compensation ===
The AP Valves Mk4 Jump Jacket is a harness with integral buoyancy jacket specifically designed for commercial diving work with helmets and bells. There is a direct feed to the jacket from the main air supply, via the helmet side-manifold block, from the pneumo line and from bailout, and a system which allows the diver's pneumo to be directly connected to another diver's helmet as an emergency air supply. The harness supports a single or twin cylinder bailout set, allows buoyancy control from slightly negative through neutral, to sightly positive, and has a safety harness for retaining the helmet.The Jump Jacket also serves as a recovery harness for rescues to the bell, and has front and back lifting points.

=== Buoyancy control ===
Surface-supplied divers may be required to work in mid-water or on the bottom. They must be able to stay down without effort, and this usually requires weighting. When working in mid-water the diver may wish to be neutrally buoyant or negative, and when working on the bottom, will usually want to be several kilograms negative. The only time the diver may want to be positively buoyant is when on the surface or during a limited range of emergencies where uncontrolled ascent is less life-threatening than remaining under water. Surface-supplied divers generally have a secure supply of breathing gas, and there are very few occasions where weights should be jettisoned, so in most cases the surface-supplied diver weighting arrangement does not provide for quick release.

On those occasions when surface supplied divers need variable buoyancy, it may be provided by inflation of the dry suit, if used, or by a buoyancy control device similar in principle to those used by scuba divers, or both.

== Weight systems ==
The diver needs to stay on the bottom to work some of the time, and may need to have neutral buoyancy some of the time. The diving suit is usually buoyant, so added weight is usually necessary. This can be provided in several ways. Unwanted positive buoyancy is dangerous to a diver who may need to spend significant time decompressing during the ascent, so the weights are usually attached securely to prevent accidental loss.

=== Weight belts ===
Weight belts for surface supplied diving are usually provided with buckles which can not accidentally be released, and the weight belt is often worn under the jacket harness.

=== Weight harnesses ===
When large amounts of weight are needed, a harness may be used to carry the load on the diver's shoulders, rather than around the waist, where it may tend to slip down into an uncomfortable position if the diver is working in a vertical posture, which is often the case. Sometimes this is a separate harness, worn under the safety harness, with pockets at the sides to carry the weights, and sometimes it is an integrated system, which carries the weight in pockets built into or externally attached to the safety harness. On the standard diving suit, the load of the weighting system was usually at least partly transferred to the corselet of the copper helmet, to directly counteract the helmet's buoyancy.

=== Trim weights ===
If the diver needs to adjust trim for greater comfort and efficiency while working, trim weights of various types may be added to the harness.

=== Weighted boots ===
Weighted boots of several styles may be used if the diver will be working heavy. Some are in the form of clogs which strap on over the boots, and others use lead inner soles. Ankle weights are also an option, but less comfortable. These weights give the diver better stability when working upright on the bottom, which can significantly improve productivity for some kinds of work.

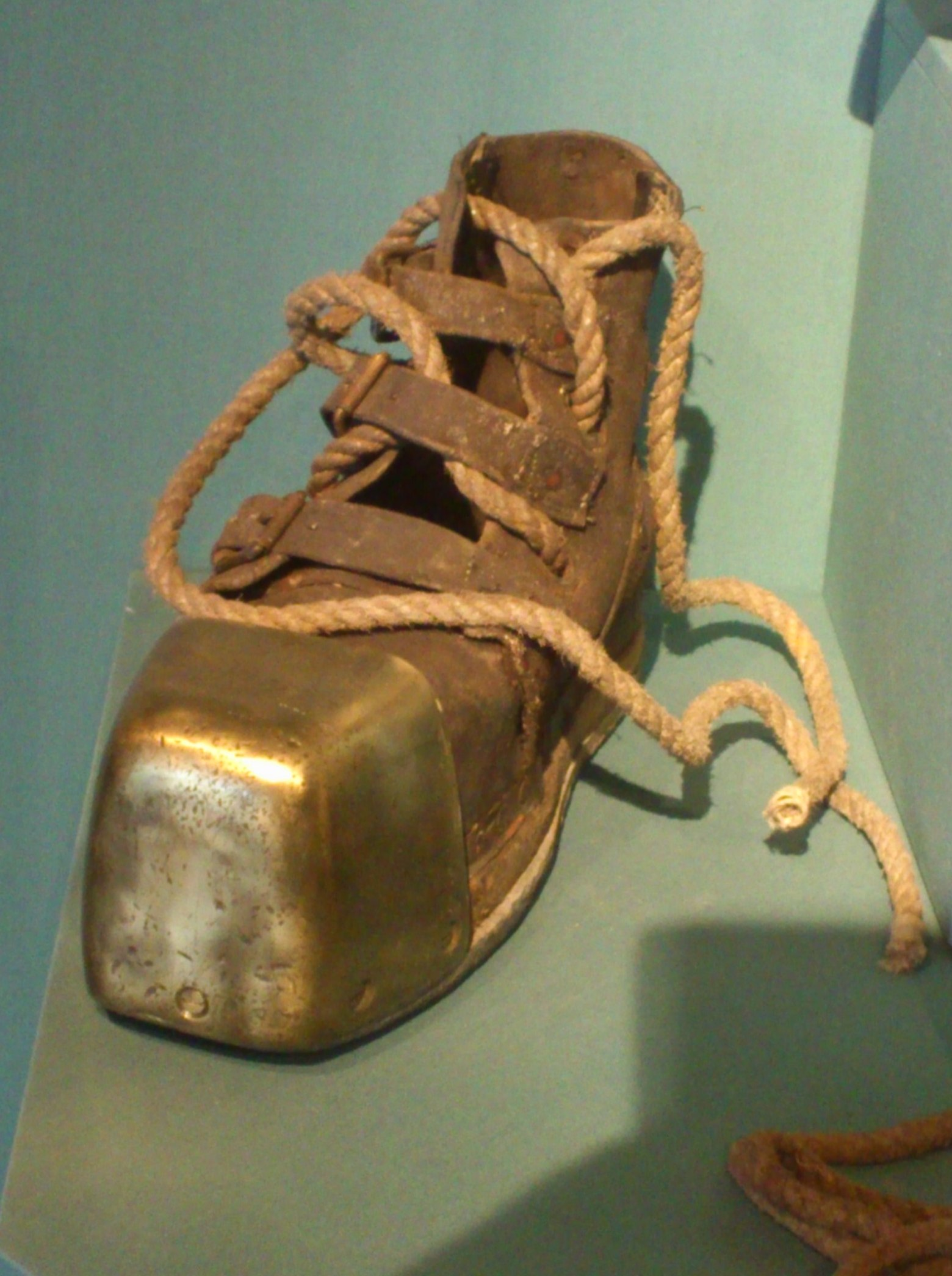
Diver's boot on display at the Aberdeen Maritime Museum

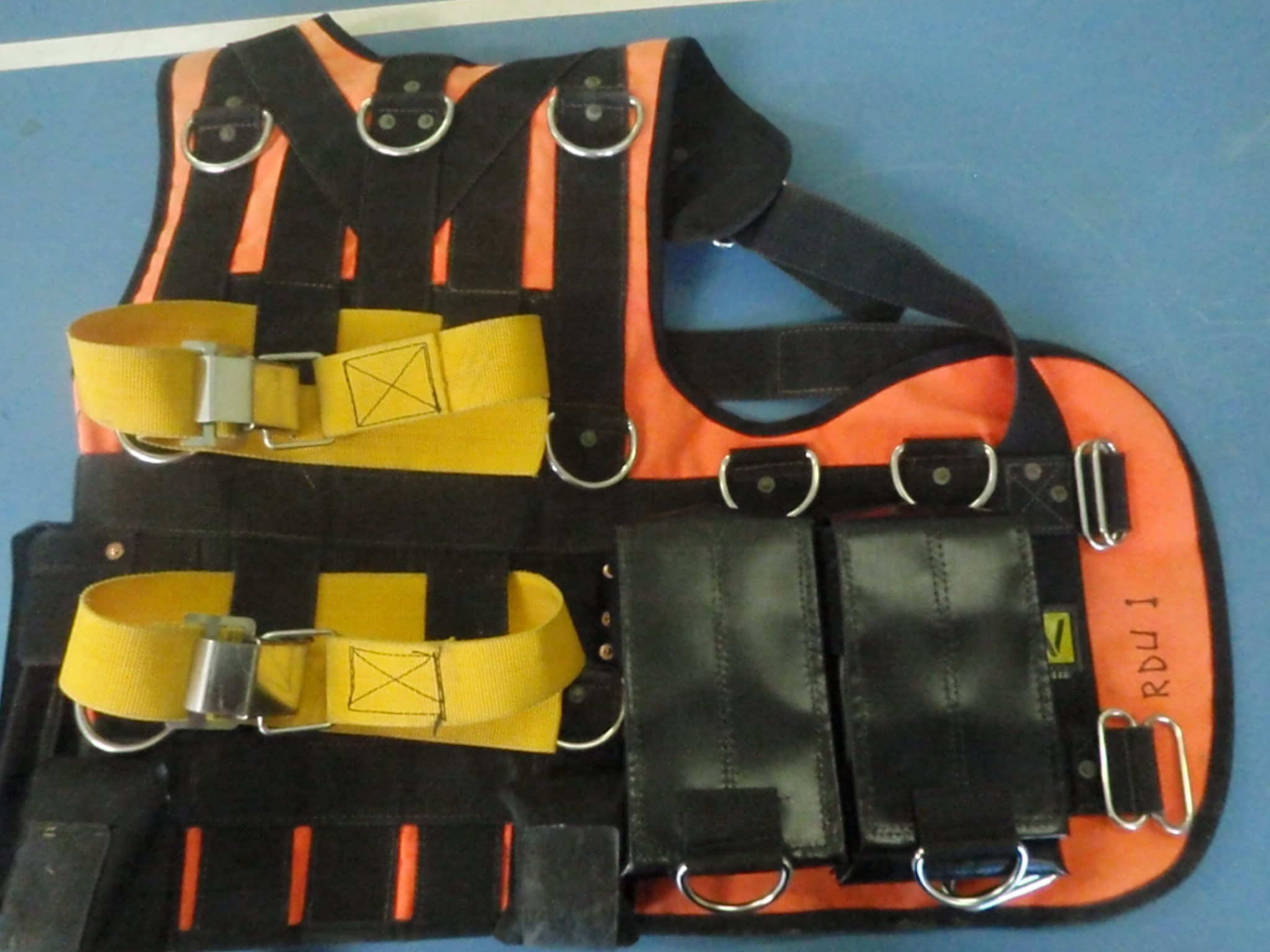
A diver's safety harness of the jacket type with removable weight pockets, showing the bailout cylinder straps and the webbing strength members with heavy duty D-rings

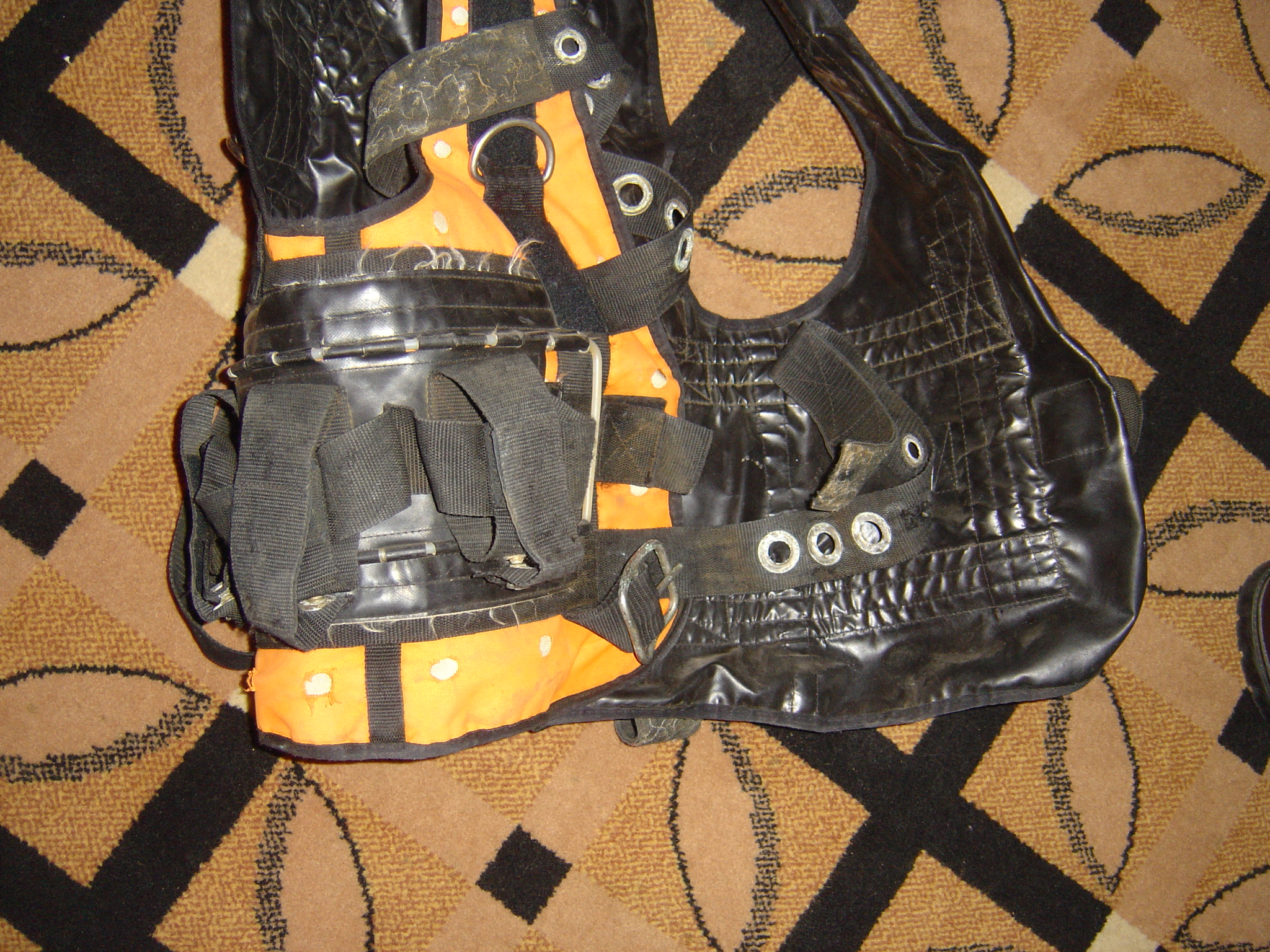
A jacket style diving safety harness with a different ditchable weight system on the side

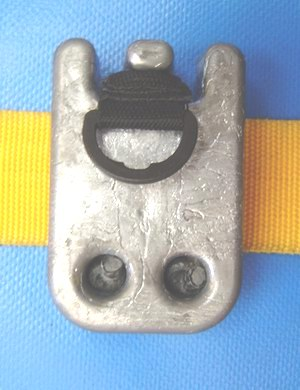
Clip on trim weights may be attached to the harness webbing to adjust the position of centre of gravity to improve trim

== Environmental protection ==
Wetsuits are economical and used where the water temperature is not too low - more than about 65 °F (18 °C), the diver will not be spending too long in the water, and the water is reasonably clean.

Dry suits are better thermal protection than most wetsuits, and isolate the diver from the environment more effectively than other exposure suits. When diving in contaminated water, a drysuit with integral boots, sealed dry gloves and a helmet sealed directly to the suit provides the best environmental isolation. The suit material must be selected to be compatible with the expected contaminants. Thermal undersuits can be matched to the expected water temperature.

Hot water suits provide active warming which is particularly suitable for use with helium based breathing gases. Heated water is provided from the surface through a hose in the umbilical, and water flow can be adjusted to suit the diver's needs. Heated water continuously flows into the suit and is distributed by perforated internal tubes down the front and back of the torso and along the limbs.

The hot water supply hose of the umbilical is commonly 1/2 inch (13 mm) bore, and is connected to a supply manifold at the right hip of the suit with a set of valves which allow the diver to control flow to the front and back of the torso, and to the arms and legs, and to dump the supply to the environment if the water is too hot or too cold. The manifold distributes the water through the suit through perforated tubes. The hot-water suit is normally a one-piece neoprene wetsuit, fairly loose fitting, to fit over a neoprene undersuit, which can protect the diver from scalding if the temperature control system fails, with a zipper on the front of the torso and on the lower part of each leg. Gloves and boots are worn which receive hot water from the ends of the arm and leg hoses. If a full-face mask is worn, the hood may be supplied by a tube at the neck of the suit. Helmets do not require heating. The heating water flows out at the neck and cuffs of the suit through the overlap with gloves, boots, or hood.

== Communications systems ==
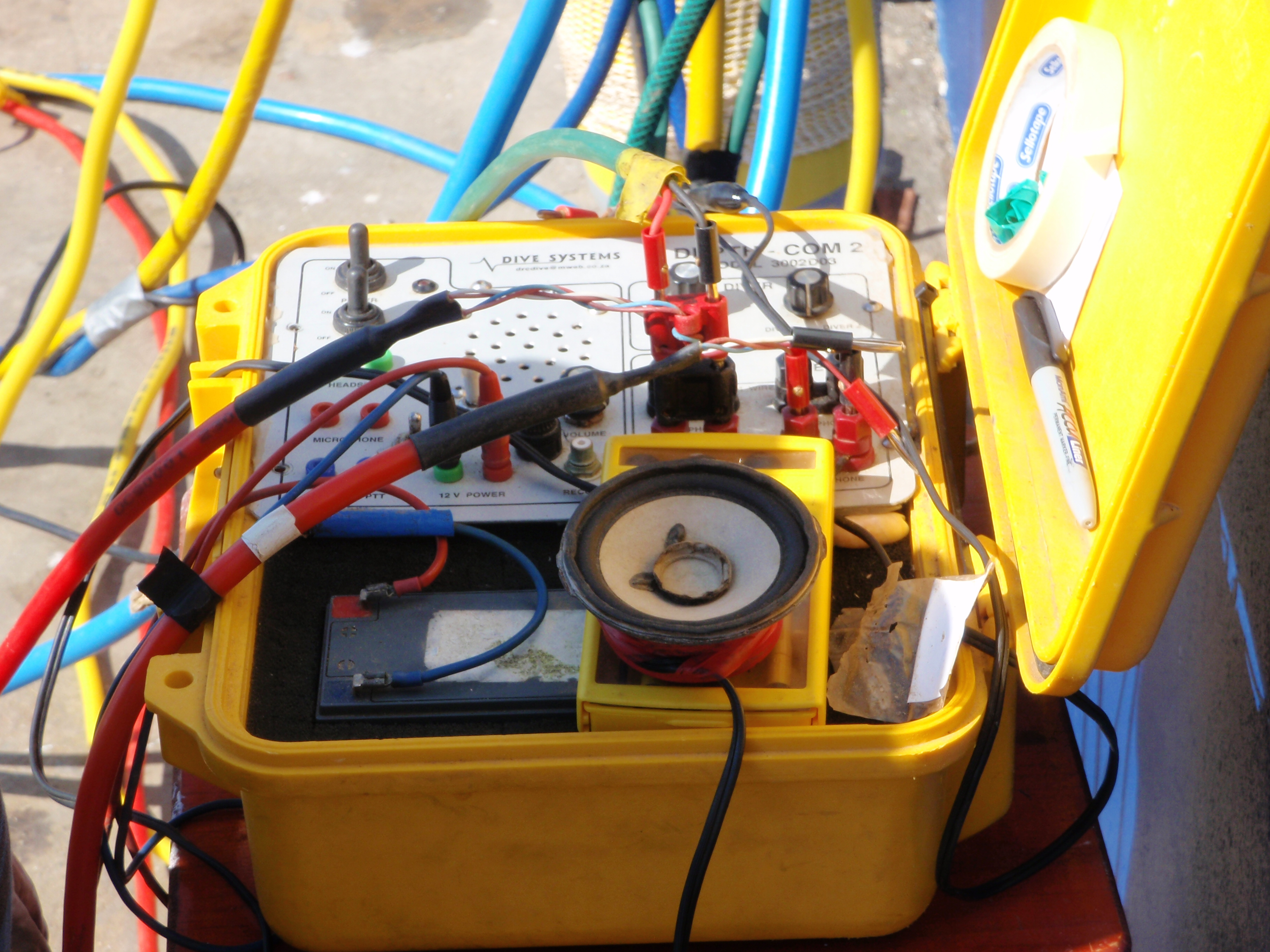
A hard-wired diver communications unit mounted in a waterproof box for convenience of transport and protection. The loose speaker has been added to increase output volume. there is a built in speaker behind the perforations on the panel

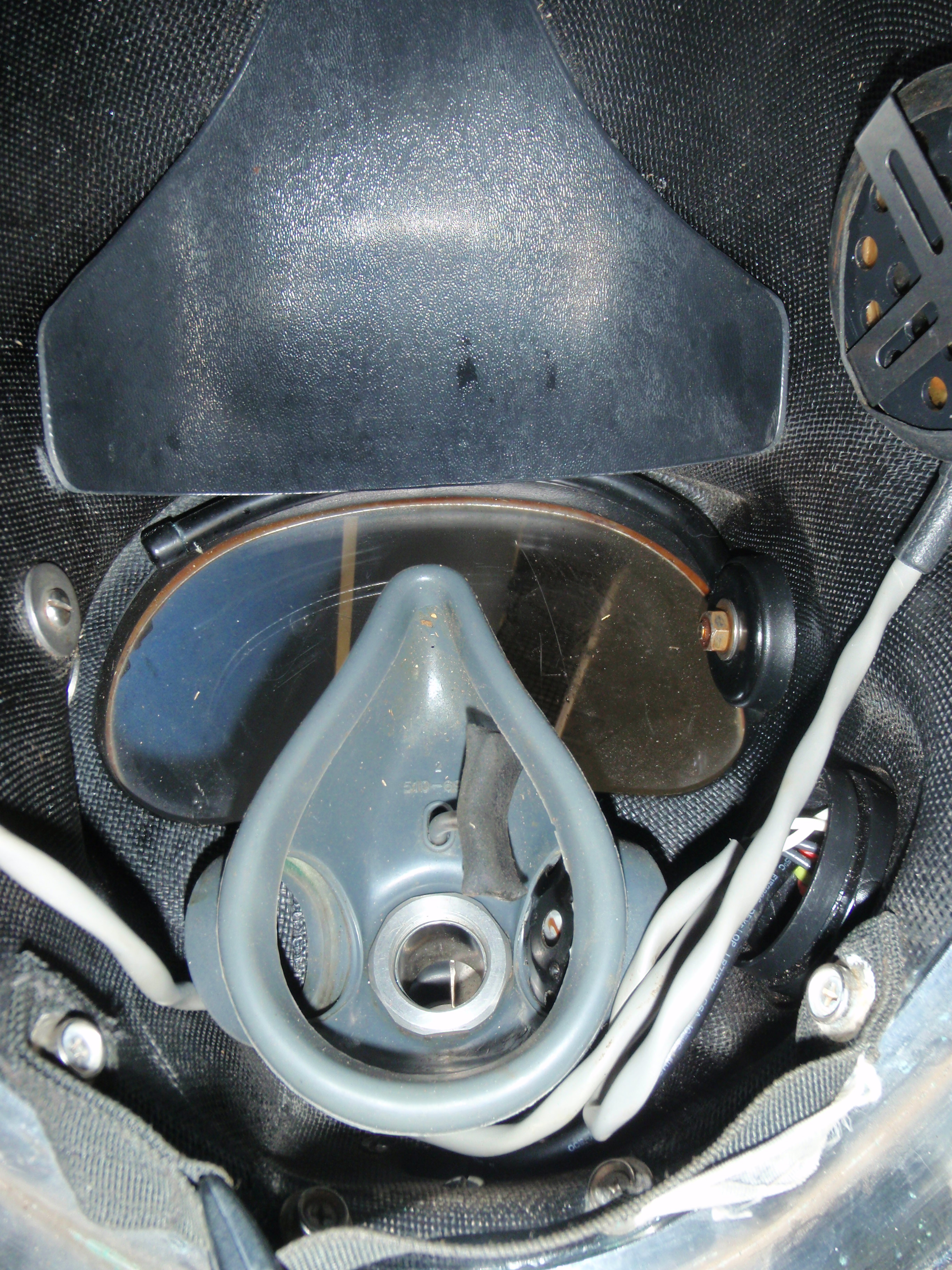
Inside a Kirby Morgan 37 helmet showing the microphone in the oro-nasal mask, and one of the speakers at the top of the photo

Both hard-wired (cable) and through-water electronic voice communications systems may be used with surface-supplied diving. Wired systems are more popular as there is a physical connection to the diver for gas supply in any case, and adding a cable does not change the handling characteristics of the system. Wired communications systems are more reliable and simpler to maintain than through-water systems.

=== Diver's telephone ===
The communications equipment is relatively straightforward and may be of the two-wire or four-wire type. Two wire systems use the same wires for surface to diver and diver to surface messages, whereas four wire systems allow the diver's messages and the surface operator's messages to use separate wire pairs.

In a two wire system the standard arrangement for diver communications is to have the diver's side normally on, so that the surface team can hear anything from the diver at all times except when the surface is sending a message. In a four-wire system the diver's side is always on, even when the surface operator is talking. This is considered an important safety feature, as the surface team can monitor the diver's breathing sounds, which can give early warning of problems developing, and confirms that the diver is alive.

Heliox divers may need a decoder system (unscrambler) which reduces the frequency of the sound to make it more intelligible.

=== Video ===
Closed circuit video is also popular, as this allows the surface personnel to see what the diver is doing, which is particularly useful for inspection work, as a non-diving specialist can see the underwater equipment in real time and direct the diver to look at particular features of interest.

=== Wireless systems ===
Dry bells may have a through water communication system fitted as a backup. This is intended to provide communications in the event that the cable is damaged, or even if the bell is completely severed from the umbilical and deployment cables.

== Diving spread ==
The diving spread is a commercial diving term for the topside dive site infrastructure supporting the diving operations for a diving project. The diving contractor provides the diving and support equipment and sets it up on site, usually at a place provided for the purpose by the client, or on a diving support vessel. Two types of diving spread are in common use: Air spreads for surface oriented diving operations, where the divers are deployed from normal atmospheric pressure, and decompressed back to atmospheric pressure at the end of the dive, either in-water, or in a chamber for surface decompression, using compressed air as the primary breathing gas, and saturation spreads, where divers are deployed under pressure from the saturation accommodation via a closed diving bell to the underwater worksite, and returned under pressure in the bell to the saturation accommodation system, usually breathing a helium based gas mixture. At the end of their contract the divers are decompressed to surface pressure. The process of selecting, transporting, setting up and testing the equipment is the mobilisation stage of the project, and the demobilisation involves dismantling, transportation and return to storage of the spread components.

Surface oriented mixed gas diving spreads may also be used, but are less common, and are likely to be associated with projects which are too deep for air but require only a short working time at depth.

=== Air spread ===
An air spread will include the breathing air supply equipment, and often a deck decompression chamber. Where a chamber is present, facilities for hyperbaric oxygen treatment are usually required. If the planned decompression is to be long, a diving stage or bell and the associated handling equipment is likely to be included to allow better control of ascent rate and decompression depth. Equipment for in-water or surface decompression on oxygen (SurDO_{2}) may be available.

Equipment may be necessary to facilitate safe entry to and exit from the water, and may include extrication equipment in case the diver is injured. A basic offshore air diving spread will typically include a dive control unit with compressor and high pressure storage banks, a launch and recovery system with a wet bell, a deck decompression chamber and a hot water unit.

=== Saturation spread ===
A saturation spread will include the closed bell and launch and recovery system, saturation habitat, breathing gas supplies and services, all the life support and control equipment, dive equipment stores and workshops, and may also include power supplies and other equipment not directly involved in the diving. It does not include the diving platform as such, for example a DP vessel, or offshore drilling rig, on which the spread is established, or other services such as catering and accommodation for the topside personnel, which would usually be provided to the dive team.

== See also ==
- Diver's pump – Manually powered surface air supply for divers
- Diving bell – Chamber for transporting divers vertically through the water
- Diving chamber – Hyperbaric pressure vessel for human occupancy used in diving operations
- Saturation diving – Diving mode and decompression technique
- Snuba – Limited depth airline breathing apparatus towed by the diver
- Standard diving dress – Copper helmet with rubberised canvas diving suit and weighted boots
