= Blue Robotics Inc =

Blue Robotics
- Industry: Marine robotics
- Founded: 2014
- Founder: Rustom Jehangir
- Headquarters: Torrance, California, United States
- Key people: Rustom Jehangir (CEO)
- Website: bluerobotics.com

Blue Robotics Inc. is an American marine technology company headquartered in Torrance, California. The company manufactures underwater robotic vehicles and related components, including remotely operated underwater vehicles (ROVs), and develops open-source software for marine robotics.

== History ==
Blue Robotics was founded in 2014 by Rustom Jehangir, Joe Spadola and Josh Villibrant. The company initially developed underwater thrusters for marine robotics. In August 2014, it launched a Kickstarter campaign for its first product, the T100 Thruster, raising approximately $102,000. Manufacturing initially took place in Redondo Beach, California, before the company established operations in Torrance.

By October 2022, Blue Robotics had sold more than 70,000 thrusters and 3,200 BlueROV2 remotely operated vehicles, according to figures reported by Marine Technology Reporter.

In 2025, the company collaborated with the Ocean Discovery League on the development of the Deep Ocean Research and Imaging System (DORIS), a deep-sea imaging platform.

In November 2025, the company signed a 10-year lease for approximately 49,000 square feet at the AltaSea campus at the Port of Los Angeles in San Pedro. It announced plans to relocate its headquarters and manufacturing operations from Torrance, with the new facility expected to open in late 2026.

== Products and technology ==
Blue Robotics manufactures remotely operated underwater vehicles and uncrewed surface vessels. Its BlueROV2, introduced in 2016, is a remotely operated underwater vehicle used for underwater observation and inspection. The company also produces the BlueBoat, an uncrewed surface vessel used for surveying and environmental monitoring. Its other products include underwater thrusters, watertight enclosures, sonars, and sensors.

The company's equipment is used in marine research, underwater inspection and environmental monitoring. Its BlueROV2 was among the underwater vehicles tested by the Netherlands Organisation for Applied Scientific Research (TNO) during research into seaweed-farm monitoring.

== Recognition ==
In 2018, Blue Robotics founder Rustom Jehangir was named to the Forbes 30 Under 30 list in the Manufacturing & Industry category.
