= Épaulard =

French remotely operated underwater vehicle of the Ifremer

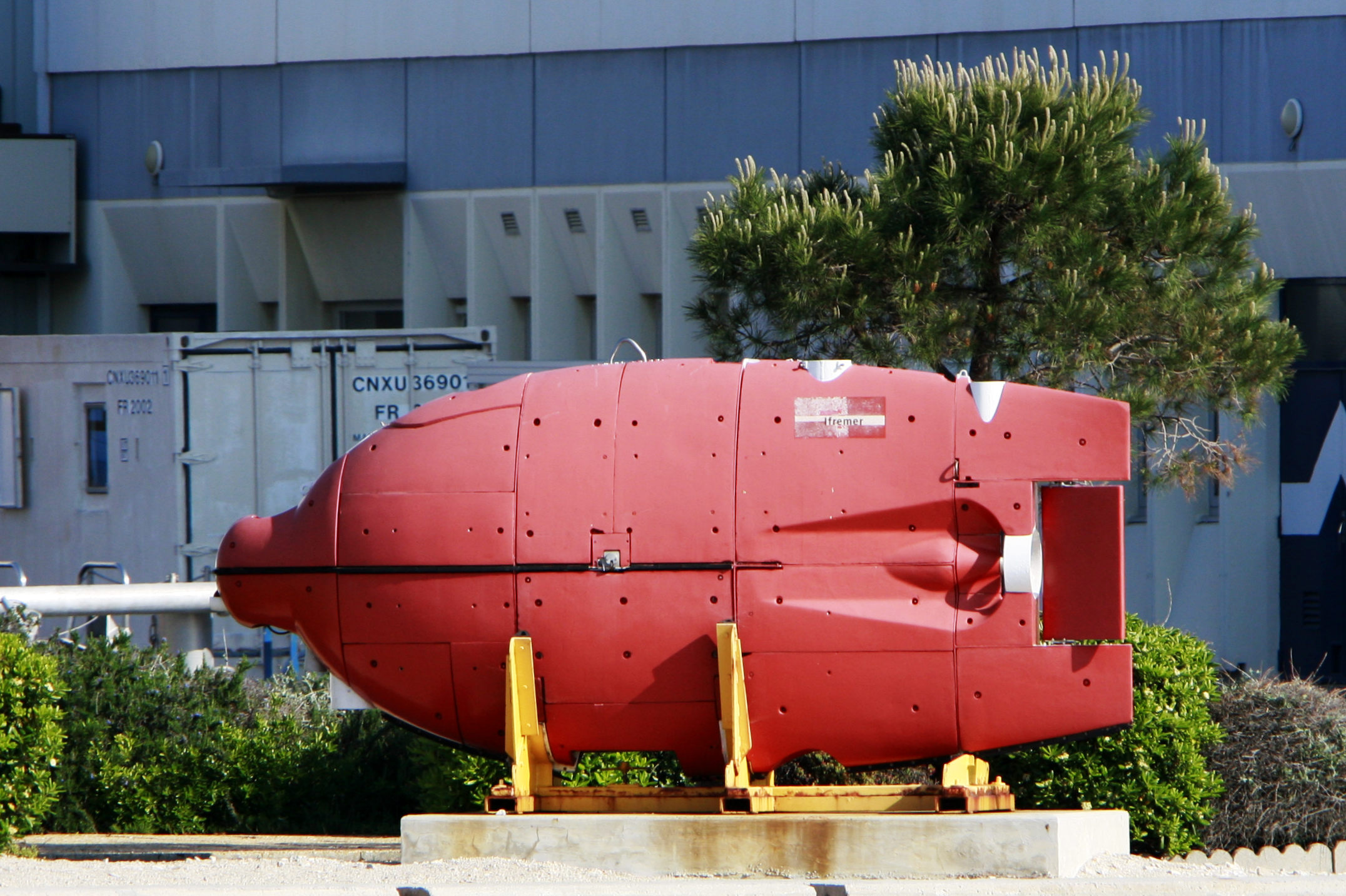
- Épaulard at La Seyne-sur-Mer

History

France
- Name: Épaulard
- Namesake: Killer whale
- Owner: Ifremer
- Builder: ECA Group
- Commissioned: 1980

General characteristics
- Class & type: remotely operated underwater vehicle
- Displacement: 3 tonnes
- Length: 4 metres
- Beam: 1.1 metres
- Height: 2 metres
- Depth: 6000 m
- Propulsion: Sail
- Speed: 1 m/s
- Range: 20 km
- Endurance: 7 to 12 hours
- Sensors & processing systems: 5000-shot BENTHOS 377 photographic camera
- Armour: Aluminum

Épaulard is a French remotely operated underwater vehicle of the Ifremer. She was the first robotic submarine capable of taking photographs at a depth of 6000 metres. Built in 1980, Épaulard was decommissioned in 1991.

== Design ==
Épaulard was designed and built by ECA Group She was teleoperated from a support ship by means of acoustic signals.

While the submarine herself displaced three tonnes, the entire system would use up 35m² of deck space and weight 20 tonnes; such systems were installed on a number of Ifremer ships such as Noroît, Suroît, Atalante or Jean Charcot.

== Upgrade ==
In 1983, she was upgraded with a vertical propeller and a remote TV system with acoustic broadcast of images.

== Career ==
Starting in 1981, Épaulard was used for the study of nodules and shipwrecks on the Pacific seafloor.

She was decommissioned in 1991, having performed 200 missions.

== See also ==
- BlueROV2
