= Atlantis ROV Team =

High-school underwater robotics team from Whidbey Island, Washington, United States

Atlantis ROV Team is a high-school underwater robotics team from Whidbey Island, Washington, United States competing in the MATE International ROV Competition. They are the 2013 Pacific Northwest Champions and are ranked 11th internationally.

Atlantis ROV Team was founded in September 2010 by a homeschool parent and consisted of five middle-school team members. They went on to place 4th overall in the 2011 MATE Pacific Northwest Regional Challenge.

In May 2012, the team competed again in the MATE Pacific Northwest Regional Challenge and placed 8th overall. They also won the Best Poster award. Due to the success of Atlantis ROV Team's poster, their Communications Director (and designer of the winning poster) was recruited by a Hawaiian high-school underwater robotics team and competed at Internationals in the summer of 2012. Her poster placed 2nd at tie-break.

In May 2013, Atlantis ROV Team won the MATE Pacific Northwest Regional Challenge, becoming the 2nd Whidbey Island underwater robotics team ever to do so. In early June 2013, they hosted two Signature Events for the Seattle Science Festival, which allowed youth and adults to gain hands-on practical experience building ROVs and to learn more about the principles and science behind such technology.

At the 12th annual MATE International ROV Competition, Atlantis ROV Team competed against teams from Scotland, Macau, Singapore, Canada, the United States, Egypt, and Hong Kong. They placed 11th overall under the school sponsorship of Columbia Virtual Academy, 7th in the Technical Paper division, and 3rd in the Poster division.

In November 2013, they were issued an honorary proclamation by the Island County Commissioners to acknowledge and congratulate them due to their achievements.
