= T1200 Trenching Unit =

Remotely operated seabed trenching unit

The T1200 was built in the United Kingdom by Forum Energy Technologies' Perry Slingsby Systems Remotely Operated Vehicle manufacturing brand. The T1200's design was based on a smaller version called the T750 but with 50 percent (1,125 hp) more power and the capacity to trench larger diameter products (up to 36 inches) to burial depths of 3 m (10 ft) depending on soil strength. The T1200 was completed in April 2012 and delivered to Helix Energy Solutions Group's ROV operations business unit Canyon Offshore in May 2012. In July 2012 the T1200 completed its first cable burial project at the Sheringham Shoal offshore wind farm in the North Sea. Its first oil and gas project was completed in October 2012 with the burial of a 14 km (8.7-mile) export pipeline in the North Sea.
