= Goldfish-class ROUV =

Light class of Chinese remotely operated underwater vehicle

The Goldfish class (金鱼, Jin Yu, or JY for short) remotely operated underwater vehicle (ROUV) is a class of light ROUV developed by the Shenyang Institute of Automation (SIA, 沈阳自动化研究所) of the Chinese Academy of Sciences. It is in service with both the People's Liberation Army Navy (PLAN) and other civilian agencies of the People's Republic of China.

Three models of the Goldfish class ROUV have been developed as of late 2009: JY-01 (Jin Yu Yi Hao, 金鱼一号), the original base model of the class weighing 40 kg, capable of operating to a depth of 100 meters. JY-01 first entered service in 1987, first used in the underwater inspection of Fengman Dam. JY-01 was a development of American RCV-225 ROUV developed in early 1980s, after China made a deal with US firm for technology transfer.

It was JY-02 (Jin Yu Er Hao, 金鱼二号), the successor to JY-01; and JY-03 (Jin Yu San Hao, 金鱼三号) that entered service in 1989. The Goldfish class ROUV is designed to be a man-portable system that can be rapidly deployed without the need for extensive ship-borne or shore-based logistic support. JY-02 weighs 36 kg and is a meter in height; its successor, JY-03 is more compact. Like it predecessor JY-1, JY-2 has also being used in the underwater inspection of Fengman Dam, and the dam authority subsequently purchased JY-02. The entire system weight of JY-03 is less than 100 kg, while the largest subsystem, the underwater vehicle, weighs less than 35 kg. This means that JY-03 can be carried and deployed by two adults without difficulty. JY-02 has earned a second place of Liaoning provincial Science and Technology Advancement Award in 1989.

Goldfish class ROUV is a class of ROUV designed for underwater observation, and is used to inspect the underwater structures of harbors. During its deployment, it often operates in conjunction with more advanced ROUVs, and serves as a search vehicle to gather information. Goldfish class ROUVs can more cheaply inspect large areas than is possible with higher-spec ROUVs; these more capable ROUVs then use data gathered by the Goldfish class to perform maintenance tasks on specific areas. Goldfish class ROUVs also have civilian applications, including for underwater archeology missions in Fuxian Lake. Media coverage of the Fuxian Lake project revealed the existence of the Goldfish class ROUV to the general public for the first time.

Goldfish series ROUV are primarily intended for deployment in lakes, rivers and inside harbors, and based on the experience gained from this series, SIA has also developed Sea Submergence (Hai-Qian, 海潜 in Chinese) series that can be deployed in coastal waters. As with Goldfish series, Sea Submergence series is also light ROUV, and a total of 2 models are in this series, Sea Submergence 1 (海潜一号 in Chinese), an observation/inspection version, and Sea Submergence 2 (海潜二号 in Chinese), which is capable of performing maintenance tasks in addition to observation and inspection. Sea Submergence 1 has won Chinese Academy of Sciences Science and Technology Advancement Award in 1993.
