= Mini Rover ROV =

Small, low cost observation class remotely operated underwater vehicle

Mini Rover ROV Credit: Chris Nicholson

The Mini Rover ROV was the world's first small, low cost remotely operated underwater vehicle (ROV) when it was introduced in early 1983. After a demonstration to industry professionals, in the Spring of 1984, it made a significant entry to the remotely operated vehicle market. It is a self-propelled, tethered, free swimming vehicle that was designed and built by Chris Nicholson of Deep Sea Systems International, Inc. (DSSI). The Mini Rover ROV entered the ROV market at a price of $26,850 when the next lowest cost ROV was $100,000. Nicholson built the first Mini Rover ROV in his garage in Falmouth, MA. It was 26 inches long and weighed 55 pounds. It could be carried on airplanes as luggage.

The Mini Rover ROV has been involved in many undersea expeditions including the 1989 3D filming of the SS Edmund Fitzgerald and the 1989 and 1990 Pearl Harbor Project with the National Park Service and National Geographic to survey the USS Arizona Memorial.

In the 1989 James Cameron film, The Abyss, the Mini Rover MKII ROV is credited as "Little Geek".

The size and portability of the Mini Rover ROV made it easily deployable for emergency situations anywhere in the world. On November 2, 1999, a Mini Rover ROV was on board the USNS Mohawk (T-ATF-170) at the scene of the October 31, 1999, EgyptAir Flight 990 crash site to be used to identify target locations.

Benthos, Inc. (Teledyne Benthos) acquired exclusive designs, trademarks, marketing and manufacturing rights for the Mini Rover ROV from DSSI in 1987. Benthos had been manufacturing and servicing the Mini Rover ROV for DSSI since 1984.
