= Seabed tractor =

Special purpose class of remotely operated underwater vehicle

A seabed tractor is a type of remotely operated underwater vehicle. They can be used for submarine cable laying or burial of cables or pipelines. This type of vehicle consists of a tracked crawler excavator device, configured for the task. It is controlled from the vessel by an umbilical cable. Operating seabed tractors is similar to operating other remotely operated vehicles. The seabed tractor operator drives the unit as if on board, using cameras on the unit for visual feedback, and other instrumentation.

== Operation ==
A typical operation involves lowering the seabed tractor onto the seabed over the pipeline when the location has been confirmed. The weight of the tractor remains mostly on the gantry, being controlled by heave-compensation gear on the gantry so that only about 40 tonnes of the weight rests on the seabed. The position reference of the vessel is then transferred to the trim-cube sensors on the seabed tractor support wires, which should remain vertical. The position of the vessel is controlled by the movements of the tractor, with the trim¬cube sensors feeding back wire angle data to the dynamic positioning (DP) system which corrects the position of the vessel to keep the tractor wires vertical. The DP system would be configured with the centre of rotation located on the trencher. Heading can thus be adjusted according to the environment or any other constraints.

When laying a cable, the cable itself is a hazard as it can get caught on the umbilical cable. Seabed tractors are usually somewhat slower and less agile than other ROUVs. They can be used together with another remotely operated underwater vehicle to enhance the overview and to survey the progress and performance.
