= Global Explorer ROV =

Deep water science and survey remotely operated vehicle

Global Explorer ROV

Global Explorer ROV is a unique deep water remotely operated vehicle that has made numerous dives below 9,000 feet (2,700 m) on science and survey expeditions for National Geographic, the National Oceanographic and Atmospheric Administration (NOAA) and other research organizations. It was designed and built by Chris Nicholson of Deep Sea Systems International, Inc. of Falmouth, Massachusetts.

== Expeditions ==
=== 2001 Loch Ness Science Survey ===
Dr. Robert Rines organized an expedition to search for the Loch Ness Monster using the Global Explorer ROV to obtain underwater images. The search did not find the Monster but did photograph an image on the bottom that looked like a large dead animal.

=== 2002 Arctic Ocean ===
On the NOAA's Arctic Exploration 2002, Global Explorer ROV dove to the bottom of the Canada Basin and collected live specimens down through the water column. The ROV also obtained digital still photographs and video of sea life. This was the first ever census of marine life throughout the entire water column from the surface of the ice to the seafloor.

=== 2003 Loch Ness Science Survey ===
Dr. Robert Rines worked to find the Loch Ness Monster on a second expedition with the Global Explorer ROV. This mission also ended without any success finding the Monster.

=== 2005 Arctic Ocean ===
Global Explorer ROV was the key tool used on the NOAA's Hidden Ocean Arctic 2005 expedition. Live specimens were obtained down to 9,000 feet and high definition video and still images.

=== 2007 USS Grunion ===
In August, 2007, Global Explorer ROV was instrumental in locating the submarine USS Grunion, which, with 70 men on board, disappeared during World War II and had been listed by the US Navy as "missing in action, cause unknown". The expedition to locate the submarine was financed and arranged by the family of the commander of USS Grunion, Lieutenant Commander Mannert L. Abele.

=== 2007 Celebes Sea ===
In September and October 2007, Global Explorer ROV joined NOAA and National Geographic on an expedition to the unexplored depths of the Celebes Sea, south of the Philippine Islands. The ROV was equipped with a high definition (HD) color video camera, a digital still camera, a 12-chambered suction sampler, and static canister samplers.

The Global Explorer ROV was the star of the expedition. In strong currents, it collected live specimens as well as photographs and video of unusual and unfamiliar specimens.

== Notes ==
=== References ===
- Caba, Jerry (June 30, 2005). "Arctic ROV Operations". Ocean Explorer. National Oceanographic and Atmospheric Administration.
- France, Scott C. (March 13–31, 2009). "Deep-water Connections: Probing the Southern Limits of Distribution of North Atlantic Deep-Sea Coral Communities". Ocean Explorer. National Oceanographic and Atmospheric Administration.
- Holland, Jennifer Steinberg (January 2004). "Northern Exposer". Online Extra. National Geographic. Archived from the original on January 16, 2010.
- Madin, Larry (October 15, 2007). "Exploring the Inner Space of the Celebes Sea 2007". Ocean Explorer. National Oceanographic and Atmospheric Administration.
- Reilly, Gerald (October 2008). "The Search for the USS Grunion and 70 Men on Eternal Patrol". Sea Technology. Archived from the original on September 5, 2010.
