= BlueROV2 =

Remotely operated underwater vehicle

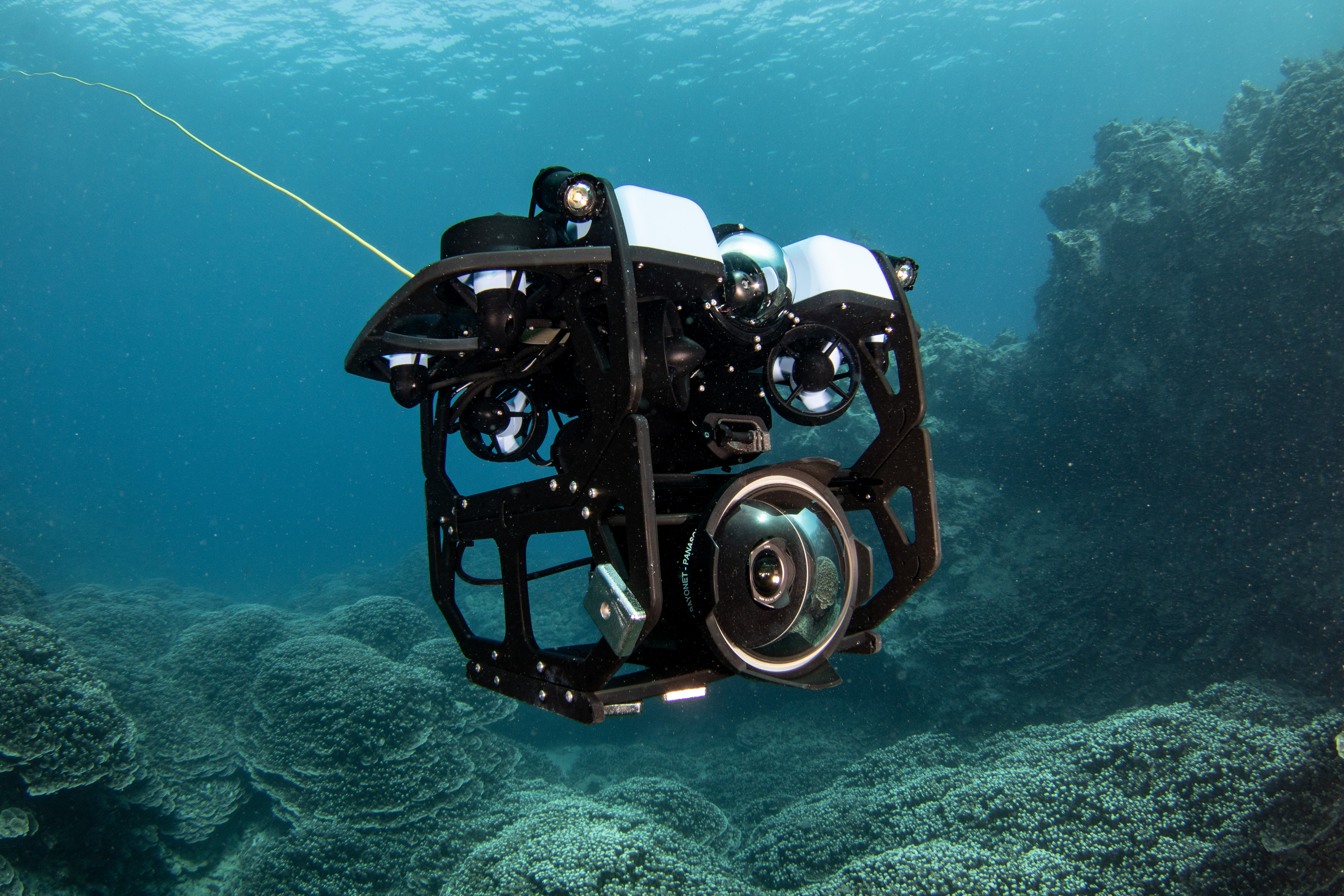
- BlueROV2 operating with ArduSub control software

Class overview
- Name: BlueROV2
- Builders: Blue Robotics
- Built: 2016

General characteristics
- Type: Remotely operated underwater vehicle (ROV)
- Displacement: 12 kg (26 lb)
- Length: 45 cm (18 in)
- Depth: Up to 100 m (330 ft) (standard); up to 300 m (980 ft) (extended)
- Installed power: Lithium-ion battery
- Propulsion: Six or eight thrusters (vectored configuration)
- Notes: Tethered control via surface computer/tablet

BlueROV2 is a modular remotely operated underwater vehicle (ROV) developed by the American marine robotics company Blue Robotics. It was released in 2016 as a low-cost platform with open-source control software for underwater research, inspection, and educational applications.

BlueROV2 has been used as an open-source platform in academic marine robotics research and has been described, alongside OpenROV, as part of a shift toward lower-cost underwater vehicles for researchers, small organizations, and hobbyists.

== Design and architecture ==
BlueROV2 is built around a modular frame that supports integration of cameras, sonar, robotic grippers, and additional scientific instruments.

The vehicle is configured with six thrusters to enable maneuvering in all directions. It is controlled via a tether connected to a surface computer or tablet running open-source control software.

The onboard electronics are based on a Raspberry Pi, which serves as the main controller and is typically connected to a front-facing camera, with support for additional sensors such as an inertial measurement unit (IMU).

== Applications ==
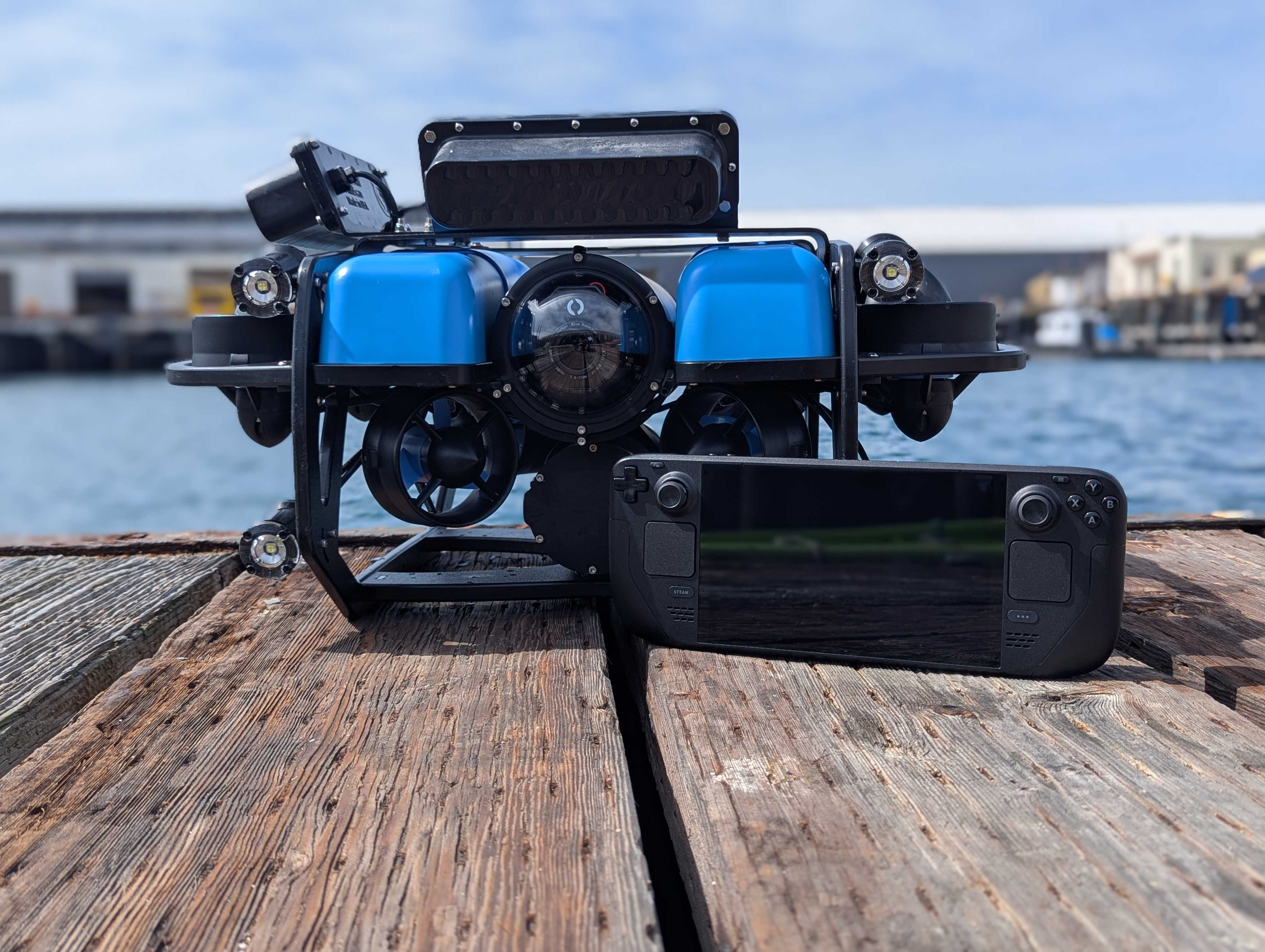
BlueROV2 and Steam Deck

=== Academic research ===
In 2020–2025, the platform has been used in academic research to develop low-cost autonomous underwater systems, including open-source hardware and software extensions for vision-based SLAM, dynamic simulation models, and experimental benchmarking of machine-learning methods for vision-based position locking in real-world underwater environments.

The BlueROV2 has also been adopted in marine science and underwater archaeology, where it is used for underwater observation, documentation, and environmental data collection.

=== Industrial use ===
BlueROV2 has been used in aquaculture and offshore infrastructure inspection, including the monitoring of shellfish beds, fish stocks, anchors, and subsea installations. It has also been employed in the development and testing of autonomous navigation and sensor-fusion systems for small underwater vehicles.

== See also ==
- Remotely operated underwater vehicle
- Autonomous underwater vehicle
