= Index of underwater diving: D–E =

Alphabetical listing of underwater diving related topics

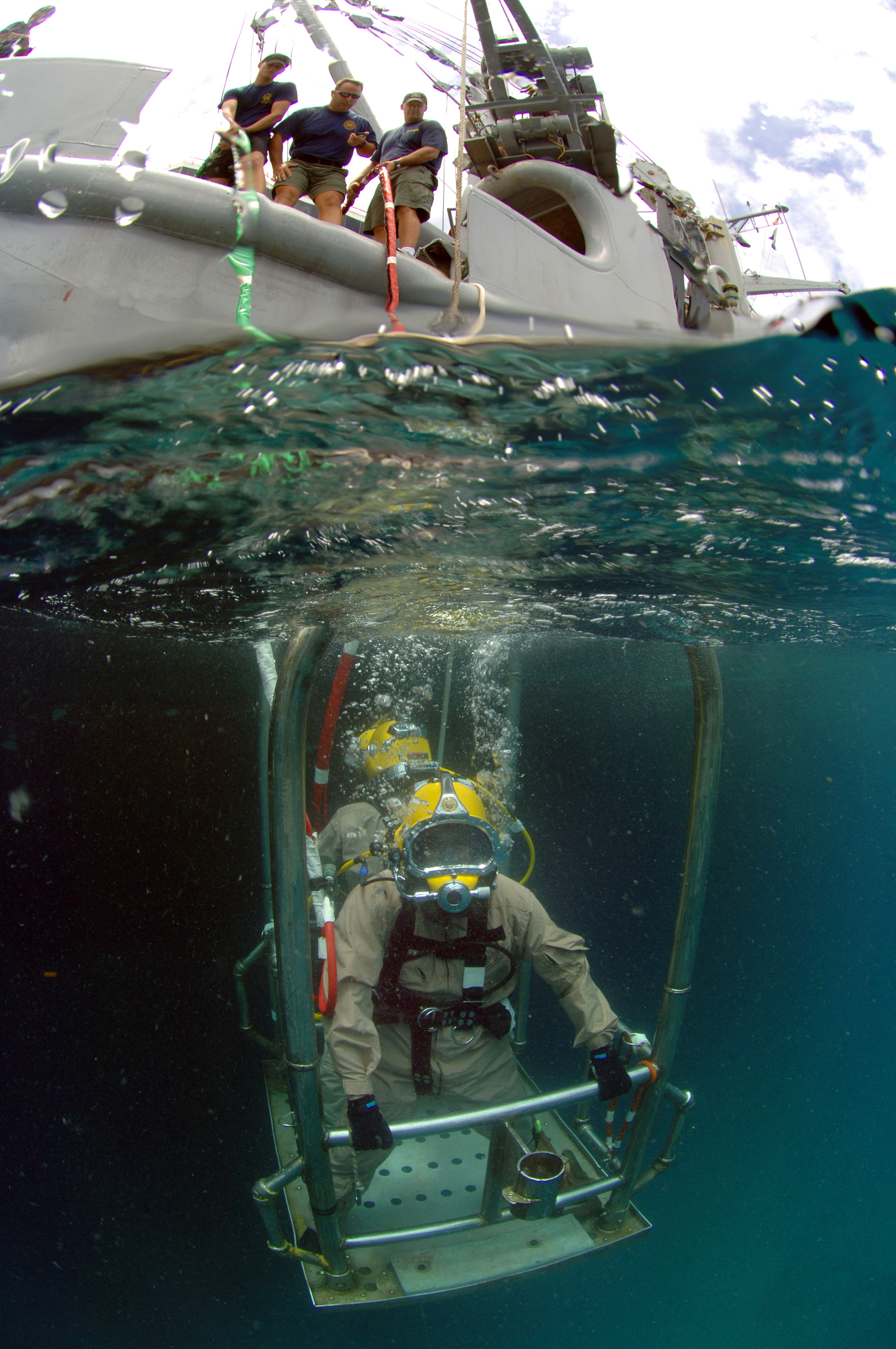
Surface-supplied divers riding a stage to the underwater workplace

The following index is provided as an overview of and topical guide to underwater diving: Links to articles and redirects to sections of articles which provide information on each topic are listed with a short description of the topic. When there is more than one article with information on a topic, the most relevant is usually listed, and it may be cross-linked to further information from the linked page or section.

Underwater diving can be described as all of the following:

- A human activity – intentional, purposive, conscious and subjectively meaningful sequence of actions. Underwater diving is practiced as part of an occupation, or for recreation, where the practitioner submerges below the surface of the water or other liquid for a period which may range between seconds to order of a day at a time, either exposed to the ambient pressure or isolated by a pressure resistant suit, to interact with the underwater environment for pleasure, competitive sport, or as a means to reach a work site for profit or in the pursuit of knowledge, and may use no equipment at all, or a wide range of equipment which may include breathing apparatus, environmental protective clothing, aids to vision, communication, propulsion, maneuverability, buoyancy control and safety equipment, and tools for the task at hand.

There are seven sub-indexes, listed here. The tables of content should link between them automatically:

- Index of underwater diving: A–C
- Index of underwater diving: D–E
- Index of underwater diving: F–K
- Index of underwater diving: L–N
- Index of underwater diving: O–R
- Index of underwater diving: S
- Index of underwater diving: T–Z

== D ==
Contents: Top	0–9	A	B	C	D	E	F	G	H	I	J	K	L	M	N	O	P	Q	R	S	T	U	V	W	X	Y	Z

Section contents: Top of section, Da–Dd, De, Di, Do, Dr, Ds, Du–Dw, Dy

=== Da–Dd ===
- Dacor (scuba diving) – Former American diving equipment manufacturer
- Dalmine (cylinders) – Italian manufacturer of seamless steel gas cylinders
- Dalton's law – Empirical law of partial pressures
- Damant, Guybon Chesney Castell – English physiologist, diver, royal navy officer, and researcher
- DAN Asia-Pacific – Regional organisation of the Divers Alert Network
- DAN Brasil – Regional organisation of the Divers Alert Network
- DAN Europe – Regional organisation of the Divers Alert Network
- DAN Japan – Regional organisation of the Divers Alert Network
- DAN Southern Africa – Regional organisation of the Divers Alert Network
- DAN World – Organisation of the Divers Alert Network covering other regions
- The Darkness Beckons – History of UK cave diving by Martyn Farr
- Darwin's Arch – Rock arch near Darwin Island (collapsed 2021)
- Davis Submerged Escape Apparatus – Oxygen rebreather
- Davis, Robert – English inventor and manufacturer of underwater breathing apparatus
- Day boat (diving), also known as day dive boat – Diving excursion boat without overnight accommodation
- Day, John – First recorded death in a diving chamber
- D-BRUV – Downward looking baited remote underwater video
- DCIEM decompression tables – Decompression tables based on the Kidd-Stubbs model
- DDRC Healthcare

=== De ===
Section contents: Top of section, Da–Dd, De, Di, Do, Dr, Ds, Du–Dw, Dy

- Dead space (physiology) – Inhaled air volume not involved in gas exchange
- Deadspace (in breathing apparatus) – Inhaled air not part of gas exchange
- Deadweight anchor – Anchor that relies on weight and friction for holding
- Deane, Charles Anthony – Pioneering diving engineer and inventor of a surface supplied diving helmet
- Deane, John – Joint inventor of the diving helmet
- Decima Flottiglia MAS – Italian naval commando frogman unit of the Fascist era
- Deck decompression chamber – Hyperbaric chamber suitable for surface decompression or emergency use at a dive site
- Decompression algorithm – Procedure to calculate the decompression needed for a given dive profile
- Decompression bar – Horizontal bar suspended below the water surface at a decompression stop
- Decompression buoy – Inflatable surface marker buoy deployed from underwater
- Decompression ceiling – Theoretic limit to ascent with a decompression obligation
- Decompression chamber – Any pressure vessel for human occupancy used to decompress a person
- Decompression chamber operation – Operation of a hyperbaric chamber in support of underwater diving
- Decompression computer, also known as dive computer – Instrument to calculate decompression status in real time
- Decompression cylinder – Scuba cylinder carrying decompression gas
- Decompression dive – Dive profile which incurs obligatory decompression
- Decompression (diving) – Pressure reduction and its effects during ascent from depth
- Decompression efficiency – Acceptable safety in a short decompression time
- Decompression emergency – Contingency threatening the diver's health during decompression
- Decompression equipment – Equipment used by divers to facilitate decompression
- Decompression gas – Oxygen-rich gas used for accelerated decompression
- Decompression illness – Disorders arising from ambient pressure reduction
- Decompression mode – Way in which decompression may be done
- Decompression model – Conceptual explanation for decompression that helps formulate predictions
- Decompression modelling – Using conceptual explanation for decompression to help formulate predictions
- Decompression monitoring equipment – Equipment for monitoring depth and run time of a dive, and decompression status
- Decompression obligation – Physiological requirement for decompression to reduce risk of injury
- Decompression planning – Estimating the decompression for a planned dive profile
- Decompression practice – Techniques and procedures for safe decompression of divers
- Decompression profile – Dive profile incurring obligatory decompression
- Decompression safety – How well a decompression controls risk of DCS
- Decompression schedule – A specified ascent rate and series of increasingly shallower decompression stops
- Decompression sickness – Disorder caused by dissolved gases forming bubbles in tissues
- Decompression station – Place set up to facilitate the planned decompression for a dive team
- Decompression status – The theoretical level of inert gas content of the body tissues
- Decompression status monitoring – Keeping appraised of whether and how much decompression is required by a diver
- Decompression stop – Pause during tascent from a dive to release dissolved inert gas in tissues
- Decompression stress – Combined influences on formation of decompression gas bubbles
- Decompression theory – Theoretical modelling of decompression physiology
- Decompression trapeze – Horizontal bars suspended at decompression stop depths
- de Corlieu, Louis – French naval officer and inventor of the swimfin
- Deep air diving – Underwater diving beyond accepted limits for breathing air
- Deep air diving blackout – Loss of consciousness due to extreme nitrogen narcosis
- Deepblu – Manufacturer of dive computers
- DeepC – Autonomous underwater vehicle powered by a fuel cell
- Deep Diver – Research submersible
- Deep diving – Underwater diving to a depth beyond the norm accepted by the associated community
- Deep Drone – US Navy remotely operated underwater vehicle
- DeepFlight Merlin – 3-seater wet sub diver propulsion vehicle
- Deepsea Challenger – Submersible that traveled to the Challenger Deep
- Deepspot – Deep swimming pool in Poland
- Deep-submergence rescue vehicle – Submersible used for rescue of people from disabled submarines and submersibles
- Deep stop – Additional stop deeper than the first obligatory decompression stop
- Deep water blackout (disambiguation)
- Deep water submersible – Self-propelled deep-diving crewed submersible
- Defence Diving School – Diver training centre in Portsmouth Harbour, England
- Defense against swimmer incursions – Methods of protection from incursions by divers and swimmers
- Defence and Civil Institute of Environmental Medicine – Canadian research institute which produced decompression tables
- Delta-P (hazard), also known as ΔP, δp – Underwater hazard due to strong localised pressure differential
- Delta P Technology – Technical dive computer manufacturer
- Deluge sprinkler system – Sprinklers that spray water over the entire hazard when activated
- Demand controlled breathing apparatus – Equipment that supplied breathing gas only when required
- Demand helmet – Diving helmet supplied with gas through a demand valve
- Demand valve oxygen therapy – Use of high-inhalation concentrations of oxygen as medical treatment
- Demister (scuba) – Surfactant used to prevent condensation of water droplets on a mask or helmet viewport
- Demobilise (diving) – The dismantling, packing and transport back to storage of the dive spread
- Demographics of recreational diving – Population distribution of recreational divers
- Demographics of scientific divers – Population distribution of scientific divers
- Denayrouze, Auguste – French inventor of a demand air supply regulator for underwater diving
- Dental barotrauma – Damage to a tooth caused by a change of ambient pressure
- Department of Employment and Labour – Department of the South African government responsible for matters related to employment
- Deployment of a decompression buoy – Launching a delayed surface marker buoy
- Depth blackout – Loss of consciousness due to deep diving while breathing air
- Depth gauge – Instrument that indicates depth below a reference surface
- DEPTHX – Autonomous underwater vehicle for exploring sinkholes in Mexico
- Descending and ascending (diving) – Procedures for safe ascent and descent in underwater diving
- Descending excursion – Saturation dive where ambient pressure is more than storage pressure
- DESCO – American manufacturer of commercial diving equipment
- DESCO air hat – Surface -supplied diving free-flow helmet
- Developed pressure – Working pressure corrected for actual temperature

=== Di ===
Section contents: Top of section, Da–Dd, De, Di, Do, Dr, Ds, Du–Dw, Dy

- Diamond Reef System – Portable underwater obstacle course for scuba diving skill assessment and training
- Diffuser (breathing set part) – Component fitted over the exhaust outlet to break up the exhaled gas
- Diffusion – Transport of dissolved species from the highest to the lowest concentration region
- Diluent flush, also known as dil flush – Rebreather diving safety procedure
- Diluent gas – Metabolically inert gas in a breathing mixture
- DIN 477 – German standard for gas cylinder valves
- DIN 7876 – German standard for manufacture of swimfins
- DIN connection – Scuba cylinder standard valve connection
- Dip tube – Tube at the valve base to keep detritus out of the inlet
- DIR philosophy – An approach to scuba diving safety
- Directed search – Underwater search directed from the surface
- Disappearance of Ben McDaniel – Scuba diver who disappeared during or after a cave dive
- Distance line, also known as guide line – Line deployed by scuba divers for navigation
- Diuresis – Increase in urine production
- Dive bag – Container for transporting personal diving equipment
- Dive boat – Boat used for the support of scuba diving operations
- Dive boat operation – Operational procedures for a boat supporting diving
- Dive boat skipper – Person in command of a dive boat
- Dive briefing – Meeting of the dive team to discuss details before the diving operation
- Dive center – Service organisation providing recreational diver training, equipment and dive outings
- Dive computer, also known as Decompression computer – Instrument to calculate decompression status in real time
- Dive computer algorithm – Program for calculating decompression status and an acceptably safe ascent profile
- Dive computer failure modes – Ways that a personal decompression computer can malfunction
- Dive computer lockout – Programmed shutdown of decompression information
- Dive cylinder – Cylinder to supply breathing gas for divers
- Dive guide (disambiguation)
- Dive guide (publication) – Travel guides for recreational diving
- Dive leader, also known as dive guide, divemaster – Recreational diving certification and role
- Dive Leader – Recreational diving certification
- Dive light – Light used underwater by a diver
- Dive location – Location at which a dive may occur
- Dive log – Record of diving history of an underwater diver
- Dive mode (dive computer) – Functional options that can be selected by the user
- Dive plan – Product of dive planning activity
- Dive planning – Process of planning an underwater diving operation
- Dive planning software – Applications for gas planning and decompression planning
- Dive profile – Diver's pressure exposure over the time of a dive
- Dive resort – Recreational diving service provider with accommodation
- Dive school – Establishment for diver training
- Dive site – Place at which underwater diving occurs
- Dive skins – Thin exposure suit to protect the skin in warm water
- Divesoft – Manufacturer of diving rebreathers and accessories
- Dive spool – Simple flanged cylindrical line-holder
- Dive spot – Location at which a dive may occur
- Dive suit – Garment or device designed to protect a diver from the underwater environment
- Dive supervisor – Recreational dive group leader responsible for safety
- Dive Supervisor – Recreational dive leadership certification
- Dive tables – Data used to determine a decompression schedule for a given dive profile and breathing gas
- Dive team – A group of people working together to enhance dive safety and achieve a task
- Dive timer – Electronic timer that automatically records the run time of a dive
- Dive weights – Ballast weights carried by divers to counteract buoyancy of equipment
- Dive-float – Small buoy towed by an underwater diver to indicate presence
- Dive supervision – The work of the manager of a professional diving team
- Dive/surface valve (DSV) – Valve on a rebreather mouthpiece to isolate the breathing loop when not in use
- Divemaster – Recreational dive leader certification and role
- Diver, The – Sculpture by John Kaufman
- Diver (United States Navy) – US Navy personnel qualified in underwater diving and salvage
- Diver certification – Certification as competent to dive to a specified standard
- Diver certification agency – Organisation which issues certification for competence in diving skills
- Diver certification equivalences – Comparison between certifications by different agencies
- Diver certification organisation – Organisation that issues certificates of competence to underwater divers
- Diver communications – Methods used by underwater divers to communicate
- Diver detection sonar – Acoustic location systems to detect divers and submerged swimmer delivery vehicles
- Diver down flag – Flag signal indicating divers are in the water nearby
- Diver excursion – Diver temporary movement away from a reference point
- Diver hand signals – Hand signals used for communication with divers
- Diver lift – Movable platform for lifting a diver from the water to deck level
- Diver lock-out compartment – Airlock used for underwater access to a submarine
- Diver lock-out submersible – Manned submersible with an airlock for underwater use
- Diver medical technician – Paramedic with special training in diving medical emergencies
- Diver navigation – Underwater navigation by scuba divers
- Diver organisations – Membership organisations of underwater divers
- Diver propulsion vehicle (DPV) – Powered device for diver mobility and range extension
- Diver rescue – Rescue of a distressed or incapacitated diver
- Diver safety – Risk management by and for the diver
- Diver searches – Underwater searches carried out by divers.
- Diver sled – Unpowered steerable creboards towed by a surface boat
- Diver surface detection aids – Equipment to make a surfaced diver easier to find
- Diver training – Processes to develop the skills and knowledge to dive safely underwater
- Diver training manual – Documentary training aid used for training underwater divers
- Diver training agency – Organisation for training and certifying underwater divers
- Diver training organisation, also known as Diver training organization – Establishment where divers are trained and assessed
- Diver training referral system – System for allowing training to be completed by another instructor
- Diver training standard – Document describing requirements of a diver training programme
- Diver training tank – Tank of water to practice diving skills
- Diver trim – Balance and orientation skills of an underwater diver
- Diver voice communications – Protocol for spoken communications in diving operations
- Diver voice communication protocol – Procedures for effective communication with divers
- Diver weighting system – Ballast carried by underwater divers to counteract buoyancy
- Diver's air pump – Manually powered surface air supply for divers
- Divers Academy International – Technical educational institution in New Jersey that offers training in commercial diving
- Divers Alert Network (DAN) – Group for improving diving safety
- Divers Alert Network America – A not-for-profit diving safety organization based in the US
- Divers Alert Network Asia-Pacific – A not-for-profit diving safety organization based in Australia
- Divers Alert Network Europe – A not-for-profit diving safety organization based in Europe
- Divers Alert Network publications
- Divers Alert Network Southern Africa (DAN-SA) – A public benefit diving safety organization based in South Africa
- Diver's attendant – Assistant for a diver
- Diver's cutting tool – A tool to assist in extricating the diver from entrapment by lines or nets
- Diver's harness – Item fastened around a diver which allows the diver to be lifted
- Divers Institute of Technology – Private, commercial educational institution for the training of commercial divers
- Diver's knife – A tool to assist in extricating the diver from entrapment by lines or nets
- Diver's logbook – Record of diving history of an underwater diver
- Diversnight – Annual night diving festival
- Diver's pump – Manually powered surface air supply for divers
- Diver's safety harness – Harness suitable for lifting a diver out of the water
- Diver's telephone – Hard wired diver communications equipment
- Diver's tender – Assistant to a diver
- Diver's umbilical – Hose supplying breathing gas to a diver from the support platform
- Divex – Scottish provider of diving equipment and related services
- Diviac – Online booking site for diving holidays
- Diving accident – Accident occurring while diving underwater
- Diving accident investigation – Forensic investigation into causes of reportable incidents
- Diving activities – Things people do while diving underwater
- Diving air compressor, also known as diving compressor – Machine used to compress breathing air for use by underwater divers
- Diving air compressor operator – Person who operates a diving air compressor
- Diving air filter – Device to purify compressed breathing air
- Diving air pump – Manually powered surface air supply for divers
- Diving at altitude – Diving where surface pressure is equivalent to an altitude more than 300m
- Diving attendant – Member of a dive team responsible for assisting the diver
- Diving at Work Regulations 1997 – UK legislation regulating all aspects of professional diving
- Diving basket – Platform for lowering and lifting a diver through the water
- Diving bell – Chamber for transporting divers vertically through the water
- Diving bell cross-haul system, also known as diving bell cross-hauling system – Cables to move a bell laterally under the water
- Diving bell deployment – Deployment of a modern diving bell
- Diving boat – Boat used for the support of scuba diving operations
- Diving buddy – Diver who dives as one of a buddy pair
- Diving certification – Evidence of having been trained to a standard
- Diving chamber – Hyperbaric pressure vessel for human occupancy used in diving operations
- Diving chamber operation – Operation of a hyperbaric chamber in support of underwater diving
- Diving compass – Compass intended for diver navigation
- Diving contractor – The legal persona responsible for professional diving operations for a client
- Diving control board – Group with responsibility for all scientific diving work done by an American organisation
- Diving cylinder – Container to supply high pressure gas for diving operations
- Diving cylinder sustained load cracking – Tensile stress failure of aluminium diving cylinders
- Diving destination – Places where recreational divers go on vacation
- Diving Diseases Research Centre (DDRC)
- Diving disorders – Physiological disorders resulting from underwater diving
- Diving emergency – Situation that endangers the life or health of a diver
- Diving environment – Characteristics of the environment in which underwater diving takes place
- Diving equipment – Equipment used to facilitate underwater diving
- Diving Equipment and Marketing Association (DEMA) – International trade association for the recreational diving equipment industry
- Diving equipment maintenance and testing – Ensuring that the equipment is safe to use
- Diving equipment technician – Person who maintains, repairs and tests diving and support equipment
- Diving fatalities – Deaths associated with underwater diving
- Diving flag – Flag signal indicating divers are in the water nearby
- Diving gas – Gas used by underwater divers, usually for breathing
- Diving gas analysis – Measuring the components in a breathing gas blend
- Diving gas mixture – Mixture of gases suitable for hyperbaric respiration
- Diving glove – Hand protection worn while driving
- Diving half-mask – Mask covering the nose and eyes of an underwater diver
- Diving hand signals – A form of sign system used to communicate underwater
- Diving harness – Item fastened around a diver which allows the diver to be lifted
- Diving hazards – Agents and situations that pose a threat to the underwater diver
- Diving heavy – Underwater diving while intentionally negatively buoyant
- Diving helmet – Rigid head enclosure for underwater diving
- Diving incident and accident investigation – Forensic investigation of underwater diving accidents
- Diving in cold water – Diving in water where heat loss is a serious problem
- Diving in cool water – Conditions where heat loss is easily managed
- Diving in freezing water – Diving in water temperatures near freezing point
- Diving in hot water – Diving in conditions where active cooling is necessary
- Diving instructor – Person who trains and assesses underwater divers
- Diving Instructor – Person who trains and assesses underwater divers
- Diving instrument console – Mounting for a group of scuba diving instruments
- Diving in warm water – Diving in conditions where no thermal protection is needed
- Diving jackstay – Form of guideline laid between two points to guide the diver
- Diving jargon – Definitions of jargon, diver slang and acronyms used in underwater diving
- Diving ladder – Ladder to facilitate egress from the water by divers
- Diving law – Laws directly affecting diving activities
- Diving legislation – Legislation directly affecting diving activity
- Diving light – Portable light source for use underwater
- Diving line signals – Standard signals coded in the form of tugs on the diver's lifeline
- Diving locations – Places that divers go to enjoy the underwater environment
- Diving logbook – Record of diving history of an underwater diver
- Diving mask – Face cover to improve underwater vision
- Diving mask clearing – Removing water from a flooded diving mask underwater
- Diving Medical Advisory Council (DMAC) – Independent organisation of diving medical specialists from Northern Europe
- Diving medical examination – Assessment of medical fitness to dive
- Diving medical examiner – A medical practitioner registered to assess medical fitness to dive
- Diving Medical Examiner – A medical practitioner registered to assess medical fitness to dive
- Diving medical practitioner – Specialist in diagnosis, treatment and prevention of disorders caused by underwater diving
- Diving Medical Practitioner – Specialist in diving medicine
- Diving medical technician – Person trained in advanced first aid for divers
- Diving Medical Technician – Person trained in advanced first aid for divers
- Diving medicine – Diagnosis, treatment and prevention of disorders caused by underwater diving
- Diving Medicine Physician – Doctor registered as competent to manage diving accidents
- Diving mode – The conceptual variations of underwater diving
- Diving operation – Underwater dive and support activities to achieve a specific goal
- Diving operations record – Documentation recording a professional dive
- Diving physics – Aspects of physics which affect the underwater diver
- Diving physiology – Influences of the underwater environment on the physiology of human divers
- Diving platform (scuba) – Low freeboard platform on a dive boat to give divers easy access to the water
- Diving procedures – Standardised methods of doing things that are known to work effectively and acceptably safely
- Diving project – The overall diving job by a diving contractor under a specific contract
- Diving rebreather – Closed or semi-closed circuit scuba
- Diving reflex – Physiological responses to immersion of air-breathing vertebrates
- Diving regulations – Stipulations of the delegated legislation regarding the practice of underwater diving
- Diving regulator – Mechanism that controls the pressure of a breathing gas supply for diving
- Diving regulator clearing – Removal of water from a scuba regulator mouthpiece
- Diving regulator malfunction – Failure modes of breathing gas control valves for underwater diving
- Diving response – The physiological responses to immersion of air-breathing vertebrates
- Diving safety – Risk management of underwater diving activities
- Diving safety equipment – Equipment used to facilitate underwater diving safety
- Diving safety harness – A harness by which the diver can safely be lifted
- Diving safety officer – Administrator of a US university's research diving safety program
- Diving school – Establishment for training and assessing underwater divers
- Diving Science and Technology (DSAT) – PADI affiliate and developer of recreational decompression planning tools
- Diving shot, also known as shot line – Substantial weighted near-vertical line with buoy
- Diving signal – Signals made by divers for communication
- Diving skins – Suit worn to protect the skin from jellyfish stings, abrasion and sunburn
- Diving spread – The topside base for commercial diving operations
- Diving stage – Platform on which a diver is transported vertically through the water
- Diving stage deployment – Launch and recovery of a diving stage
- Diving suit – Garment or device designed to protect a diver from the underwater environment
- Diving suit hood – Protective headgear worn by underwater diver
- Diving superintendent – A management position responsible for diving operations
- Diving supervisor – Professional diving team leader responsible for safety
- Diving support equipment – Equipment used in the support of an underwater diving operation
- Diving support personnel – People involved in the support of diving operations
- Diving support vessel – Ship used as a floating base for professional diving projects
- Diving systems technician – A competent person who maintains and repairs diving life-support equipment
- Diving team – Group of people working together to enhance dive safety and achieve a task
- Diving team tools and equipment – Equipmemt shared by the members of a diving team
- Diving terminology – Definitions of technical terms, jargon, diver slang and acronyms used in underwater diving
- Diving terms – Definitions of technical terms, jargon, diver slang and acronyms used in underwater diving
- Diving theory – The knowledge required for safe diving
- Diving tourism – Tourism focused on recreational diving activities
- Diving tourism industry – Industry based on recreational diver travel
- Diving Unlimited International – American manufacturer of dry suits and other diving equipment
- Diving watch – Watch designed for underwater diving
- Diving weight – Ballast carried by a diver to counteract buoyancy or adjust trim
- Diving weight harness – Diver ballast system supported by straps over the shoulders
- Diving weighting system – Ballast carried to counteract buoyancy

=== Do ===
Section contents: Top of section, Da–Dd, De, Di, Do, Dr, Ds, Du–Dw, Dy

- Doing It Right (scuba diving) (DIR) – Technical diving safety philosophy
- Donald Duck effect – Type of speech distortion caused by the breathing gas
- Donald, Kenneth William – British expert on underwater and exercise physiology
- Doppler bubble detection, also known as ultrasonic bubble detection – Detection of vascular bubbles by ultrasound
- Downline (diving) – Rope from the surface to an underwater workplace
- Downstream scuba manifold – Component used to functionally connect scuba cylinders
- Downstream valve – Valve which is opened along the pressure differential
- Downward excursion – Saturation dive where ambient pressure is more than storage pressure

=== Dr ===
Section contents: Top of section, Da–Dd, De, Di, Do, Dr, Ds, Du–Dw, Dy

- Dräger (company) – German manufacturer of breathing equipment
- Dräger Atlantis – Semi-closed circuit recreational diving rebreather
- Dräger DM20 oxygen rebreather system – Oxygen rebreather system for copper helmet
- Dräger DM40 mixed gas rebreather system – Nitrox rebreather system for copper helmet
- Dräger Dolphin – Semi-closed circuit recreational diving rebreather
- Dräger Modell 1915 Bubikopf helmet – Copper helmet for rebreather systems
- Dräger Ray – Semi-closed circuit diving rebreather
- Draining the rebreather loop – Removing water from the breathing circuit
- Drass-Galeazzi – Italian manufacturer of lightweight diving helmets
- DRDC Toronto – Major military research station in Canada
- Drift diving – Scuba diving where the diver is intentionally transported by the water flow
- Drifting surface buoy – Oceanographic instrument package floating at the surface transported by current
- Drill Master diving accident – Fatal diving bell accident off Norway in 1974
- Drop cylinder, also known as Drop-cylinder – Scuba set intended to be placed along the route and recovered on the return
- Drop tank (scuba) – Scuba set placed along the guideline on a cave dive for later use
- Drowning – Respiratory impairment caused by submersion in liquid
- Dry bell – Hyperbaric chamber for transporting diversvertically through the water
- Dry Combat Submersible – Midget submarine project
- Dry suit – Watertight clothing that seals the wearer from cold and hazardous liquids
- Dry suit blowup – Over-inflation of a dry suit causing uncontrolled ascent
- Dry suit diver – Certification for diving in a dry suit
- Dry suit inflation cylinder – Diving cylinder dedicated for suit inflation gas
- Dry suit inflation hose – Low pressure inflation gas supply
- Dry suit inflation valve – Manual valve to admit low pressure gas into a diving dry suit
- Dry suit inflator – Equipment to add air inside a diver's dry suit
- Dry suit inversion and blowup – Dangerous malfunction or misuse of diving dry suit
- Dry suit squeeze – Compression of the dry suit at depth which can pinch the skin and restrict motion

=== Ds ===
Section contents: Top of section, Da–Dd, De, Di, Do, Dr, Ds, Du–Dw, Dy

- DSRV-2 Avalon – Mystic-class deep-submergence rescue vehicle
- DSV-5 Nemo – Submersible used by the United States Navy
- DSV Alvin – Crewed deep-ocean research submersible
- DSV Bakunawa – Crewed full ocean depth rated submersible
- DSV Fendouzhe – Chinese deep submergence vehicle
- DSV Limiting Factor – Crewed full ocean depth rated submersible
- DSV Sea Cliff – US Navy crewed deep-ocean research submersible
- DSV Shinkai – Crewed research submersible
- DSV Shinkai 2000 – Japanese crewed research submersible
- DSV Shinkai 6500 – Japanese crewed research submersible
- DSV Turtle – US Navy crewed deep-ocean research submersible

=== Du–Dw ===
Section contents: Top of section, Da–Dd, De, Di, Do, Dr, Ds, Du–Dw, Dy

- Dual bladder buoyancy compensator – Scuba diving buoyancy compensator with redundant air bag
- Dual outlet valve – Scuba cylinder valve body with two regulator connections each with its own valve
- Duckbill valve – Type of check valve
- Dump valve (diving) – Pressure relief and manual vent on diving buoyancy compensator
- Dutch Underwater Sports Association – Dutch governing body for underwater sports
- Duty of care – Type of legal obligation
- Dwell time (filtration) – Time that fluid spends passing through active filter medium

=== Dy ===
Section contents: Top of section, Da–Dd, De, Di, Do, Dr, Ds, Du–Dw, Dy

- Dynamic apnea – Freediving disciplines where the diver swims horizontally under water
- Dynamic compression of the airways, also known as dynamic airway compression – Mechanism reducing lung airway section area during forced expiration
- Dynamic positioning – Automatic ship station- and heading-holding systems
- Dynamically positioned vessel (DPV) – Ship with automatic station- and heading-holding systems
- Dynamically Positioned Vessel Owners Association (DPVOA) – Precursor to International Marine Contractors Association
- Dysbaric osteonecrosis – Ischemic bone disease caused by decompression bubbles
- Dysbarism – Medical conditions resulting from changes in ambient pressure

== E ==
Contents: Top	0–9	A	B	C	D	E	F	G	H	I	J	K	L	M	N	O	P	Q	R	S	T	U	V	W	X	Y	Z

Section contents: Top of section, Ea–Ek, El, Em, En–Ep, Eq–Er, Es, Eu–Ev, Ex

=== Ea–Ek ===
- Ear clearing, also known as ear equalisation – Equalising of pressure in the middle ears
- Ebullism – Formation of vapour bubbles in bodily fluids due to reduced environmental pressure
- Ecological impact of recreational diving – Effects of scuba diving on the underwater environment
- Eelume – Autonomous underwater vehicle being developed by Eelume AS
- Effects of drugs on fitness to dive – Known side-effects and contraindications of drugs commonly used by divers
- Ekman transport – Net transport of surface water perpendicular to wind direction

=== El ===
Section contents: Top of section, Ea–Ek, El, Em, En–Ep, Eq–Er, Es, Eu–Ev, Ex

- Electro-galvanic oxygen sensor – Electrochemical device for measuring oxygen partial pressure
- Electronically controlled closed circuit rebreather – Underwater breathing apparatus with automatic gas composition control

=== Em ===
Section contents: Top of section, Ea–Ek, El, Em, En–Ep, Eq–Er, Es, Eu–Ev, Ex

- Emergency air sharing, also known as emergency gas sharing, and emergency breathing gas sharing – Supply of breathing air from one scuba diver to another
- Emergency ascent – Ascent to the surface by a diver in an emergency
- Emergency breathing gas sharing – Supply of breathing gas from one scuba diver to another
- Emergency buoyant ascent – Emergency procedure in underwater diving
- Emergency closed bell procedures, also known as closed bell emergency procedures – Standard procedures for use in common surface-supplied closed bell diving emergencies
- Emergency decompression – Decompression which accepts a normally unacceptable risk to avoid a more severe risk
- Emergency decompression from saturation – Accelerated decompression from saturation at a normally unacceptable rate
- Emergency ditching of diving weights – Emergency removal of diving weights to increase buoyancy
- Emergency gas sharing – Supply of breathing gas from one scuba diver to another
- Emergency gas supply – Alternative independent breathing gas supply carried by a diver
- Emergency heating of a diving bell – Systems to heat a disabled closed bell while waiting for rescue
- Emergency heating of divers – Thermal support for trapped divers in a closed bell
- Emergency procedure – Plan of action to deal with an emergency
- Emergency Response Diving International (ERDI) – American organisation for training and certification of emergency response divers
- Emergency response plan – Action to be taken in specific emergencies
- Emergency swimming ascent (ESA) – Emergency procedure used by scuba divers
- Emergency tethered ascent, also known as buoyant tethered ascent – Positive buoyancy emergency ascent using a reel upline
- Emergency wet bell procedures, also known as wet bell emergency procedures – Standard procedures for use in common surface-supplied wet bell diving emergencies

=== En–Ep ===
Section contents: Top of section, Ea–Ek, El, Em, En–Ep, Eq–Er, Es, Eu–Ev, Ex

- EN 1972:1997 – European standard for design and manufacture of snorkels
- Engineer diver (disambiguation)
- Engineering controls – Hazard controls that are physical changes to the workplace
- Engineering redundancy – Duplication of critical components to increase reliability of a system
- Entanglement (hazard) – Entrapment by lines or nets
- Entry level diver – Minimum competence deemed sufficient for diver safety
- Entry level diver training – Minimum standard for diver trainingu in a given context
- Entry level recreational diver training – Minimum standard for entry level recreational scuba diver training
- Environmental effects of scuba diving – Effects of recreational scuba diving on the underwater environment
- Environmental impact of recreational diving – Effects of scuba diving on the underwater environment
- Environmental impact of scuba diving – Effects of recreational scuba diving on the underwater environment
- Épaulard – French remotely operated underwater vehicle of the Ifremer

=== Eq–Er ===
Section contents: Top of section, Ea–Ek, El, Em, En–Ep, Eq–Er, Es, Eu–Ev, Ex

- Equalising the ears – Balancing pressure in the middle ears with ambient pressure
- Equivalent air depth – Method of comparing decompression requirements for air and a given nitrox mix
- Equivalent narcotic depth – Method for comparing the narcotic effects of a mixed diving gas with air
- Ergonomics of diving equipment – Interaction between diving equipment and the diver

=== Es ===
Section contents: Top of section, Ea–Ek, El, Em, En–Ep, Eq–Er, Es, Eu–Ev, Ex

- Escape breathing apparatus – Self contained breathing apparatus providing gas to escape from a hazardous environment
- Escape trunk – Ambient pressure escape system for submarines

=== Eu–Ev ===
Section contents: Top of section, Ea–Ek, El, Em, En–Ep, Eq–Er, Es, Eu–Ev, Ex

- EUF Certification International – Independent body for global verification of rebreather training agencies
- Eurocylinder Systems AG, also known as Eurocylinder – German manufacturer of seamless steel pressure cylinders for gas
- European Diving Technology Committee (EDTC) – International organisation for improving professional diver safety
- European Scientific Diver – Qualification for scientific divers
- European Scientific Diving Panel – A panel of the European Network of Marine Research Institutes and Stations
- European Underwater and Baromedical Society (EUBS) – Source of information for diving and hyperbaric medicine
- European Underwater Federation (EUF) – Umbrella organisation representing scuba diver training organisations in Europe
- Evacuation plan – Plan for removal of personnel from a high risk area or a developing incident to a safer place

=== Ex ===
Section contents: Top of section, Ea–Ek, El, Em, En–Ep, Eq–Er, Es, Eu–Ev, Ex

- Exceptional Exposure Tables – Air diving tables for unusually long and deep dives
- Excursion from storage depth – Change of depth from the nominal depth in the saturation habitat
- Excursion range – Acceptable range of excursion depths from a storage depth
- Excursion umbilical – A diver's umbilical supplied from a bell gas panel
- Excursion window – Acceptable range of excursion depths from a storage depth
- Exercise Paddington Diamond – Joint Bolivian-British-Swiss scuba diving expedition to Lake Titicaca
- Expanding square search – Search pattern expanding stepwise outward from datum
- Explorer AUV – Autonomous underwater vehicle from People's Republic of China
- Explosive ordnance disposal (United States Navy) – US Navy personnel who render safe or detonate unexploded ordnance
- Exponential–Linear model – Decompression model based on exponential gas uptake and linear elimination
- Exposure assessment – Measuring toxic or environment exposure
- Exposure to a pressurised environment – Hazard of the underwater diving environment
- Exposure to large ambient pressure changes – Underwater diving and hyperbaric work hazard
- Extended oxygen window – Concept in physiology of decompression
- Extended range surface-supplied air diver – Surface-supplied offshore air diving to 50 msw using a wet bell and hot water suit
- External dead space – Space in breating apparatus in which the breathing gas flows in both directions

Contents: Top	0–9	A	B	C	D	E	F	G	H	I	J	K	L	M	N	O	P	Q	R	S	T	U	V	W	X	Y	Z

== See also ==
- Glossary of underwater diving terminology
