= Booster pump =

Machine to increase pressure of a fluid

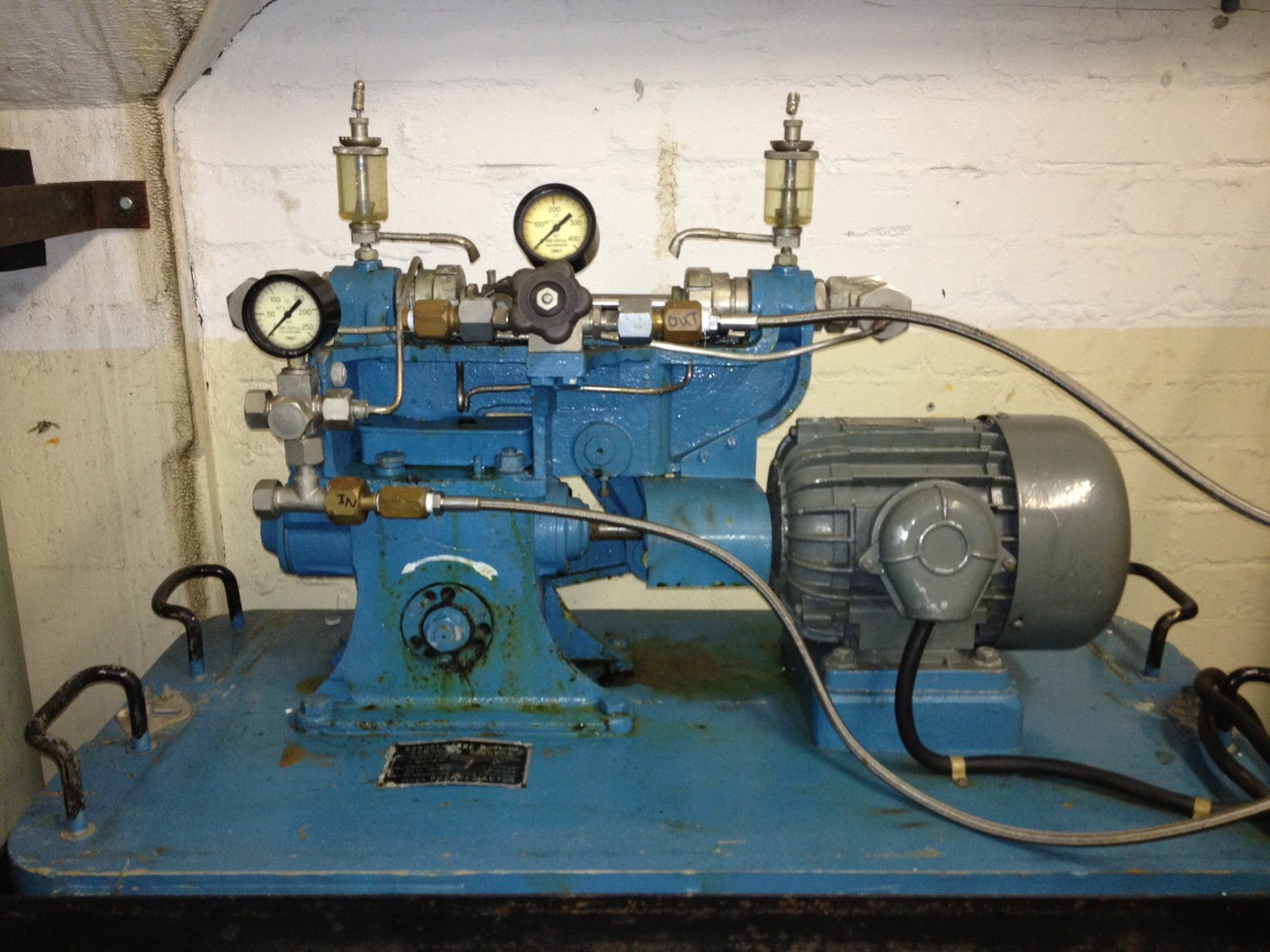
- Front view of Russian oxygen booster pump
- Uses: Increasing the pressure of a fluid
- Related items: Compressor

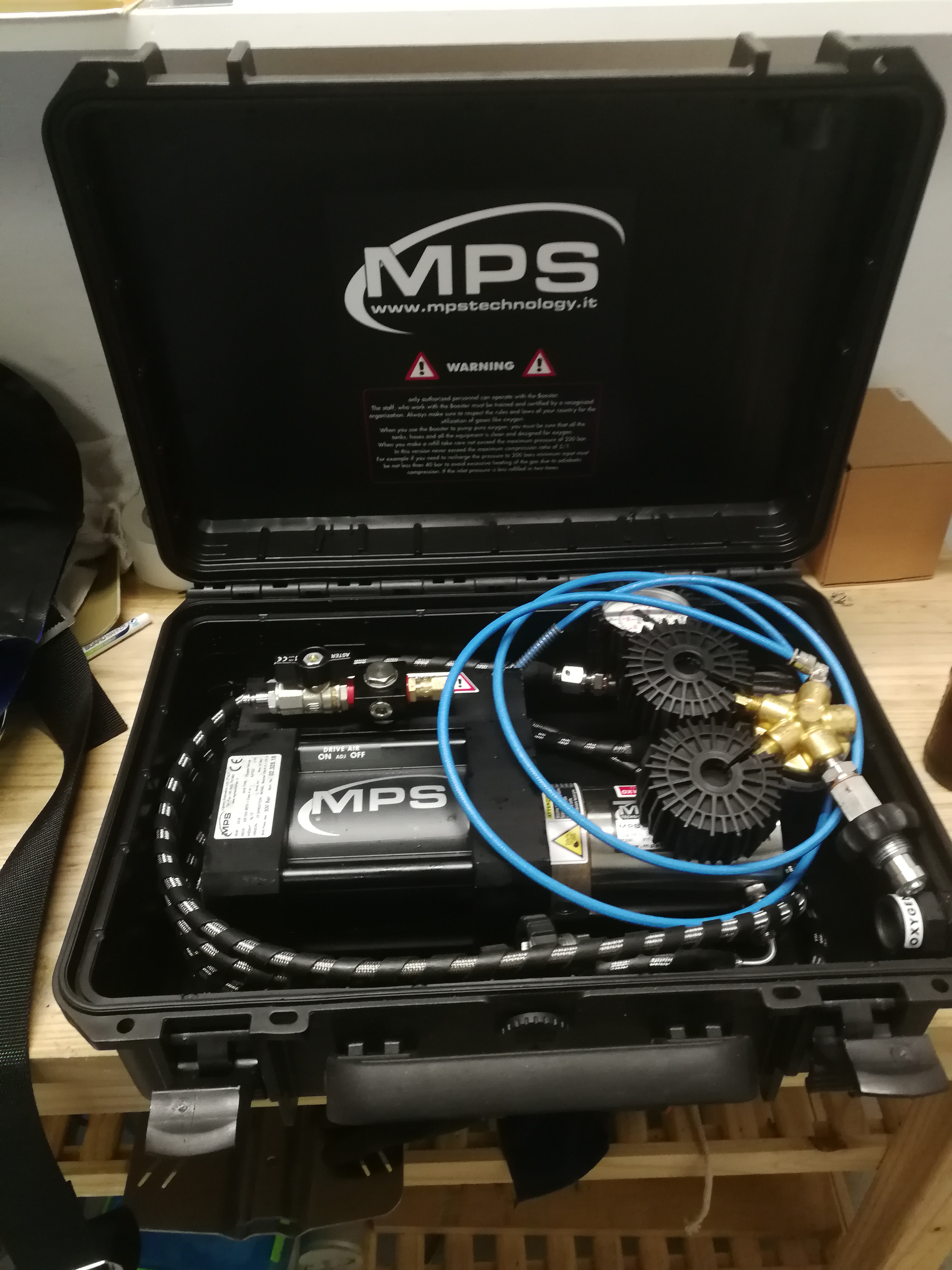
Small compressed air powered breathing gas booster pump

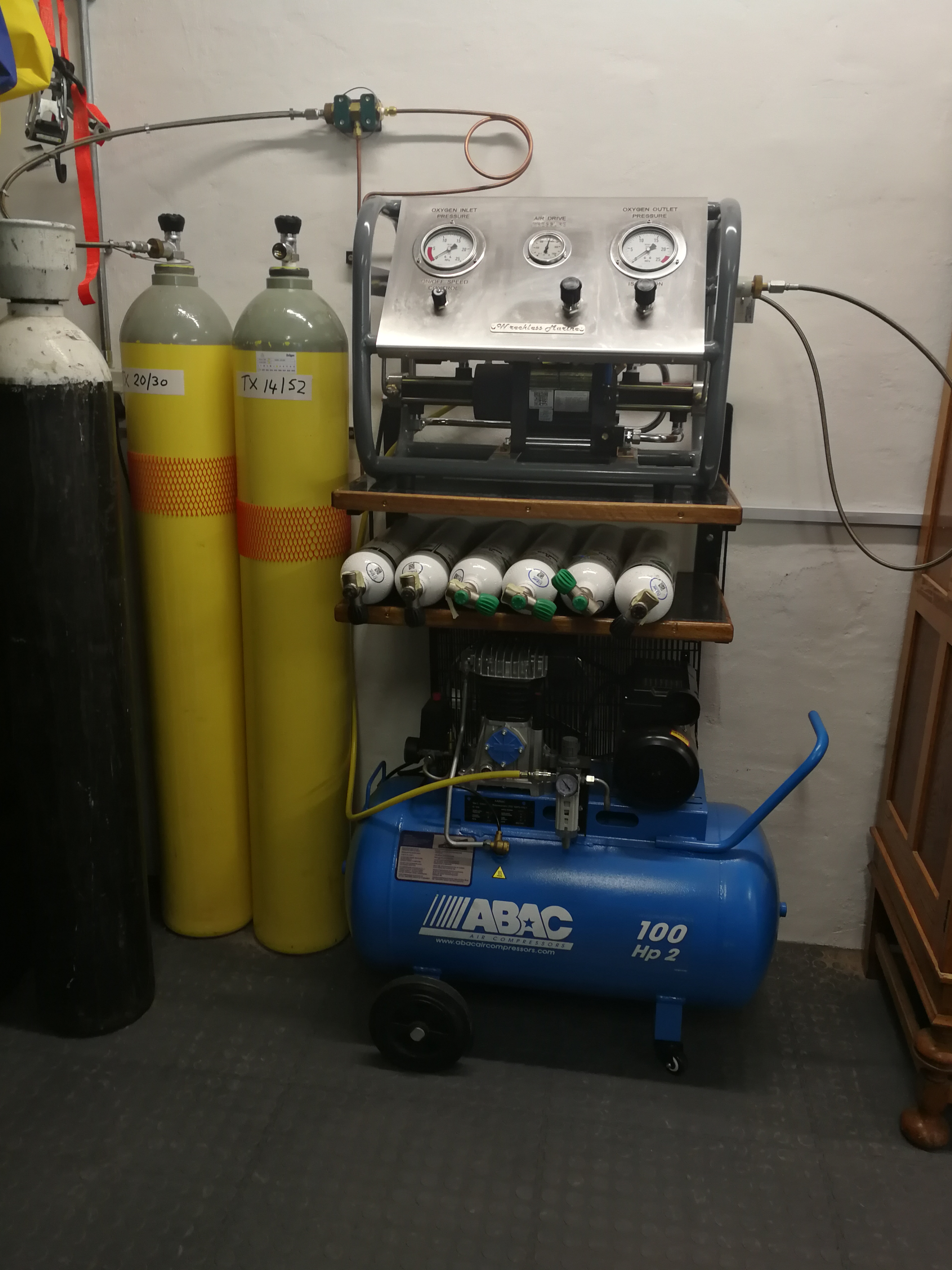
Haskell booster set up for charging rebreather cylinders from premix banks with low pressure compressor

A booster pump is a machine which increases the pressure of a fluid. It may be used with liquids or gases, and the construction details vary depending on the fluid. A gas booster is similar to a gas compressor, but generally a simpler mechanism which often has only a single stage of compression, and is used to increase pressure of a gas already above ambient pressure. Two-stage boosters are also made. Boosters may be used for increasing gas pressure, transferring high pressure gas, charging gas cylinders and scavenging.

== Water pressure ==
On new construction and retrofit projects, water pressure booster pumps are used to provide adequate water pressure to upper floors of high rise buildings. The need for a water pressure booster pump can also arise after the installation of a backflow prevention device (BFP), which is currently mandated in many municipalities to protect the public water supplies from contaminants within a building entering the public water supply. The use of BFPs began after The Clean Water Act was passed. These devices can cause a loss of 12 PSI, and can cause flushometers on upper floors not to work properly. After pipes have been in service for an extended period, scale can build up on the inside surfaces which will cause a pressure drop when the water flows.

=== Water pressure booster construction and function ===
Booster pumps for household water pressure are usually simple electrically driven centrifugal pumps with a non-return valve. They may be constant speed pumps which switch on when pressure drops below the low pressure set-point and switch off when pressure reaches the high set-point, or variable speed pumps which are controlled to maintain a constant output pressure.

Constant speed pumps are switched on by a normally closed low-pressure switch and will content to run until the pressure rises to open the high pressure switch. They will cycle whenever enough water is used to cause a pressure drop below the low set point. An accumulator in the upstream pipeline will reduce cycling.

Variable speed pumps use pressure feedback to electronically control motor speed to maintain a reasonably constant discharge pressure. Most applications run off AC mains current and use an inverter to control motor speed.

Installations that provide water to highrise buildings may need boosters at several levels to provide acceptably consistent pressure on all floors. In such a case independent boosters may be installed at various levels, each boosting the pressure provided by the next lower level. It is also possible to boost once to the maximum pressure required, and then to use a pressure reducer at each level. This method would be used if there is a holding tank on the roof with gravity feed to the supply system.

== Fire sprinkler booster pumps ==
Multi-story buildings equipped with fire sprinkler systems may require a large booster pump to deliver sufficient water pressure and volume to upper floors in the event of a fire. Such pumps are often powered by a diesel engine dedicated to this purpose. The engine needs a fuel tank and an automatic controller that will start the booster pump when it is needed. A small auxiliary electrically powered booster pump (called a "jockey pump") is often included in the system to maintain the sprinkler pipes at sufficient pressure, without requiring startup of the large diesel engine.

Any emergency system must be periodically tested and maintained to ensure its reliability. A diesel engine must be started and operated for testing, and a battery bank for the starting motor must be maintained or replaced periodically. In recent years, a larger electrical pump with substantial battery backup may be substituted for the diesel engine, reducing but not eliminating the need for maintenance.

== Gas pressure ==
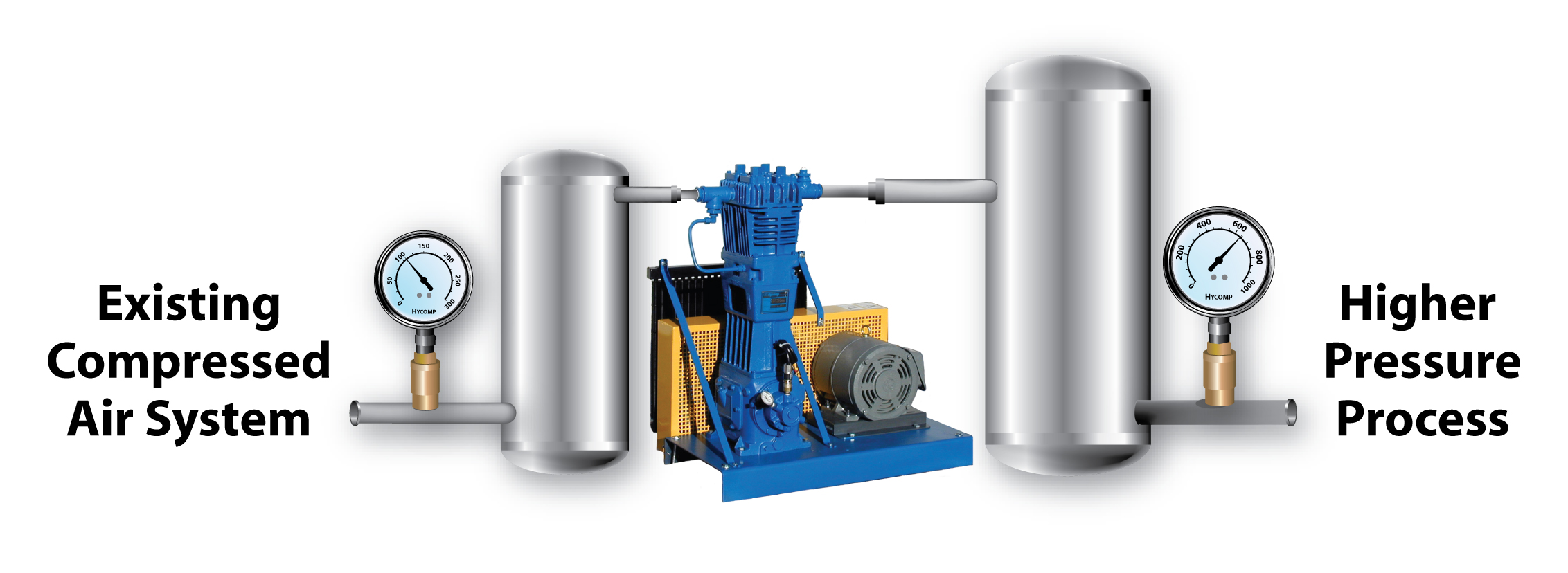
Principle of a gas booster pump used to increase pressure of a compressed air supply

Gas pressure boosting may be used to fill storage cylinders to a higher pressure than the available gas supply, or to provide production gas at pressure higher than line pressure. Examples include:

- Breathing gas blending for underwater diving where the gas is to be supplied from high-pressure cylinders, as in scuba, scuba replacement and surface-supplied mixed gas diving, where the component gases are blended by partial pressure addition to the storage cylinders, and the mixture storage pressure may be higher than the available pressure of the components.
- Helium reclaim systems, where the heliox breathing gas exhaled by a saturation diver is piped back to the surface, oxygen is added to make up the required composition, and the gas is boosted to the appropriate supply pressure, filtered, scrubbed of carbon dioxide, and returned to the gas distribution panel to be supplied to the diver again, or returned to high pressure storage
- Workshop compressed air is usually provided at a pressure suited to the majority of the applications, but some may need a higher pressure. A small booster can be effective to provide this air.

=== Gas booster construction and function ===
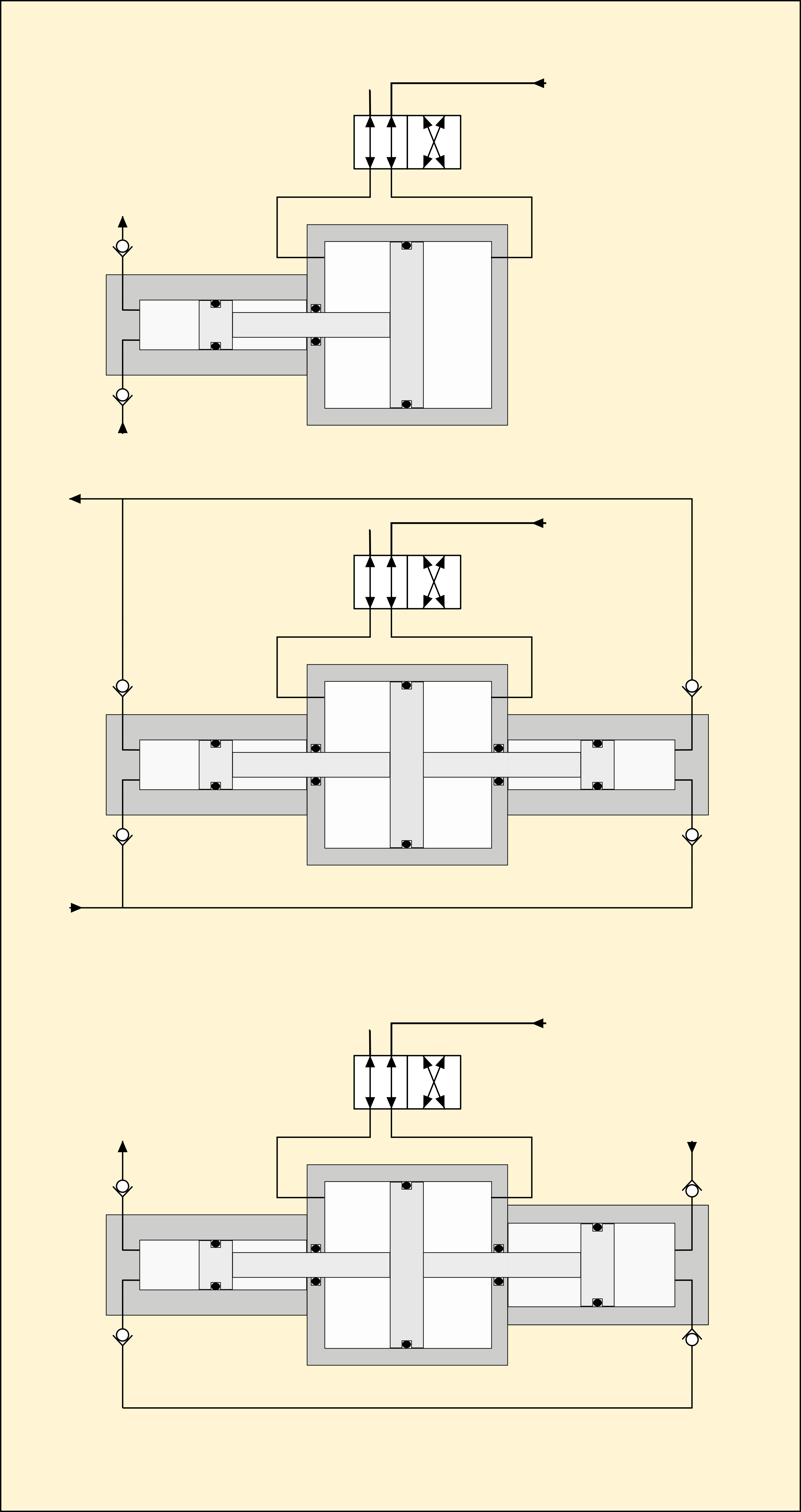
Schematic diagram of pneumatic powered gas booster types. Top to bottom: Single stage, single action; single stage double action; two stage double action.

Gas booster pumps are usually piston or plunger type compressors. A single-acting, single-stage booster is the simplest configuration, and comprises a cylinder, designed to withstand the operating pressures, with a piston which is driven back and forth inside the cylinder. The cylinder head is fitted with supply and discharge ports, to which the supply and discharge hoses or pipes are connected, with a non-return valve on each, constraining flow in one direction from supply to discharge. When the booster is inactive, and the piston is stationary, gas will flow from the inlet hose, through the inlet valve into the space between the cylinder head and the piston. If the pressure in the outlet hose is lower, it will then flow out and to whatever the outlet hose is connected to. This flow will stop when the pressure is equalized, taking valve opening pressures into account.

Once the flow has stopped, the booster is started, and as the piston withdraws along the cylinder, increasing the volume between the cylinder head and the piston crown, the pressure in the cylinder will drop, and gas will flow in from the inlet port. On the return cycle, the piston moves toward the cylinder head, decreasing the volume of the space and compressing the gas until the pressure is sufficient to overcome the pressure in the outlet line and the opening pressure of the outlet valve. At that point, the gas will flow out of the cylinder via the outlet valve and port.

There will always be some compressed gas remaining in the cylinder and cylinder head spaces at the top of the stroke. The gas in this "dead space" will expand during the next induction stroke, and only after it has dropped below the supply gas pressure, more supply gas will flow into the cylinder. The ratio of the volume of the cylinder space with the piston fully withdrawn, to the dead space, is the "compression ratio" of the booster, also termed "boost ratio" in this context. Efficiency of the booster is related to the compression ratio, and gas will only be transferred while the pressure ratio between supply and discharge gas is less than the boost ratio, and delivery rate will drop as the inlet to delivery pressure ratio increases.

Delivery rate starts at very close to swept volume when there is no pressure difference, and drops steadily until there is no effective transfer when the pressure ratio reaches the maximum boost ratio.

Compression of gas will cause a rise in temperature. The heat is mostly carried out by the compressed gas, but the booster components will also be heated by contact with the hot gas. Some boosters are cooled by water jackets or external fins to increase convectional cooling by the ambient air, but smaller models may have no special cooling facilities at all. Cooling arrangements will improve efficiency, but will cost more to manufacture.

Boosters to be used with oxygen must be made from oxygen-compatible materials, and use oxygen-compatible lubricants to avoid fire.

=== Configurations ===
- Single stage, single acting: There is one booster cylinder, which pressurizes the gas in one direction of piston movement, and refills the cylinder on the return stroke.
- Single stage, double acting: There are two booster cylinders, which operate alternately, with each one pressurizing gas while the other is refilling. The cylinders each pressurize gas-fed directly from the supply, and the delivered gas from each is combined at the outlets. The cylinders work in parallel and have the same bore.
- Two stage, double acting: There are two cylinders, which operate alternately, each pressurising gas while the other is refilling, but the second stage has a smaller bore and is filled by the gas pressurised by the first stage, and it pressurises the gas further. The stages operate in series, and the gas passes through both of them in turn.

== Power sources ==
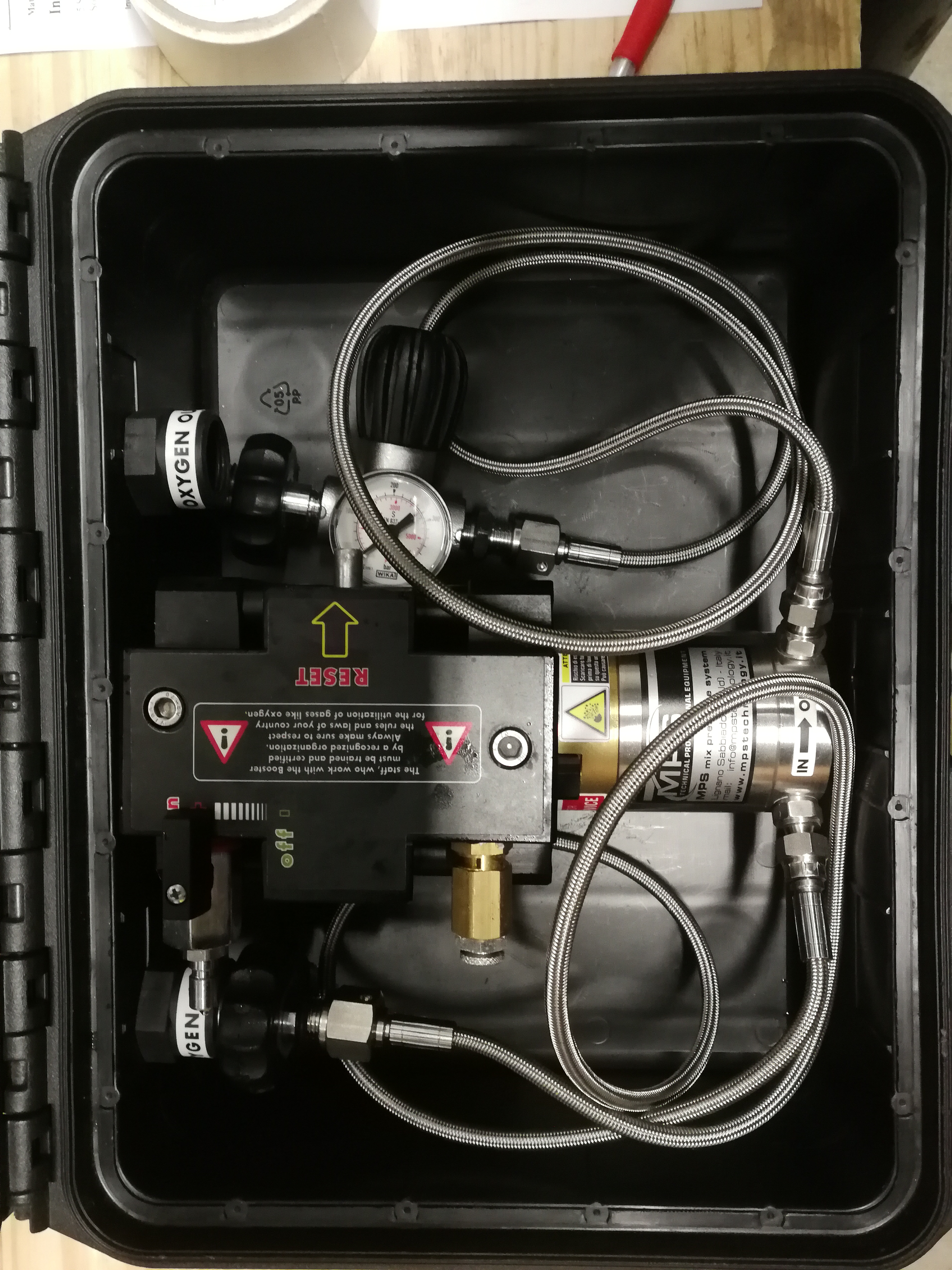
Small air powered portable high pressure breathing gas booster pump

Gas boosters may be driven by an electric motor, hydraulics, low or high pressure air, or manually by a lever system.

=== Compressed air ===
Those powered by compressed air are usually linear actuated systems, where a pneumatic cylinder directly drives the compression piston, often in a common housing, separated by one or more seals. A high pressure pneumatic drive arrangement may use the same pressure as the output pressure to drive the piston, and a low pressure drive will use a larger diameter piston to multiply the applied force.

==== Low pressure air ====
A common arrangement for low pressure air powered boosters is for the booster pistons to be direct coupled with the drive piston, on the same centreline. The low pressure cylinder has a considerably larger section area than the high pressure cylinders, in proportion to the pressure ratio between the drive and boosted gas. A single action booster of this type has a boost cylinder on one end of the power cylinder, and a double action booster has a boost cylinder on each end of the power cylinder, and the piston rod has a drive piston in the middle and a booster piston on each end.

Oxygen boosters require some design features which may not be necessary in boosters for less reactive gases. It is necessary to ensure that drive air, which may not be sufficiently clean for safe contact with high pressure oxygen, cannot leak past the seals into the booster cylinder, or high pressure oxygen can not leak ito the drive cylinder. This can be done by providing a space between the low pressure cylinder and high pressure cylinder that is vented to atmosphere, and the piston rod is sealed on each side where it passes through this space. Any gas leaks from either cylinder past the rod seals escapes harmlessly into the ambient air.

A special case for gas powered boosters is where the booster uses the same gas supply to power the booster and as the gas to be boosted. This arrangement is wasteful of gas and is most suitable for use to provide small quantities of higher pressure air where large quantities of lower pressure air are already available. This system is sometimes known as a "bootstrap" booster.

=== Electrical ===
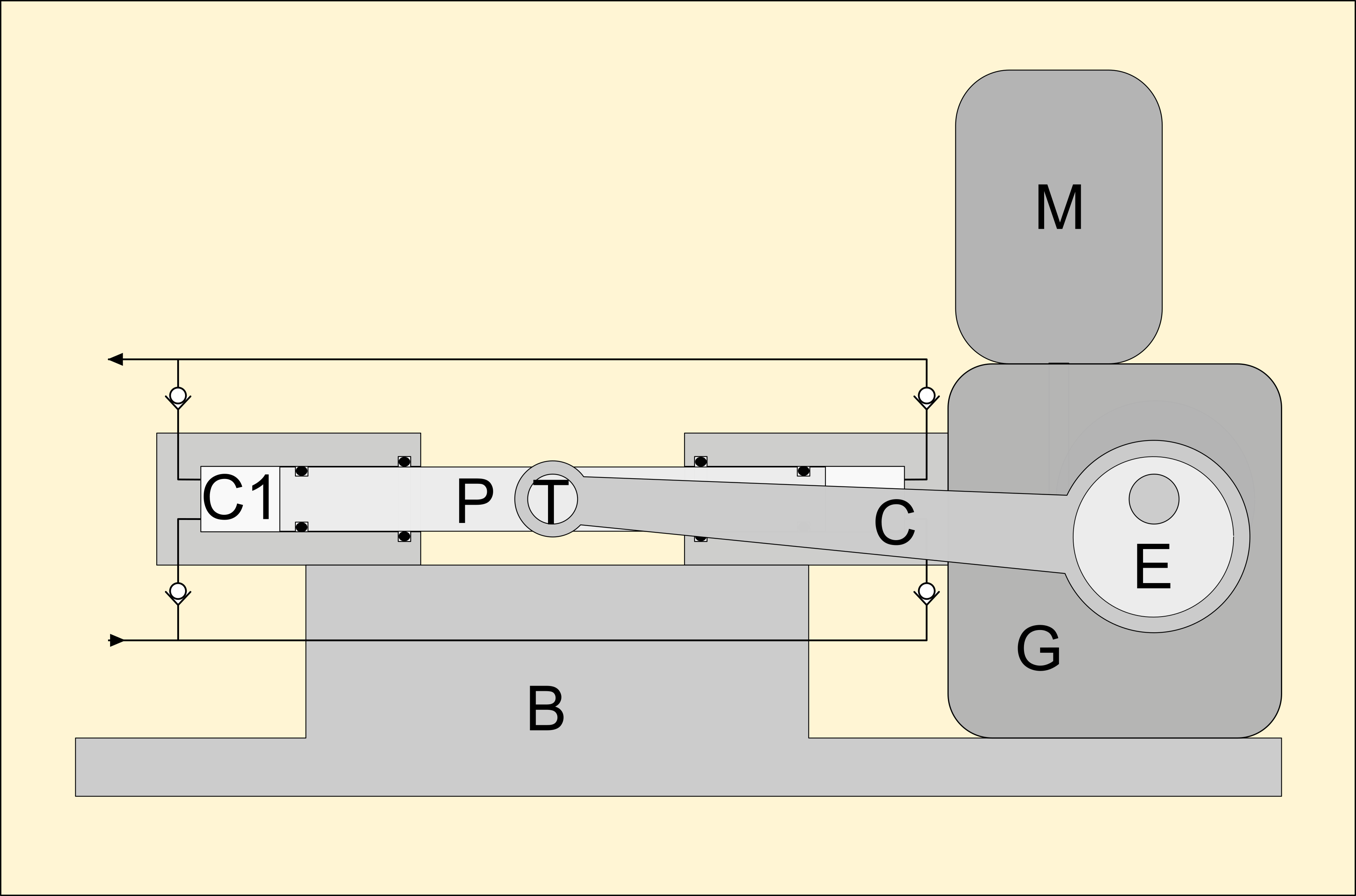
Schematic diagram of double action single stage gas booster with electric drive: C1: cylinder; P: piston; T: trunnion; B: base frame; C: connecting rod; G: gearbox; M: electric motor; E: eccentric drive

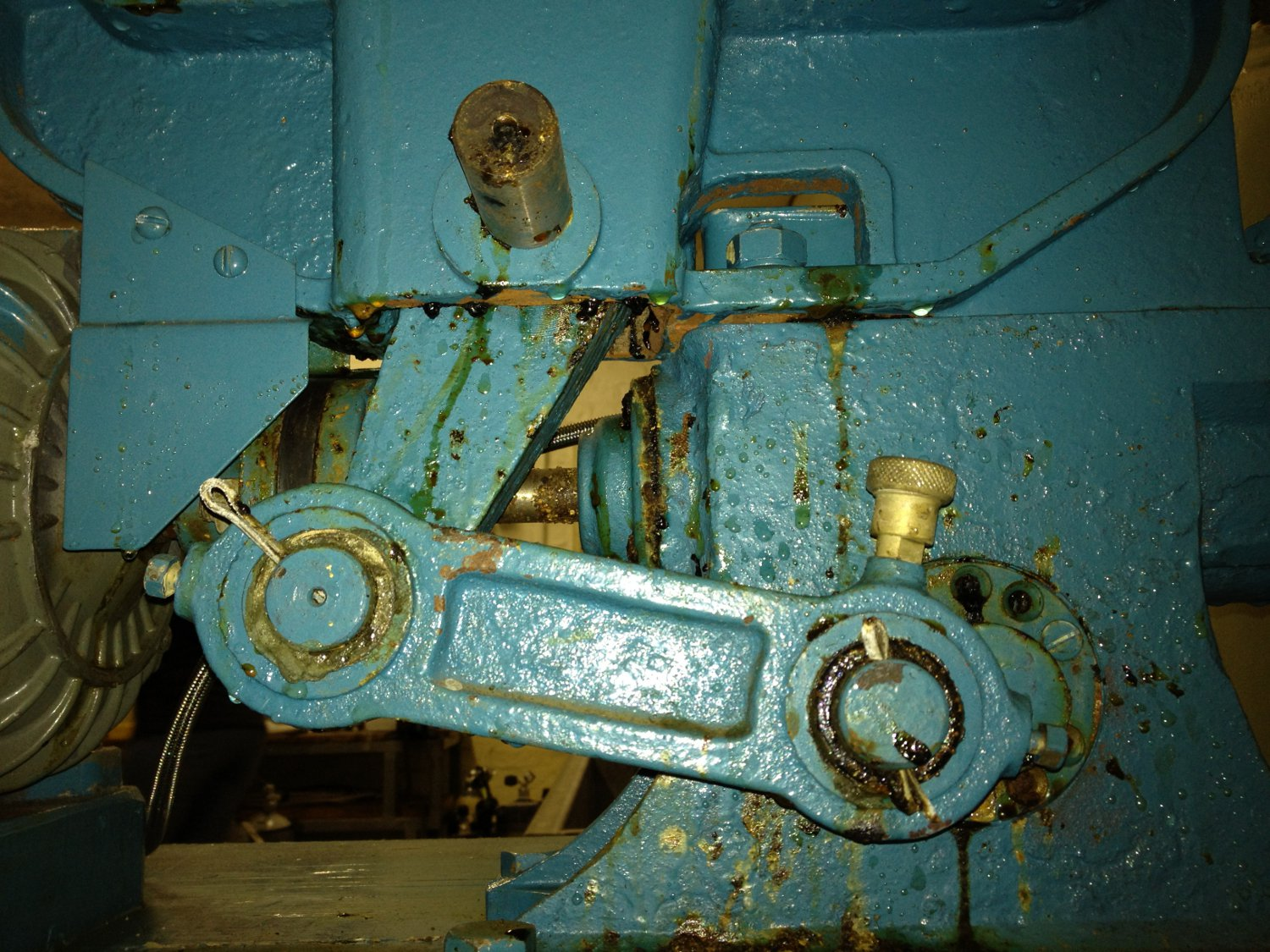
Back view of Russian oxygen booster pump

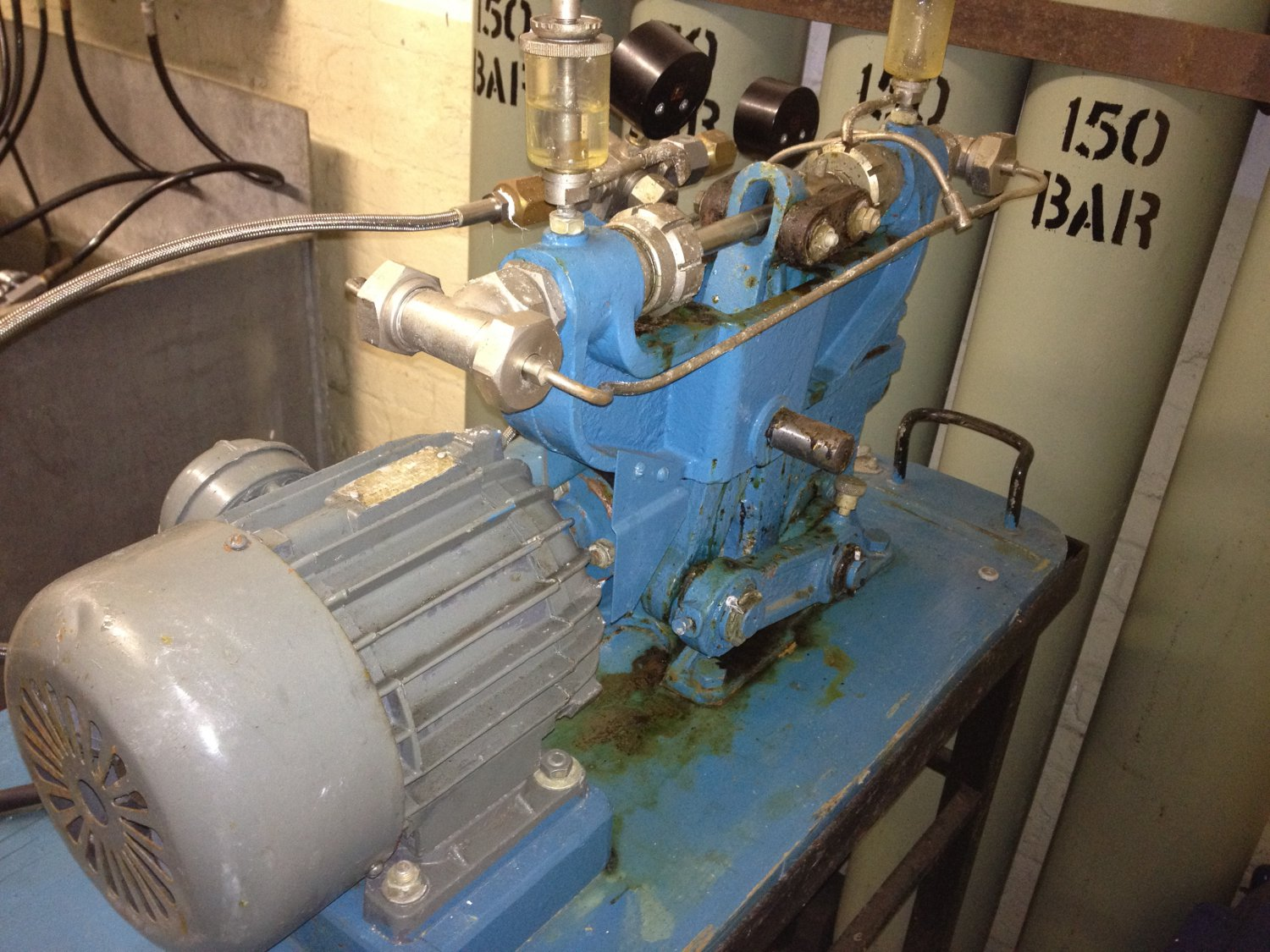
End view of Russian oxygen booster pump

Electrically powered boosters may use a single or three-phase AC motor drive. The high speed rotational output of the motor must be converted to lower speed reciprocating motion of the pistons. One way this has been done (Dräger and Russian KN-3 and KN-4 military boosters) is to connect the motor to a worm drive gearbox with an eccentric output shaft driving a connecting rod which drives the double-ended piston via a central trunnion. This system is well suited to a double acting booster, either with single-stage boost by parallel connected cylinders with the same bore, or two-stage cylinders of different bores connected in series. Some of these boosters allow for the connecting rod to be disconnected and a pair of long levers to be fitted for manual operation in emergencies or where electrical power is not available.

A booster can also resemble a single or multistage piston compressor driven by a crankshaft by a belt drive from an electric motor.

=== Manual ===
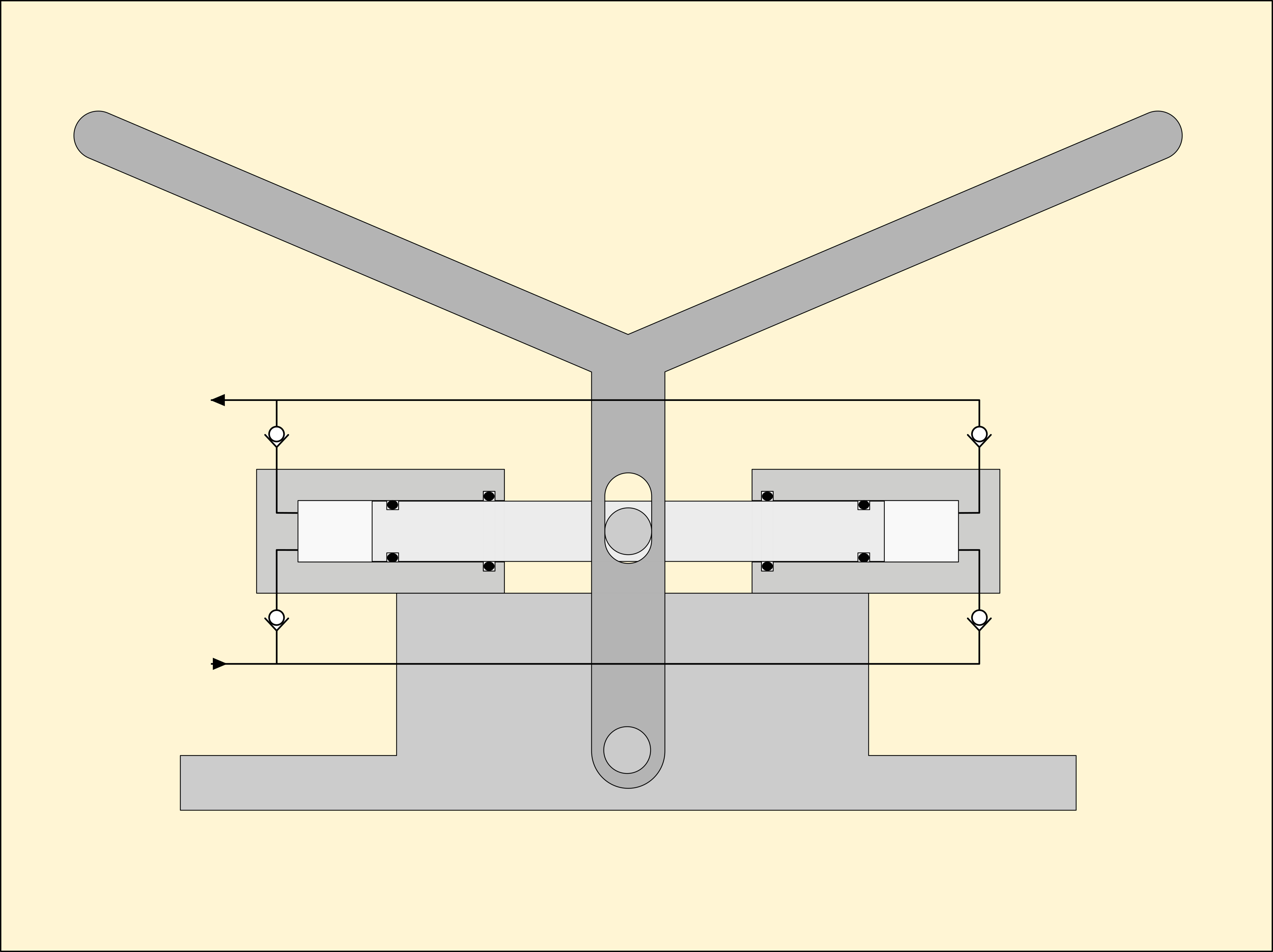
Schematic diagram of double action single stage gas booster with manual lever operation

Manual boosters have been made with the configuration described above, either with a single vertical lever or with a seesaw styled double ended horizontal lever, and also with two parallel vertically mounted cylinders, much like the lever-operated diver's air pumps used for the early standard diving dress but with much smaller bore to allow two operators to generate high pressures.

== Manufacturers ==
High pressure gas boosters are manufactured by Haskel, MPS Technology, Dräger, Gas Compression Systems, Atlas Copco, and others. Rugged and unsophisticated models (KN-3 and KN-4) were manufactured for the Soviet Armed Forces and surplus examples are now used by technical divers as they are relatively inexpensive and are supplied with a comprehensive spares and tool kit.
