= Dive log =

Record of diving history of an underwater diver

A CMAS dive log book.

A dive log is a record of the diving history of an underwater diver. The log may either be in a book, locally hosted software, or web based. The log serves purposes both related to safety and personal records. Information in a log may contain the date, time and location, the profile of the dive, equipment used, air usage, above and below water conditions, including temperature, current, wind and waves, general comments, and verification by the buddy, instructor or supervisor.

In case of a diving accident, it can provide valuable data regarding a diver's previous experience, as well as the other factors that might have led to the accident itself.

Recreational divers are generally advised to keep a logbook as a record, while professional divers may be legally obliged to maintain a logbook which is up to date and complete in its records. The professional diver's logbook is a legal document and may be important for getting employment. The required content and formatting of the professional diver's logbook is generally specified by the registration authority, but may also be specified by an industry association such as the International Marine Contractors Association (IMCA).

== Contents of the logbook ==
Typical fields in a recreational diver's log book would be the following:

- Header - Contains basic information about the date, time and location of the dive.
- Profile - Records sufficient detail to show the profile of the dive.
- Equipment - Shows what the diver was wearing and what dive gear was used during the dive.
- Conditions - Allows the diver to record what the environment was like (both above and below water).
- Comments - Used for any general information not covered in other sections.
- Verification - used to record the signature and certification details of the buddy / instructor that was with the diver during the dive.

A more minimalistic log book for recreational divers who are only interested in keeping a record of their accumulated experience (total number of dives and total amount of time underwater), could just contain the first point of the above list and the maximum depth of the dive.

A commercial diver's logbook may be considered a legal document, and may contain more information, both about the diver, and about each dive recorded. It is generally verified by the diving supervisor for each diving operation. It may include the following sections:

1. Personal details of the diver
2. Medical certificates of fitness to dive and notes
3. Qualifications and certificates
4. Training record
5. Competence assessment record
6. Record of dives
7. Medical records illness or injury
8. Cumulative diving experience

The record of each dive may contain:

1. Date of the dive
2. Signature of the diver
3. Name and address of the diving contractor
4. Dive location
5. Vessel or installation from which the dive is done
6. Type of dive (Surface oriented or saturation)
  - For bell bounce or surface dives:
    - Maximum depth of the dive
    - Time left surface or started pressurisation
    - Bottom time
    - Time that decompression was completed
    - Details of any surface decompression, including surface interval and time in the chamber
    - Accumulated bottom time
    - Accumulated total time under pressure
  - For saturation dives:
    - Storage depth
    - Maximum depth of dive
    - Bell lock-off time
    - Time that diver left bell
    - Time that diver returned to bell
    - Lock-out duration
    - Bell lock-on time
    - Accumulated number of lock-outs
    - Accumulated total time under pressure
7. Details of work done and equipment used:
  - Breathing apparatus used
  - Breathing mixture used
  - Work description, equipment and tools used
8. Name of decompression schedules used
9. Notes regarding any decompression incident or other illness or injury
10. Any other relevant comments
11. Name and signature of the diving supervisor for the dive
12. Diving contractor's official company stamp

== Dive log software ==
Usually dive computer manufactures have their own software to view and analyze logged dive profiles, but there are also open source versions. Subsurface is free open source dive log software started by Linus Torvalds, which is compatible with several makes of downloadable diving computer.
