= Dive guide =

Dive guide may refer to:

- Dive leader or Divemaster, A recreational dive leader certification and role.
- Dive guide (publication), a Travel guide publication for a dive site or region.
