= Engineer diver =

Engineer diver may refer to:

- A proposed postgraduate engineering qualification in underwater inspection of engineering structures.
- Army engineer diver, a diver in the United States Army Engineering Corps.
