= Diver training organization =

Organization which provides training in diving skills or knowledge

A diver training organization is an organization which trains people in the skills of diving. It may refer to a diving school for training recreational, technical, commercial, military and other professional underwater divers. Since the term diving applies to both underwater activities and the sport of acrobatic jumping or falling into the water, it may also refer to organizations which train people in those skills.

The term may also be loosely used to refer to diver certification organizations and agencies. These organizations do not generally train divers directly, though they set the standards, and may train and assess diving instructors, and affiliate diving schools.

Diver registration authorities generally do not train divers, but register commercial divers trained and assessed against their standards by commercial diving schools.

Military divers are generally trained, assessed, certified and registered by the a training unit of the armed force of which they are members. In some cases the certification may be recognised by a civilian diver registration authority as equivalent to a specific commercial diving certification, allowing the person to register as a commercial diver after leaving the armed forces.

== See also ==
- List of diver certification organizations
