= Deep water blackout =

Deep water blackout may refer to:

- ascent blackout, a freediving blackout, on ascending from a deep freedive or breath-hold dive
- a blackout in deep diving
