= Dynamic compression of the airways =

Mechanism reducing lung airway section area during forced expiration

Dynamic compression of the airways results when intrapleural pressure equals or exceeds alveolar pressure, which causes dynamic collapsing of the lung airways. It is termed dynamic given the transpulmonary pressure (alveolar pressure − intrapleural pressure) varies based on factors including lung volume, compliance, resistance, existing pathologies, etc.

It occurs during forced expiration when intrapleural pressure is greater than atmospheric pressure (positive barometric values), and not during passive expiration when intrapleural pressure remains at subatmospheric pressures (negative barometric values). Clinically, dynamic compression is most commonly associated with the wheezing sound during forced expiration, such as in individuals with chronic obstructive pulmonary disorder (COPD).
