= List of legislation regulating underwater diving =

This list identifies the legislation governing underwater diving activities listed by region. Some legislation affects only professional diving, other may affect only recreational diving, or all diving activities. The list includes primary and delegated legislation, and international standards for the conduct of diving adopted by national states, but does not include legislation or standards relating to manufacture or testing of diving equipment.

== Argentina ==
Ordinance No. 4-08 (dpsn) Volume 5 Regime of Merchant Marine Personnel, July 1, 2008.
The regulation of professional diving
Ordinance No. 1-01 (dpsn) Volume 4 - Regime of nautical sports activities 2001.
The regulation of recreational diving

== Australia ==
=== Queensland ===
Safety in Recreational Water Activities Act 2011.
Safety in Recreational Water Activities Regulation 2011.
Recreational Diving, Recreational Technical Diving and Snorkelling Code of Practice 2018
A Queensland code of practice under section 43 of the Safety in Recreational Water Activities Act 2011

== Austria ==
Verordrung 501: Druckluft- und Taucherarbeiten- Verordnung
Inshore diving

== Canada ==
=== Quebec ===
S-3.1 Act respecting safety in sports, Chapter V.2 Recreative underwater diving 1997, c. 37, s. 2.
The chapter applies to underwater diving using compressed breathing gas that is not done as part of an occupational activity, and to teaching such diving.

== Denmark and Greenland ==
Consolidated decree on the entry into force for Greenland of the act on diving operations and diving equipment, etc.
Diving Act, Act No.307, dated 17 May 1995
The act regulates underwater work requiring breathing apparatus which would normally be done for payment, including rescue operations, and specifically excludes tasks related to recreational diving.

== Germany ==
Festlandsockelbergvorordnung
Regulates offshore diving
Unfallsverhütungsvorschrift "Taucharbeiten" VBG 39
Regulates inshore and inland diving
Unfallsverhütungsvorschrift "Arbeitsmedizinische Versorge" VBG 100
Requirement for medical certificates

== Israel ==
Recreational diving Act, 1979
Recreational diving. It is not permitted to dive beyond the level of certification held unless in training with an instructor, and the diver must have appropriate insurance covering diving accidents. Solo diving is prohibited.

== Italy ==
=== Sicily ===
Sicilian law on commercial diving training, 2016
Regulates training paths for inshore and offshore commercial diving activities, according International Diving Schools Association guidelines and an online database of certified commercial divers.

== Maldives ==
Maldives Recreational Diving Regulation, 2003
Recreational diving service providers are required to be licensed. No recreational diving is allowed deeper than 30m or requiring decompression stops. Divers must show evidence of certification and recent experience. Solo diving is forbidden.

== Malta ==
Recreational Diving Services Regulation, 2012
Only diving centres licensed by the Malta Tourism Authority, and meeting their minimum standards for facilities, equipment and service, are allowed to provide diving services to the public.

== The Netherlands ==
Anschrijving Duikherkammeren
Regulates offshore diving
Labour and Work Act
Regulates inshore and inland diving

== Norway ==
Regulation relating to manned underwater operations in the petroleum activities with guidelines
Regulates offshore diving
Dykking Best nr.511 (Diving No. 511)
Regulates inshore diving

== South Africa ==
Diving Regulations, 2001
Occupational health and safety regulating occupational diving operations and training, but explicitly exclude recreational diver training and dive shop operations, which are generally covered by the Occupational Health and Safety Act 85 of 1993. Superseded by Diving Regulations 2009.
Diving Regulations, 2009
DR2009 regulates all commercial diving operations and training, including military and other professional diving, inshore, inland and offshore, but explicitly exclude recreational diver training and dive shop operations, which are generally covered by the Occupational Health and Safety Act 85 of 1993. Superseded by Diving Regulations 2017
Diving Regulations, 2017
DR2017 regulates all commercial diving operations and training, including military and other professional diving, inshore, inland and offshore, but explicitly exclude recreational diver training and dive shop operations, which are generally covered by the Occupational Health and Safety Act 85 of 1993.
Code of Practice for Inshore Diving
The Code of Practice for Inshore Diving provides guidance for accepted safe working practices using surface supplied diving equipment for commercial diving operations within the territorial waters of South Africa. It is incorporated into the Diving Regulations as of 2017
Code of Practice for Scientific Diving
The Code of Practice for Inshore Diving provides guidance for accepted safe working practices using scuba or surface supplied diving equipment for scientific diving operations within the territorial waters of South Africa.
Code of Practice for Commercial Diver Training
The Code of Practice for Commercial Diver Training provides guidance and required minimum standards for accepted safe training practices using scuba or surface supplied diving equipment for diving operations in which learner divers are involved within the territorial waters of South Africa.
SANOP 96
Diving operations carried out by the South African Navy in compliance wit South African Naval Operational Publication number 96 are deemed to be in compliance with the diving regulations

== Spain ==
The government of Spain issued a royal decree taking effect on 1 July 2020 (Real Decreto 550/2020 de 2 de junio: Condiciones de Seguridad de las actividades de buceo), regulating recreational diving activities Restrictions include:

- a diver must have the appropriate and necessary training for the type of diving intended,
- diving service providers and clubs have an obligation to ensure that equipment to be used for diving operations complies with the current regulations and the manufacturer's recommendations,
- the minimum age for diving is 18 years, but for recreational diving 8 years, subject to depth limits by age for divers younger than 18 years,
- some items of equipment are compulsory, such as:
  - diving equipment including mask, snorkel, fins, buoyancy compensation device, regulator with two second stages, and submersible pressure gauge,
  - safety equipment including a dive computer or timer and dive tables, a cutting device, a surface marker buoy, and a sound signal for the surface,
- fitness to dive according to the RSTC questionnaire.
- with the exception of the support vessel, all vessels must remain at least 50 metres from the diving area,
- recreational diving is limited to 40 meters depth on air and nitrox, with direct access to the surface, with a buddy,
  - scheduled decompression diving is not permitted,
  - penetration diving in caves and wrecks beyond natural light and beyond a penetration of 30 metres is not permitted,
  - recreational divers must have accident and civil liability insurance covering diving activities.

== Sweden ==
Dykeriarbete (English: Diving Works)
Regulates inshore and inland diving, no offshore regulations

== Switzerland ==
Hyperbaric Worker Safety Ordinance, 15 April 2015
Regulates inshore/inland diving, no offshore regulations

== United Kingdom ==
Diving at Work Regulations 1997
The DAWRs regulate all aspects of professional diving (diving at work), including recreational diver instruction and divemasters.
Marine and Coastal Access Act 2009
The MCAA specifies when a licence is required for an activity that involve depositing or removing a substance or object in the UK Marine Area below the mean high water springs mark.

== United States ==
Regulations (Standards - 29 CFR), Part Number: 1910, Occupational Safety and Health Standards, Subpart: T - Commercial Diving Operations. Standard Number: 1910.424 - SCUBA diving.

=== Exemptions ===
- Scientific diving
- Search and rescue and emergency public safety operations in public safety diving (some states, only when there is a reasonable expectation of rescuing a survivor or when the probable consequences of delay exceed the probable consequences of diving)
- Covert operations by military divers.
