= Diver's pump =

Manually powered surface air supply for divers

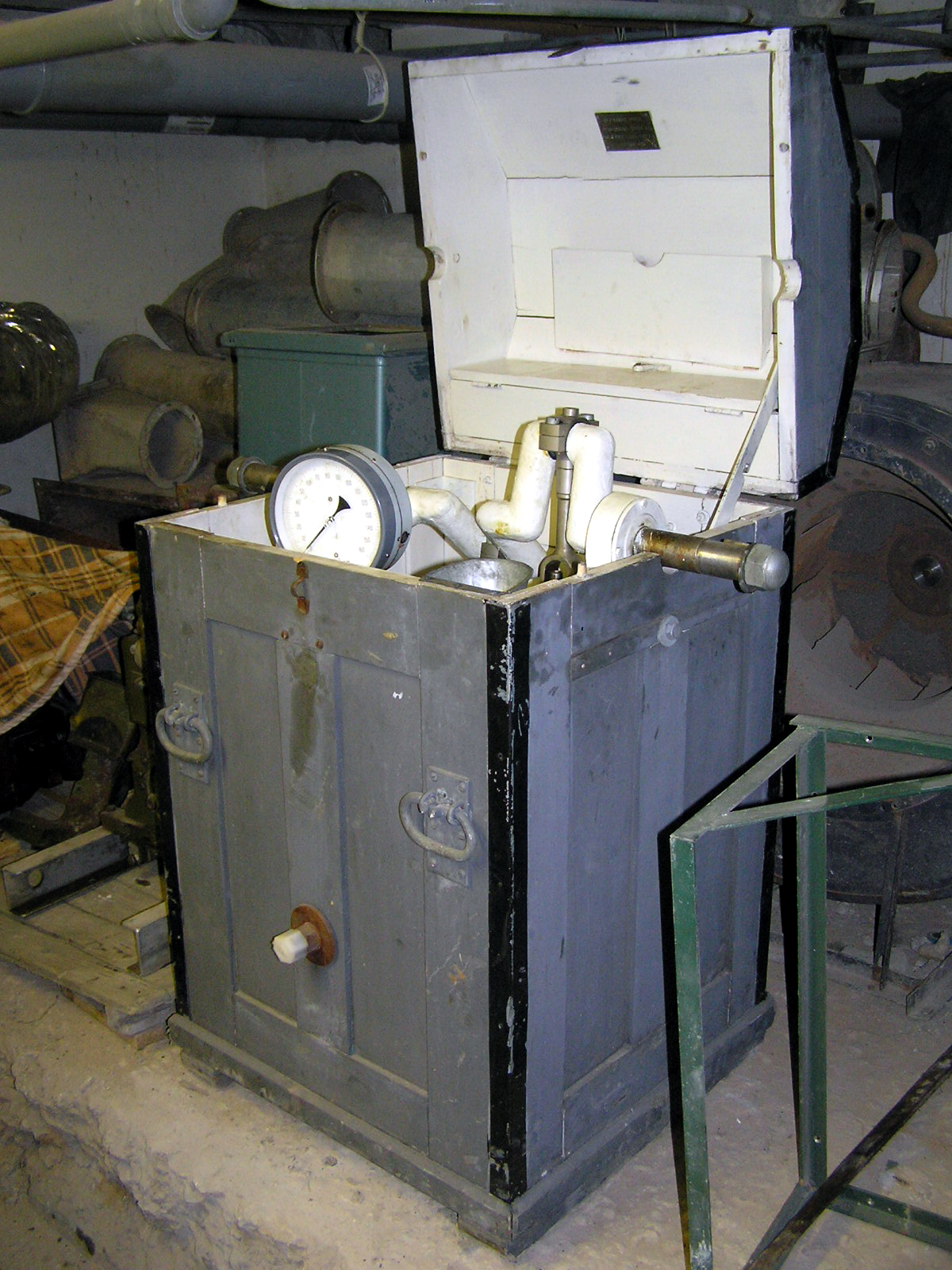
- Three cylinder rotary diver's pump "П3" (flywheels removed), manufactured in USSR in 1977.
- Other names: Diving air pump
- Uses: Supply of breathing air to a copper helmet diver

A diver's pump is a manually operated low pressure air compressor used to provide divers in standard diving dress with air while they are underwater.

== Rotary ==
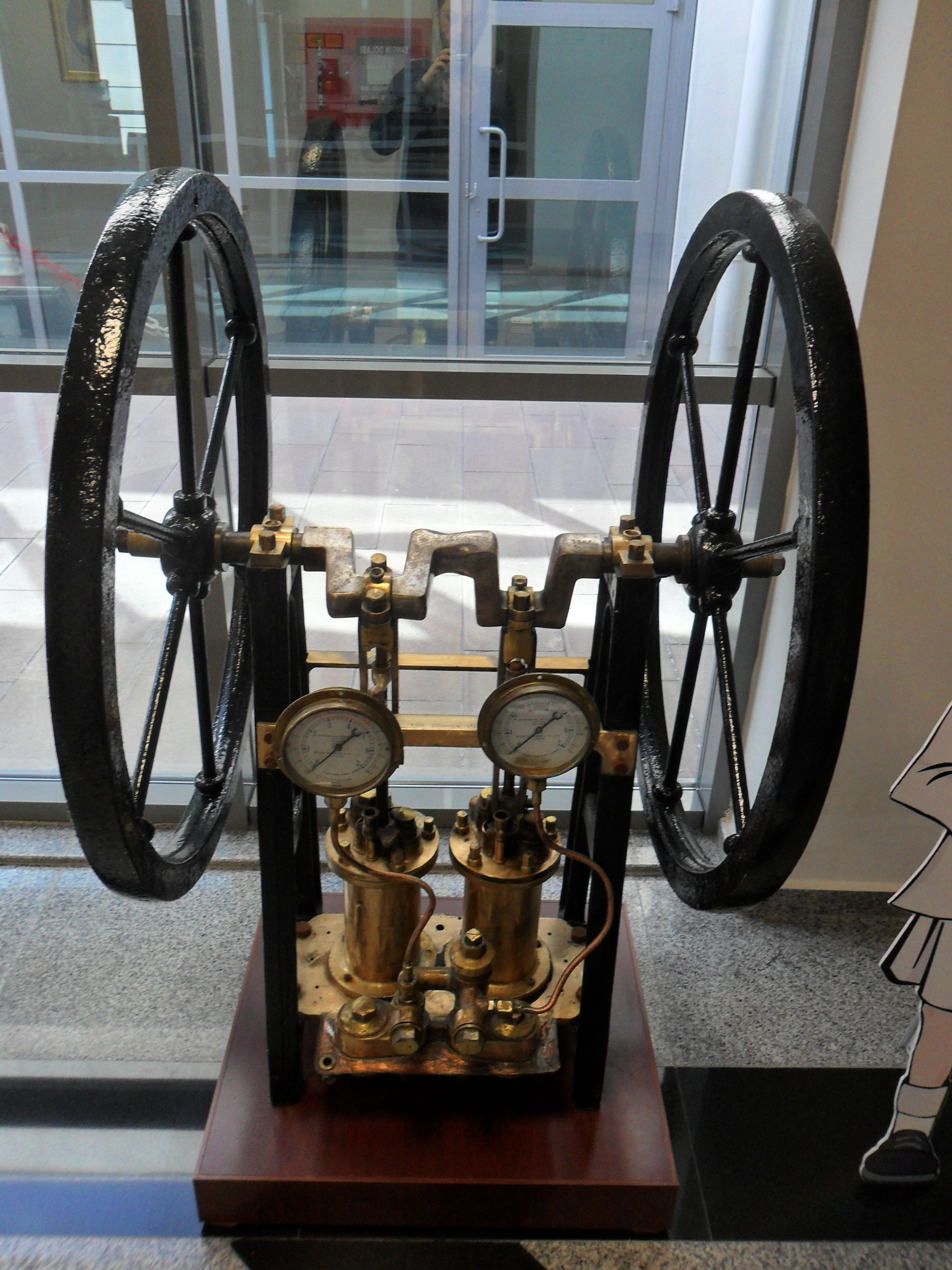
Manually operated two-cylinder diver's air pump without cabinet, showing the functional components

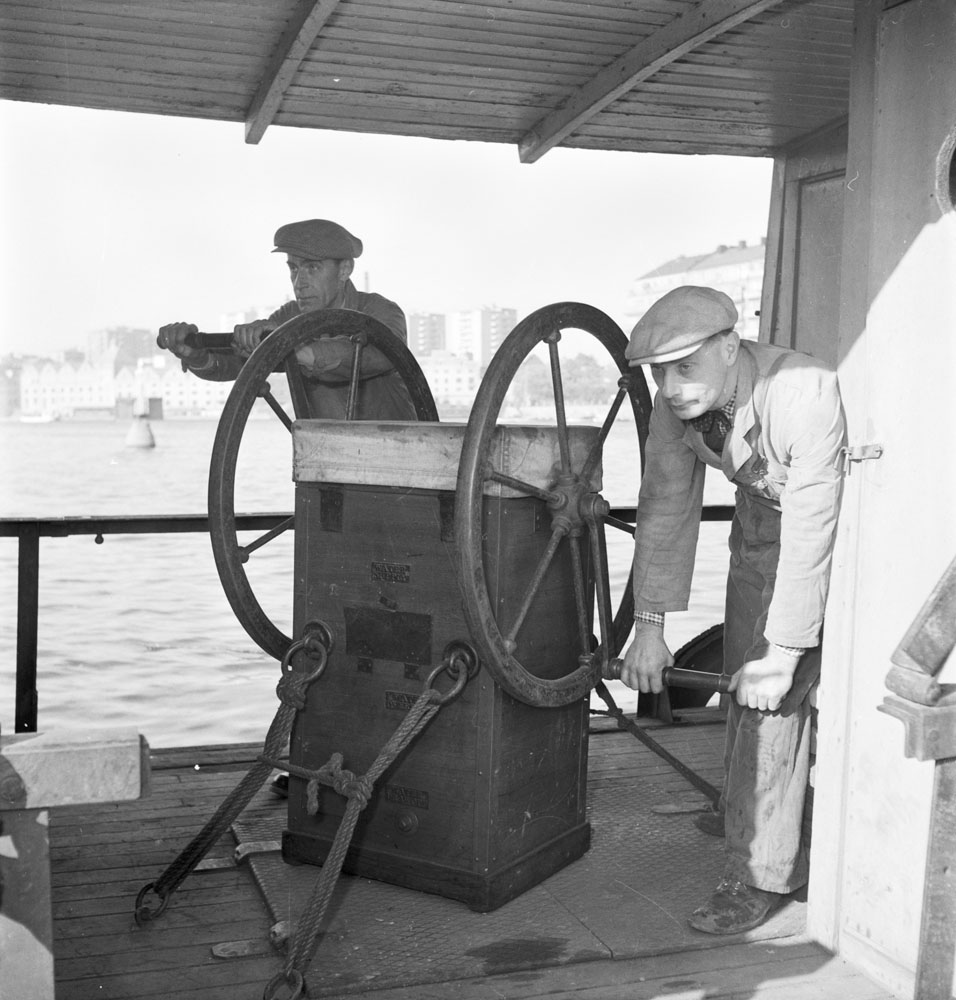
Two men operating a rotary diver's air pump

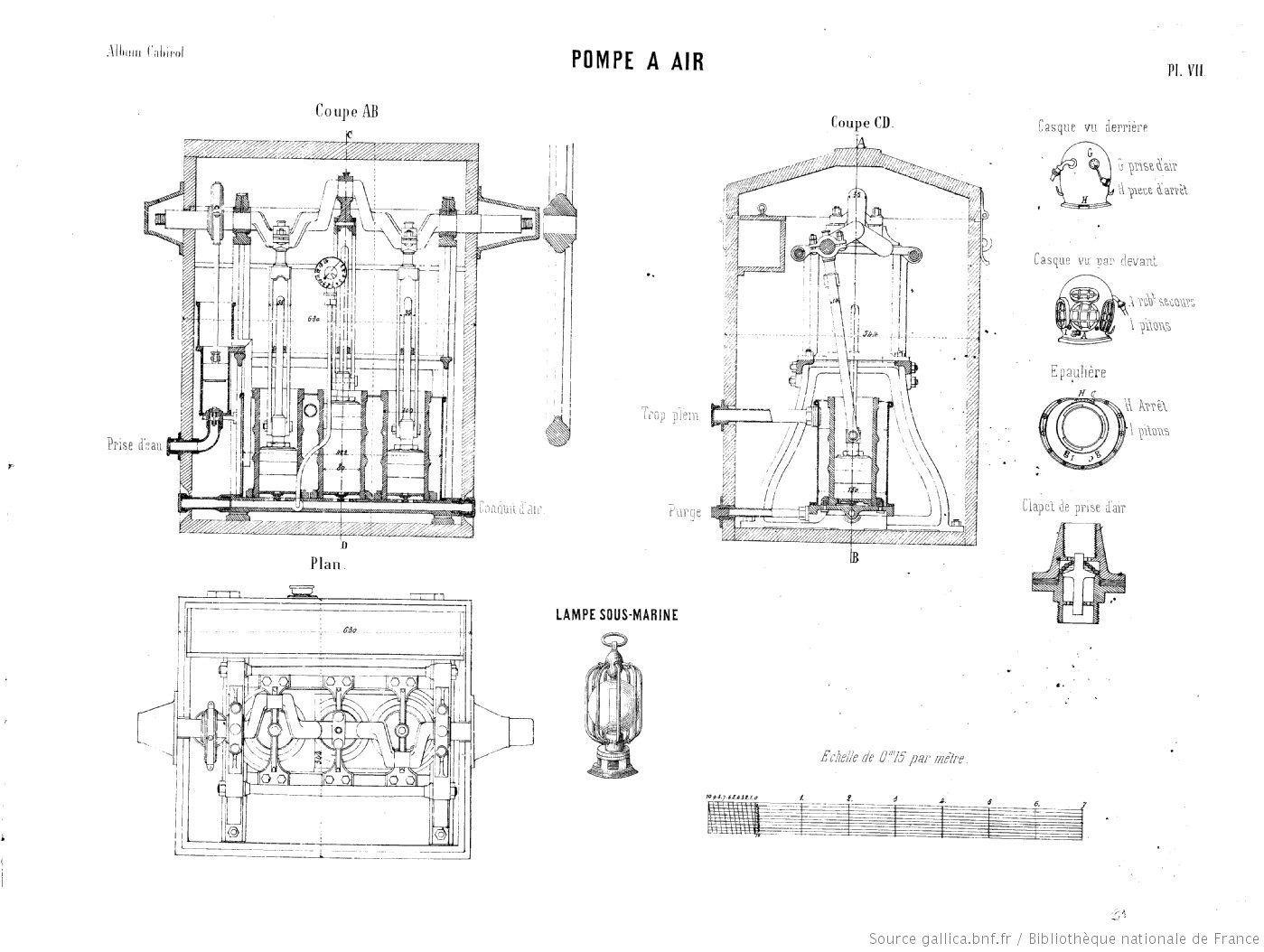
Arrangement drawing of a single-action 3-cylinder rotary air pump

Rotary pumps are driven by a crankshaft that is rotated by handles on two flywheels attached to the ends of the shaft on each side of the pump. Rotary pumps were built with one, two or three cylinders, and are operated by a team of two men. Pistons attached to the crankshaft draw in air through the inlet valves and then pump it through the outlet valves to an air hose which delivers the air to the helmet of the diver. Cylinders, valves and outlet fittings for air are generally made from brass for corrosion resistance in the marine environment. Rotary operated pumps were manufactured with single or double action.

Flow of air through the helmet could be controlled by manually adjusting the back-pressure on the helmet exhaust valve, usually on the lower right side of the bonnet, and by manually adjusting the inlet supply valve on the airline, usually fastened to the front lower left of the corselet. Flow rate would also be affected by the surface delivery system and depth. Manual pumps would be operated at the speed necessary for sufficient air supply, which could be judged by delivery pressure and feedback from the diver. Many manual pumps had delivery pressure gauges calibrated in units of water depth - feet or metres of water column - which would provide the supervisor with a reasonable indication of diver depth. If the diver needed more air, the operators would have to crank faster.

== Lever ==
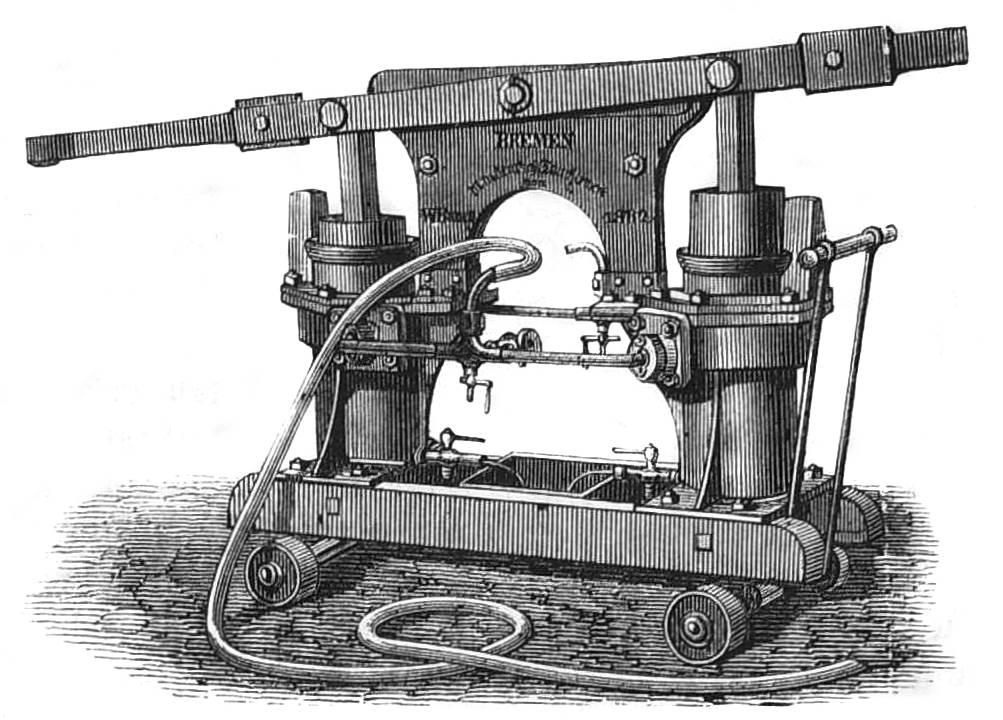
Two-cylinder lever pump

Lever pumps have one or two cylinders, which are operated by rocking a beam with handles attached to its ends which is pivoted at the centre for a two-cylinder pump, and at the end for a single cylinder pump. Vertical lever pumps with bell-crank operation were also made, usually for shallow water work. The piston rods are connected to the beam near the pivot. Upward movement of the pistons pulls the air into the cylinders through the inlet valves, and then downward movement pumps the air through the hose to the helmet of the diver in a single action pump. Cylinders, valves and outlet for air are usually made from brass for reliability.

== Other components ==
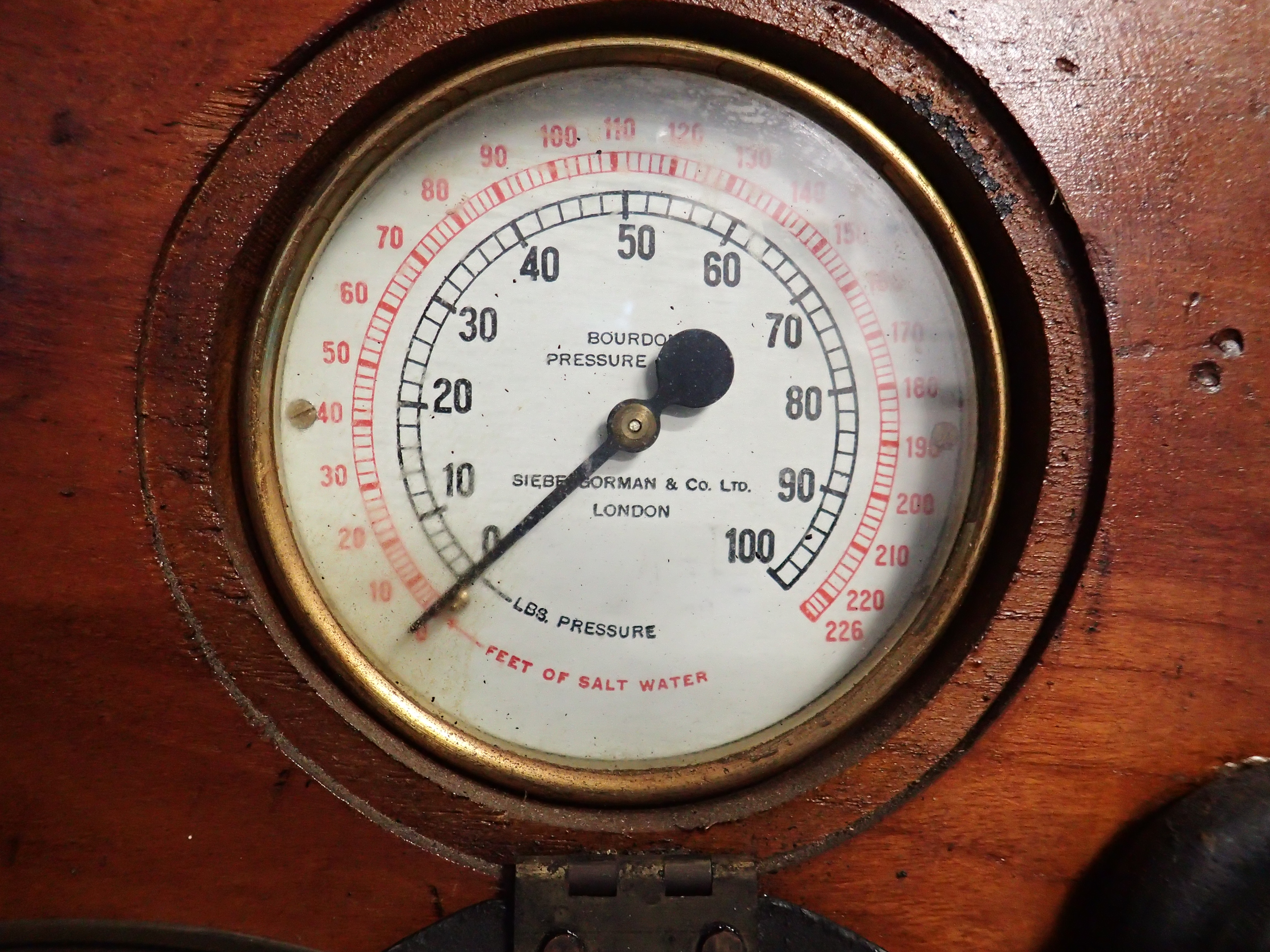
Pressure gauge on Siebe Gorman manual diver's pump, indicating delivered pressure in pounds per square inch (black) and feet sea water (red)

The pump may be mounted in a cabinet for protection during transport and storage, and may be fitted with one or more pressure gauges.

== Gallery ==
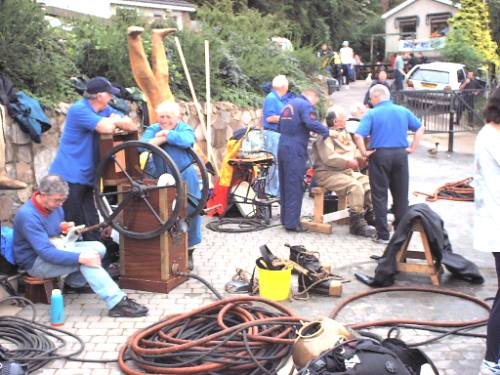
Historical Diving Society diving at Stoney Cove, England using two cylinder rotary pump

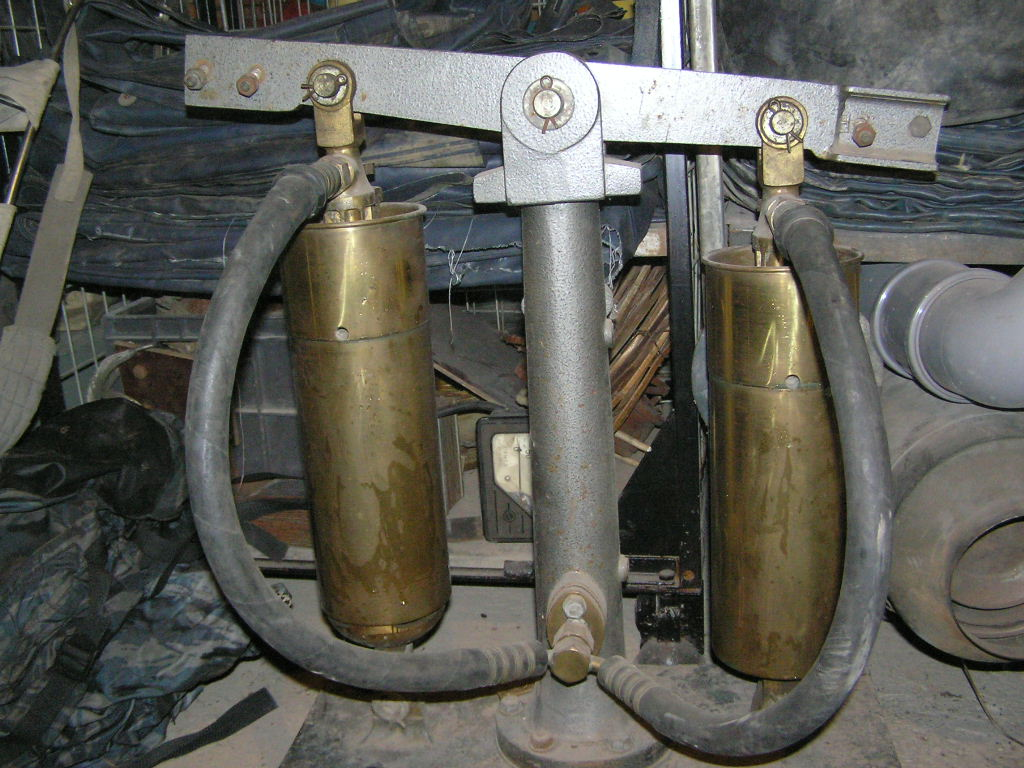
Two cylinder lever diver's pump made by "Drägerwerk AG" (Germany)

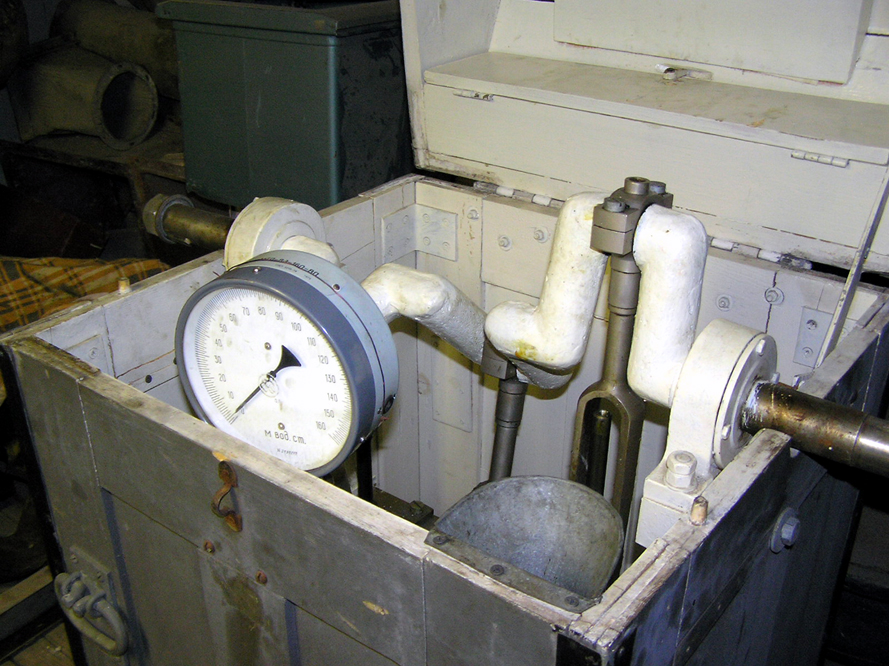
The crankshaft of three cylinder diving pump

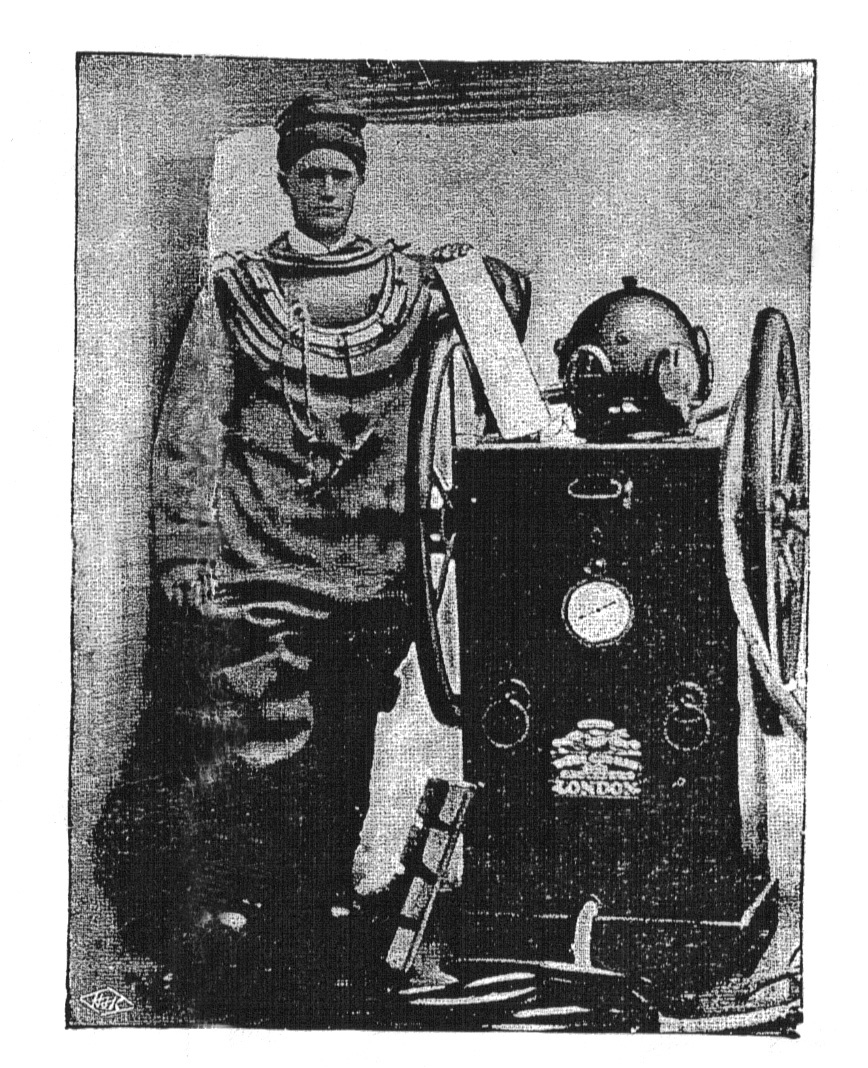
Diver in Standard diving dress posing with diver's pump. His helmet is on top of the pump.

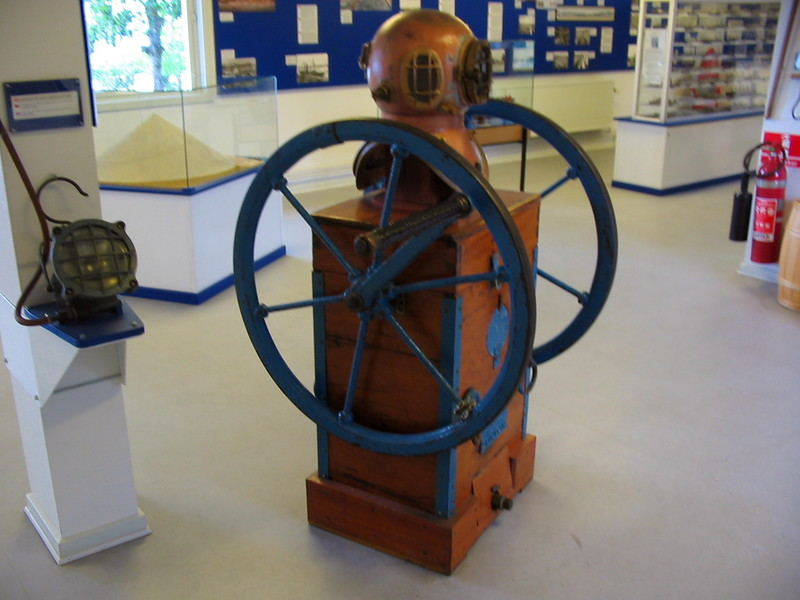
Rotary diver's pump

== See also ==
- Diving air compressor – Machine used to compress breathing air for use by underwater divers
- Diving equipment – Equipment used to facilitate underwater diving
- Gas booster – Machine to increase the pressure of compressed gas
- History of underwater diving – Developments over time in the human activity
- Pneumofathometer – Instrument for measuring the depth of a diver by air pressure
- Standard diving dress – Copper helmet with rubberised canvas diving suit and weighted boots
