= Diversnight =

Annual night diving festival

Diversnight is a gathering of Scuba divers and those interested in diving, and is made possible thanks to voluntary work and helpful sponsors. As the name implies, this event occurs after dark. The festival attempts to get as many divers as possible in the water at the same time, all over the world. The record from 2009 is 2749 divers on 218 dive sites in 20 countries.

Diversnight is well known for the cakes (especially a Norwegian Diversnight tradition) and prizes.

== History ==
This tradition started in Norway in 2005, as an attempt to set a world record for number of scuba divers Night diving at the same time.

Divers collect samples of aquatic plants or animals to show spectators what scuba diving has to offer. Many divers take underwater photos or videos. Volunteers on the shore offer warm drinks and food to spectators, and to the divers when the dives are complete.

As of October 21, 2012, 159 dive sites in 25 countries had registered.

== 2012 ==
Diversnight 2012 was November 1, at 20:12. This is one month earlier than previous years, in order to avoid weather-related problems, especially in the northern countries. In 2010 many dive sites were covered with ice and the temperature reached −20 °C (−4 °F).
